= Arthur, 4th Count of Schönborn-Wiesentheid =

Arthur von Schönborn-Wiesentheid
- Count of Schönborn-Wiesentheid
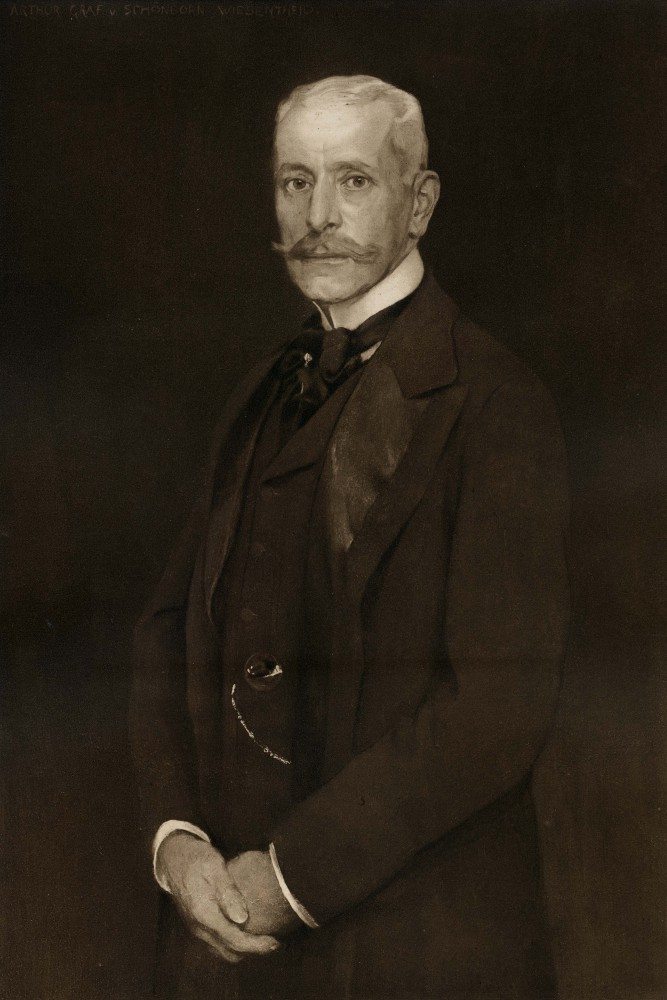
- Portrait of Count von Schönborn-Wiesentheid, by Philip de László, 1899
- Born: Artur Franz Maximilian von Schönborn-Wiesentheid; 30 January 1846; Würzburg
- Died: 29 September 1915 (aged 69); Wiesentheid, Lower Franconia, Bavaria
- Spouse: Princess Stephanie of Hohenlohe-Schillingsfürst
- Issue: Maria von Schönborn-Wiesentheid; Johanna von Schönborn-Wiesentheid; Erwein von Schönborn-Wiesentheid
- House: Schönborn-Wiesentheid
- Father: Klemens von Schönborn-Wiesentheid
- Mother: Irene Batthyány de Német-Ujvár

Arthur Franz Maximilian, 4th Count of Schönborn-Wiesentheid (30 January 1846 – 29 September 1915) was an Austrian nobleman.

== Early life ==
Schönborn-Wiesentheid was born on 30 January 1846 in into the Hochadel (high nobility). He was the son of Klemens, 3rd Count of Schönborn-Wiesentheid and Irene, Countess Batthyány de Német-Ujvár. Among his siblings were Elma von Schönborn-Wiesentheid (wife of diplomat Karl von und zu Franckenstein).

His paternal grandfather, Franz, 1st Count of Schönborn-Wiesentheid, was succeeded as Count by Arthur's uncle, Hugo, 2nd Count of Schönborn-Wiesentheid in 1840. Upon his death in 1865, the title passed to Arthur's father, Klemens.

== Career ==
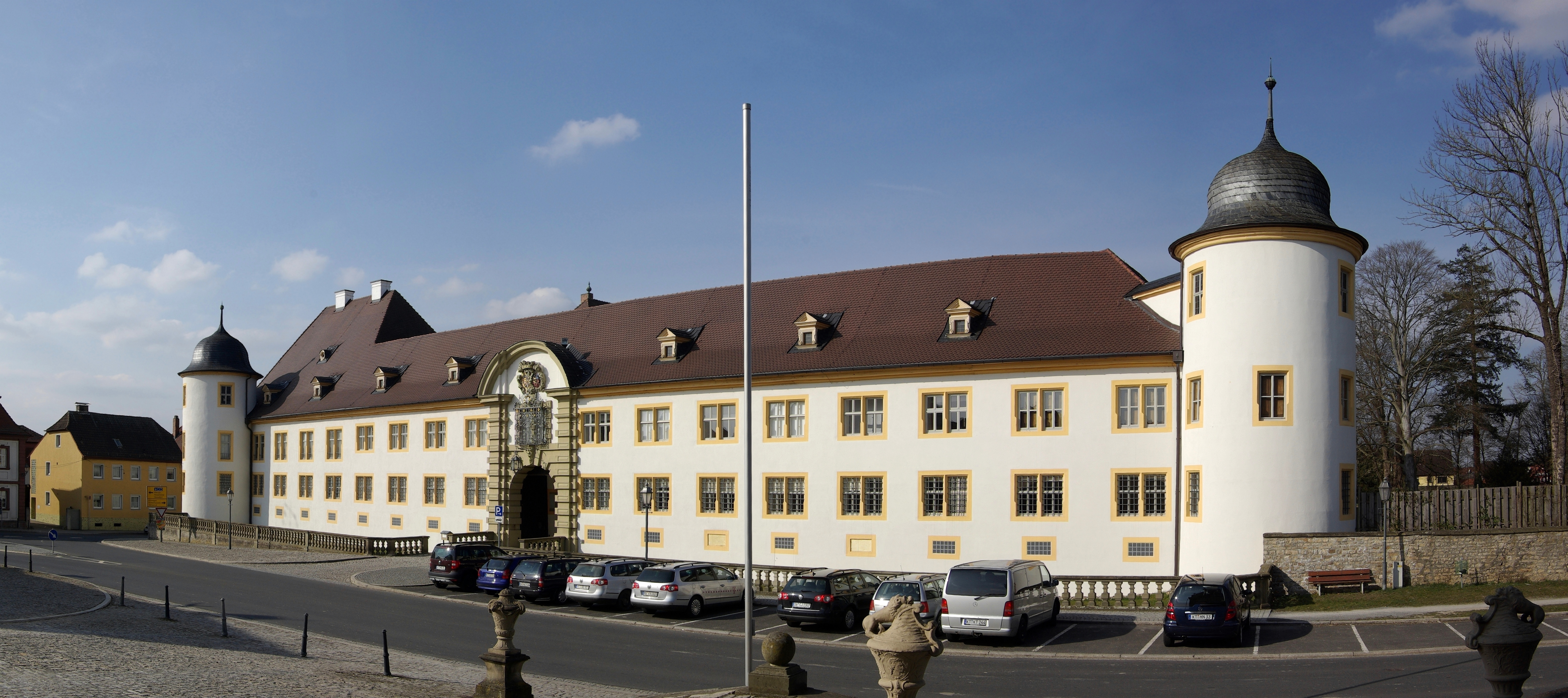
Wiesentheid Castle, built for Rudolf Franz Erwein von Schönborn in 1701

The County of Schönborn-Wiesentheid was in Lower Franconia, the northwestern Region of modern Bavaria, and comprised various isolated districts spanning from the Regnitz River to the Main River east of Würzburg. Schönborn-Wiesentheid, a partition of Schönborn, inherited the other line of Schönborn-Heusenstamm in 1801 before it was mediatised to Bavaria in 1806.

Upon the death of his father in 1877, he became the titular Count of Schönborn-Wiesentheid.

== Personal life ==
He married Princess Stephanie Marie Antonie of Hohenlohe-Schillingsfürst (1851–1882), the second daughter of Princess Marie von Sayn-Wittgenstein-Sayn and Chlodwig, Prince of Hohenlohe-Schillingsfürst, the longtime Minister President of Prussia who served as Chancellor of the German Empire from 1894 to 1900 under Emperor Wilhelm II. Together, they were the parents of:

- Maria von Schönborn-Wiesentheid (1872–1920), who married Wolfgang, Count von Oberndorff, brother of Alfred von Oberndorff. After his death in 1906, she married Stanislaus, 5th Prince of Sayn-Wittgenstein-Sayn (grandson of Prince Ludwig zu Sayn-Wittgenstein-Berleburg). After her death in 1920, her widow married Donna Elena Ruffo (the sister of Erwein's wife Donna Ernestina).
- Johanna von Schönborn-Wiesentheid (1875–1957), who married Erwein, Count und Edler Herr von und zu Eltz gen. Faust von Stromberg.
- Erwein von Schönborn-Wiesentheid (1877–1942), who married Donna Ernestina Ruffo, a daughter of Antonio Ruffo, 10th Prince of Scaletta, and Ludovica Borghese.

Princess Stephanie died in Munich on 18 March 1882. The Count of Schönborn-Wiesentheid died on 29 September 1915 in Wiesentheid. His portrait was painted by Philip de László.
