= Klemens, 3rd Count of Schönborn-Wiesentheid =

Klemensvon Schönborn-Wiesentheid
- Count of Schönborn-Wiesentheid
- Born: Klemens August Emmerich von Schönborn-Wiesentheid; 8 October 1810; Gaibach
- Died: 24 August 1887 (aged 76)
- Spouse: Irene Batthyány de Német-Ujvár
- Issue: Marie Athenaïs von Schönborn-Wiesentheid; Elma von Schönborn-Wiesentheid; Arthur von Schönborn-Wiesentheid; Friedrich Karl von Schönborn-Wiesentheid; Clemens Philipp von Schönborn-Wiesentheid
- House: Schönborn-Wiesentheid
- Father: Franz Erwein von Schönborn-Wiesentheid
- Mother: Fernandine von Westphalen zu Fürstenberg

Klemens August Emmerich, 3rd Count of Schönborn-Wiesentheid (8 October 1810 – 24 August 1877) was an Austrian Reichsrat and Member of the Reichstag of the German Empire.

== Early life ==
Schönborn-Wiesentheid was born on 30 January 1846 in Gaibach into the Hochadel (high nobility). He was a younger son of Count Franz Erwein von Schönborn-Wiesentheid and Countess Fernandine von Westphalen zu Fürstenberg. His elder brother was Hugo, 2nd Count of Schönborn-Wiesentheid.

His paternal grandparents were Count Erwein von Schönborn-Buchheim and Countess Maria Anna von Stadion zu Thannhausen und Warthausen. His maternal grandparents were Imperial Count Clemens August von Westphalen zu Fürstenberg (sole heir of his maternal great-uncle, Prince-Bishop of Paderborn William Anton of Asseburg, and his paternal uncle, Prince-Bishop of Hildesheim Friedrich Wilhelm of Westphalia) and Countess Maria Antonia Waldbott von Bassenheim.

== Career ==
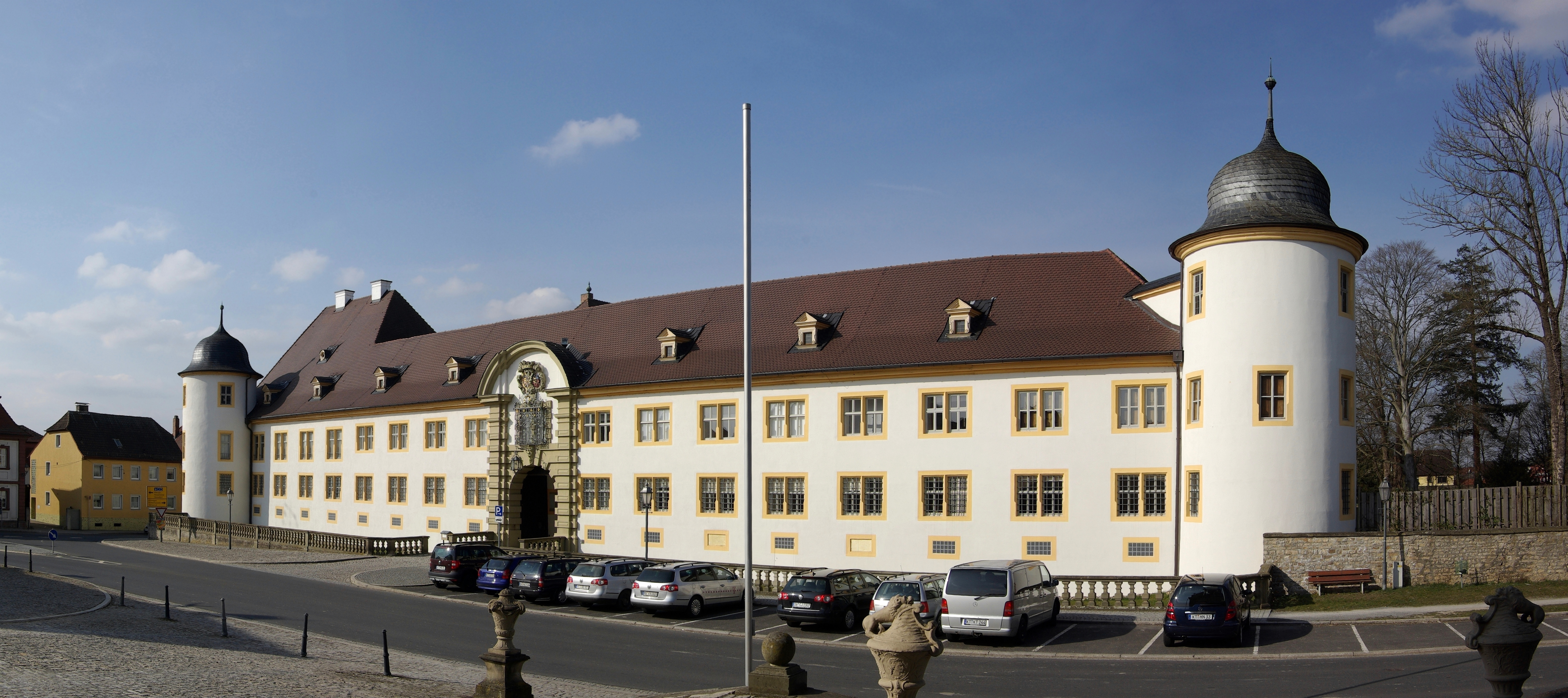
Wiesentheid Castle, built for his ancestor, Rudolf Franz Erwein von Schönborn, in 1701

The County of Schönborn-Wiesentheid was in Lower Franconia, the northwestern Region of modern Bavaria, and comprised various isolated districts spanning from the Regnitz River to the Main River east of Würzburg. Schönborn-Wiesentheid, a partition of Schönborn, inherited the other line of Schönborn-Heusenstamm in 1801 before it was mediatised to Bavaria in 1806.

Upon the death of his father in 1840, his elder brother Hugo became the titular Count of Schönborn-Wiesentheid. Upon his brother's death in 1865, he became the 3rd Count. As a landowner in Lower and Upper Franconia and a hereditary member of the Reichsrat, Schönborn-Wiesentheid was also a member of the Chamber of Imperial Councillors from 1865 to 1877.

From 1874 to 1877, he was a member of the German Reichstag for the constituency of Lower Franconia (Kitzingen) for the Centre Party. In a by-election made necessary by his death on 27 November 1877, his son Friedrich Carl succeeded him in parliament.

== Personal life ==
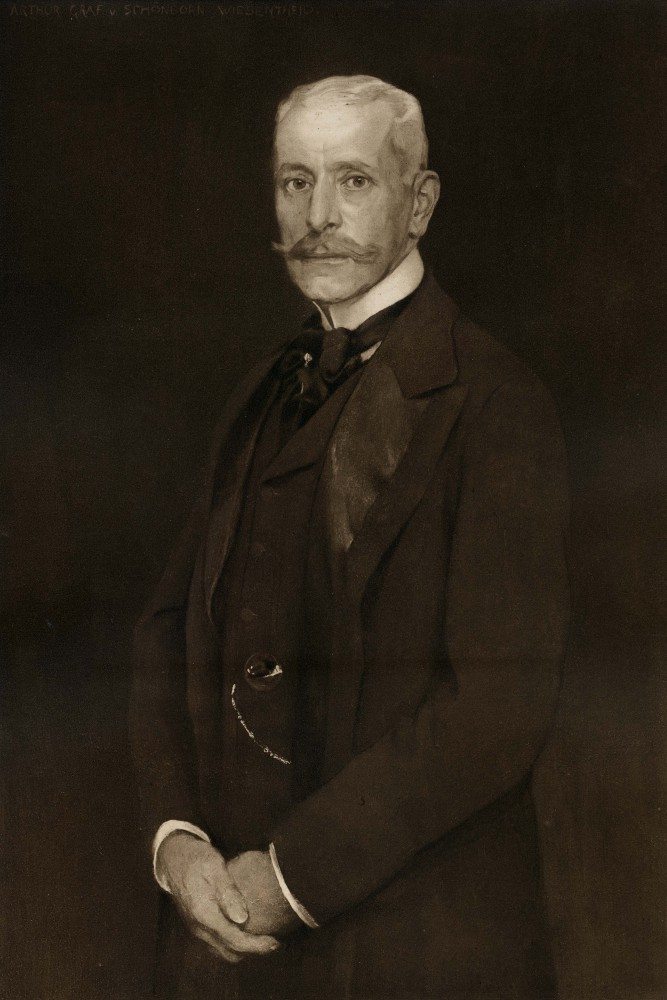
Portrait of his son Arthur, by Philip de László, 1899

He was married to Irene, Countess Batthyány de Német-Ujvár (1811–1891), a daughter of Count Vincenz Batthyány de Német-Ujvár and Josepha Rudnyák de Bátsfa de Magyar Bel, members of a Hungarian Magnate family. Together, they were the parents of:

- Marie Athenaïs Josephine Ferdinande von Schönborn-Wiesentheid (1841–1918), who married Count Otto zu Brandis, the Austrian Ambassador to the Netherlands.
- Sophie Elena Marie "Elma" von Schönborn-Wiesentheid (1841–1884), who married Baron Karl von und zu Franckenstein, the Austro-Hungarian Envoy to the Kingdom of Denmark, Saxony, and the United States.
- Clemens Hugo Damian Erwein von Schönborn-Wiesentheid (1842–1868), who died unmarried.
- Arthur Franz Maximilian von Schönborn-Wiesentheid (1846–1915), who married Princess Stephanie Marie Antonie of Hohenlohe-Schillingsfürst, the second daughter of Princess Marie von Sayn-Wittgenstein-Sayn and Chlodwig, Prince of Hohenlohe-Schillingsfürst.
- Friedrich Karl Emmerich Joseph von Schönborn-Wiesentheid (1847–1913), who married Margravine Julia Pallavicini, a daughter of Oswald Pallavicini.
- Maria Irene Caroline von Schönborn-Wiesentheid (1848–1929), who married Louis Jean Victor, Duke of Bojano in 1873.
- Clemens Philipp Erwein von Schönborn-Wiesentheid (1855–1938), who married Baroness Rosario von Welczeck, a daughter of Baron Bernhard von Welczeck and Countess Louise von Hatzfeldt zu Trachenberg (a daughter of Count Max von Hatzfeldt). Her brother was Count Johannes von Welczeck.

The Count of Schönborn-Wiesentheid died on 24 August 1877 and was succeeded in his hereditary title by his eldest surviving son, Arthur.

=== Descendants ===
Through his son Arthur, he was a grandfather of Maria von Schönborn-Wiesentheid (wife of Count Wolfgang von Oberndorff and Stanislaus, 5th Prince of Sayn-Wittgenstein-Sayn, Johanna von Schönborn-Wiesentheid (wife of Count and Edler Erwein von und zu Eltz gen. Faust von Stromberg), and Erwein von Schönborn-Wiesentheid (who married Donna Ernestina Ruffo, a daughter of Antonio Ruffo, 10th Prince of Scaletta, and Ludovica Borghese).
