= Clemens von und zu Franckenstein =

German composer

Chamberlain of the royal household of the Kingdom of Bavaria
- In office 1912–1918

Personal details
- Born: Clemens Erwein Heinrich Karl Bonaventura, Freiherr von und zu Franckenstein; 14 July 1875 Wiesentheid, Bavaria
- Died: 19 August 1942 (aged 67) Hechendorf am Pilsensee, Bavaria
- Party: Conservative
- Spouse: Maria Nezádal
- Parent(s): Karl, Baron Franckenstein; Elma, Countess Schönborn
- Relatives: Georg von Franckenstein (brother); Joseph von Franckenstein (cousin); Clement von Franckenstein (nephew)
- Education: Schottengymnasium; Hochschule für Musik und Theater München; Hoch Conservatory
- Occupation: Composer; Songwriter; Theatre Director; General Director of the Bavarian State Opera

Clemens Erwein Heinrich Karl Bonaventura Freiherr von und zu Franckenstein (14 July 1875 – 19 August 1942) was a German opera composer.

== Early life ==
Franckenstein was born in Wiesentheid, Germany to Karl, Freiherr von und zu Franckenstein (1831–1898) and Elma, née Countess von Schönborn-Wiesentheid (1841–1884). His brother was Austrian Ambassador to England, Georg von und zu Franckenstein. Georg's son, actor Clement von Franckenstein, was his nephew.

Franckenstein studied in Vienna, Austria, and later in Munich, Germany, with Ludwig Thuille and at the Hoch Conservatory in Frankfurt with Iwan Knorr.

== Career ==
After a visit to the USA he conducted the Moody-Manners Opera Company, acted from 1902–1907 as opera conductor in London, then worked at the court theatres of Wiesbaden and Berlin, until the court theaters were abolished after the First World War. He was the last royal general director of the Bayerische Staatsoper in Munich (1912–1918 and 1924–1934) and the only one who exercised this office twice. He produced the Munich Opera Festival through 1934 when he was forced out by Nazi prohibitions.

== Personal life ==
Franckenstein, who married Maria Nezádal, died in Hechendorf am Pilsensee, Oberbayern, Germany at age 67.

== Stage works ==
- Griseldis. Oper in 3 Akten (Libretto: Oskar Mayer)
- Fortunatus. Oper in 3 Akten (Libretto : Jakob Wassermann)
- Rahab. Oper in 1 Akt (Libretto: Oskar Mayer)
- Die Biene. Pantomime (Libretto: Hugo von Hofmannsthal)
- Li-Tai-Pe, der Kaisers Dichter. Oper in 3 Akten, Op. 43 (1920) (Libretto: Rudolf Lothar)

== Orchestral works ==
- Rhapsodie für Orchester op. 47.
- Variations on a theme by Meyerbeer
- Dance suite
- Serenade
- Praeludium
- Symphonic suite
- Das alte Lied
- Four dances
- Festival Prelude
