= Winterfeldt =

Winterfeld is a surname. It may refer to:

- Jørgen Balthazar Winterfeldt (1732-1821) Danish naval officer and philanthropist
- Hans Karl von Winterfeldt (1707–1757), Prussian general
- Detlof von Winterfeldt (1867–1940), German officer and military attaché
