= Karl von und zu Franckenstein =

Austrian-Hungarian diplomat

Austro-Hungarian Envoy to the Kingdom of Denmark
- In office 1880–1888
- Preceded by: Gustav Kálnoky von Kőröspatak
- Succeeded by: Maximilian von Gagern (as Chargé d'Affaires)

Austro-Hungarian Envoy to the Kingdom of Saxony
- In office 1872–1879
- Preceded by: Ludwig Paar
- Succeeded by: Anton von Wolkenstein-Trostburg

Austro-Hungarian Envoy to the United States (Acting) (as Chargé d'Affaires)
- In office 1867–1868
- Preceded by: Ferdinand von Wydenbruck (as Imperial and Royal Minister of the Austrian Empire)
- Succeeded by: Karl von Lederer

Personal details
- Born: Karl Borromäus Vincenz Franz, Freiherr von und zu Franckenstein; 22 January 1831 Frankfurt, Germany
- Died: 2 February 1898 (aged 67) Vienna, Austria
- Spouse: Elma von Schönborn-Wiesentheid (m. 1872; died 1884)
- Children: Leopoldine von und zu Franckenstein; Clemens von und zu Franckenstein; Georg von und zu Franckenstein
- Parent(s): Karl, Baron Franckenstein; Leopoldine, Countess Apponyi de Nagy-Appony

Karl Borromäus Vincenz Franz, Freiherr von und zu Franckenstein (22 January 1831 – 2 February 1898) was an Austro-Hungarian diplomat.

== Early life ==
Baron von Franckenstein was born on 22 January 1831 in Frankfurt, Hessen. He was a younger son of Imperial Baron Karl Arbogast von und zu Franckenstein, the Royal Chamberlain and Hereditary Imperial Councillor of the Crown of Bavaria, and his wife Leopoldine, née Countess Apponyi de Nagy-Appony. After his father's death in 1845, his elder brother, Georg Arbogast von Franckenstein, took over management of the family estates. George, a member of the Bavarian House of Councillors and First Vice President of the Reichstag, and married Princess Marie of Oettingen-Wallerstein (niece of Prince Louis of Oettingen-Wallerstein).

He was a member of the ancient noble Franckenstein family of the Franconian Imperial Knighthood in the Odenwald, which owned the Middle Franconian fideicommissum Ullstadt and other properties in Baden and Hesse.

== Career ==
As a diplomat of the Austrian Empire, Baron von Franckenstein served as legation secretary for the Federal Presidential Envoy in Frankfurt. (Note: After Napoleon was defeated during the Napoleonic Wars and abdicated control over the French Empire, the Congress of Vienna (1814–1815) dissolved the Grand Duchy of Frankfurt and Frankfurt became a fully sovereign city-state with a republican form of government. Frankfurt entered the newly founded German Confederation as a free city (from 1813–1866), becoming the seat of its Bundestag, the confederal parliament where the nominally presiding Habsburg Emperor of Austria was represented by an Austrian "presidential envoy".) As businessman, he moved to the United States in 1860. When the Austro-Hungarian Empire was formed, he served as Chargé d'Affaires of the Empire's embassy in Washington, D.C., becoming acting Minister to the U.S. from 1867 to 1868.

Franckenstein then served as Envoy Extraordinary and Minister Plenipotentiary to the Kingdom of Saxony in Dresden from 1872 to 1879 and in Copenhagen from 1880 to 1888.

== Personal life ==
In Würzburg in 1872, Baron von Franckenstein was married to Sophie Elena Marie "Elma", Countess von Schönborn-Wiesentheid (1841–1884), a daughter of Klemens, 3rd Count of Schönborn-Wiesentheid (which was mediatised to Bavaria in 1806) and Irene, Countess Batthyány de Német-Ujvár. Her brother, Arthur, 4th Count of Schönborn-Wiesentheid, married Princess Stephanie of Hohenlohe-Schillingsfürst (daughter of Chlodwig, Prince of Hohenlohe-Schillingsfürst). Together, they were the parents of:

- Leopoldine von und zu Franckenstein (1874–1918), who married Gustav Hermann von Passavant, a son of Philipp Hermann Passavant.
- Clemens von und zu Franckenstein (1875–1942), an opera composer who married Maria Nezádal.
- Georg von und zu Franckenstein (1878–1953), the Austrian Minister to the Court of St James who married Editha King.

Franckenstein died in Vienna on 2 February 1898.

=== Descendants ===
Through his son Georg, he was a grandfather of actor Clement von und zu Franckenstein (1944–2019).

== Gallery ==
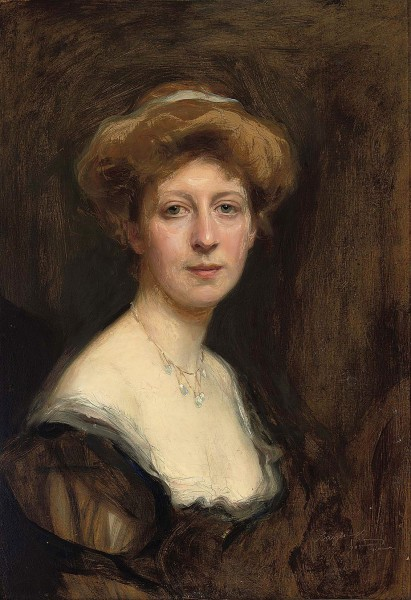
Baroness Leopoldine von Franckenstein, by Philip de László, 1905

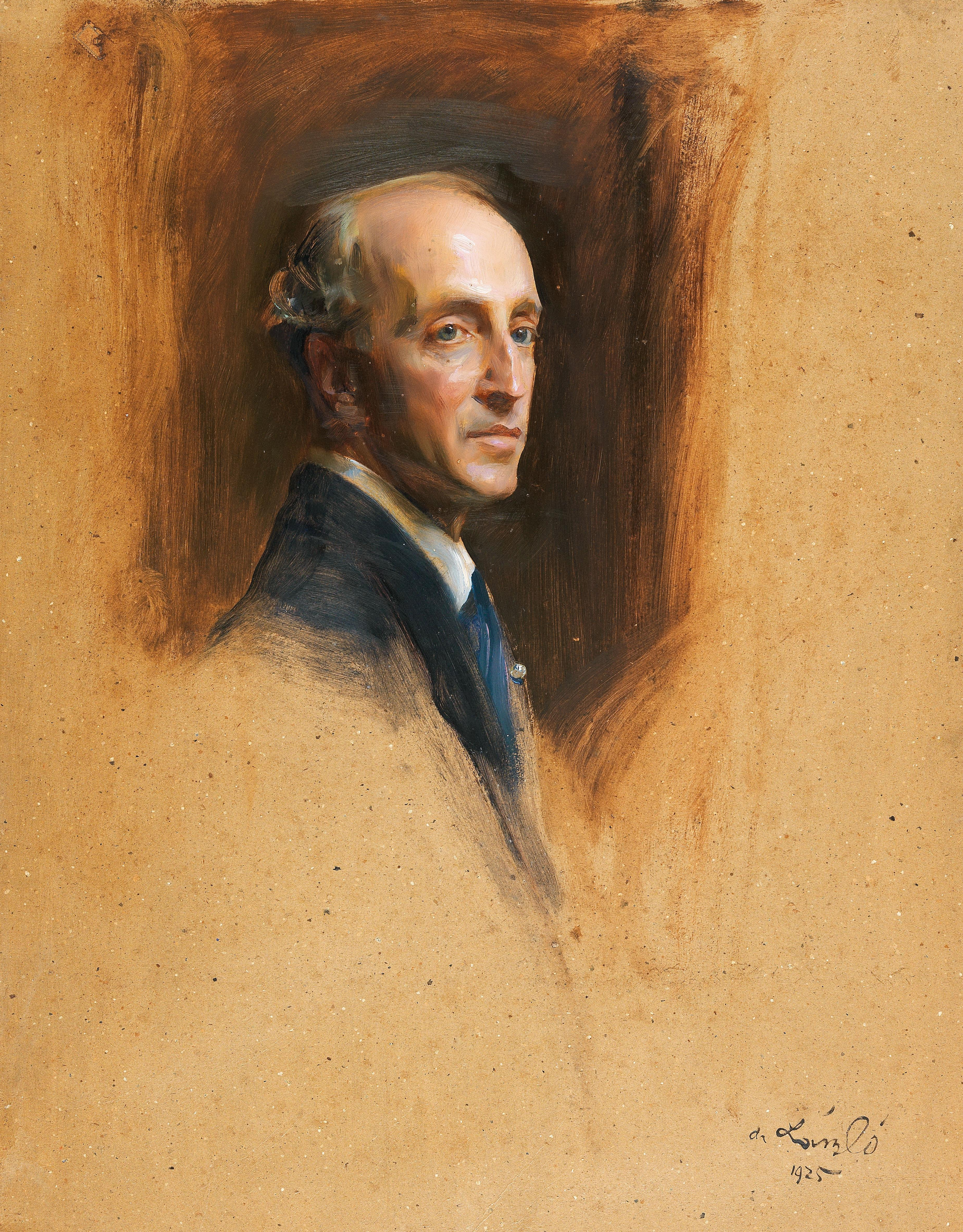
Study portrait of Baron Georg Franckenstein by Philip de László, 1925

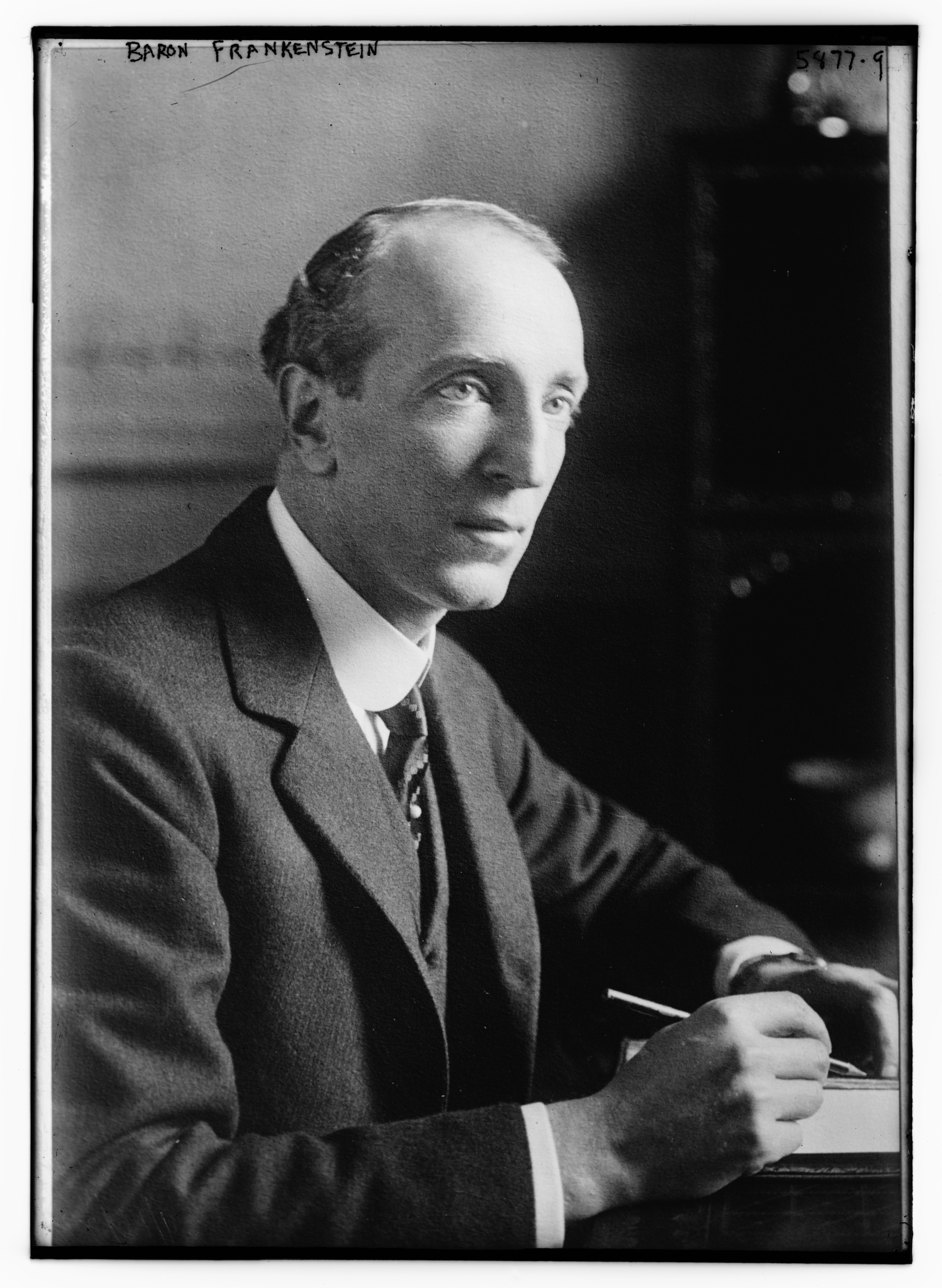
Photograph of Georg von und zu Franckenstein, c. 1920–1925, when he was Austrian Minister to the Court of St James
