= Constitution Column (Gaibach) =

Cultural heritage monument D-6–75-174-257 (0) in Volkach, Bavaria

Coordinates: 49°53′52″N 10°13′27″E

- Konstitutionssäule
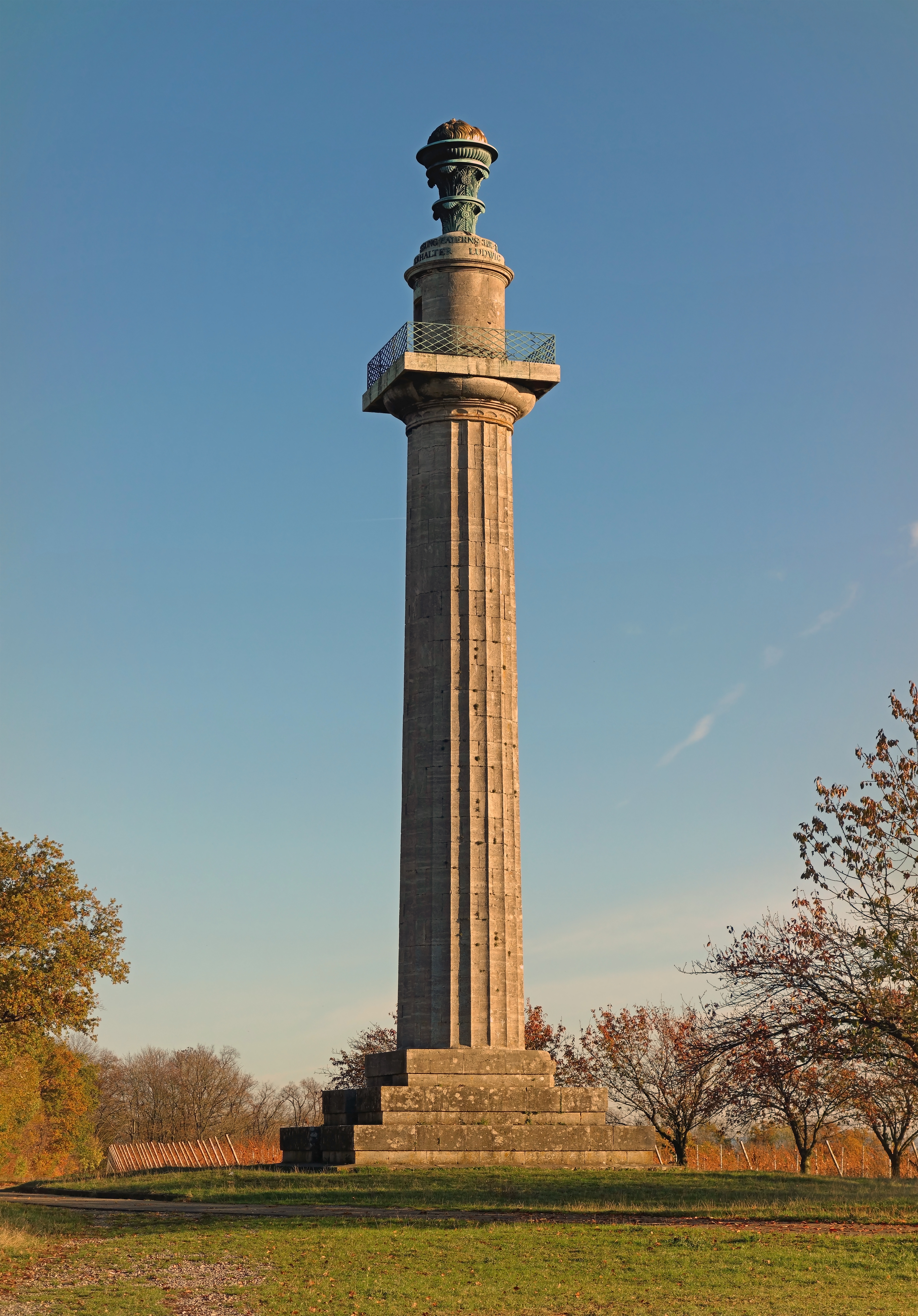
- Interactive map of Constitution Column
- Location: Gaibach
- Designer: Leo von Klenze
- Type: Column
- Height: 32 m (105 ft)
- Beginning date: 26 May 1821
- Opening date: 22 August 1828
- Dedicated to: Bavarian Constitution of 1818

The Constitution Column (Konstitutionssäule) is a 32 metre high landmark in the village of Gaibach, now a district of the town of Volkach in Lower Franconia in Germany. It is in the Schlosspark surrounding the Schloss Gaibach on the Hügel des Sonnenbergs just off Staatsstraße 2271.

== History ==
The column commemorates the Bavarian Constitution of 1818, in which Maximilian I Joseph of Bavaria voluntarily limited his powers and shared them with elected representatives. It was built by count Franz Erwein von Schönborn-Wiesentheid, who had to give up all rights as prince due to German mediatisation in 1803 but still advocated the idea of a "magna charta Bavariae".

He commissioned his friend Leo von Klenze as the column's architect, though his designs had to reworked several times. It has a triple pedestal and an observation deck at the top - its overall form is neoclassical and reminiscent of Trajan's Column in Rome. The foundation stone was laid on 26 May 1821, in the presence of Crown Prince Ludwig and several dignitaries from Würzburg. After a service in the Church of the Holy Trinity in Gaibach, the party set off up the mountain. The ceremony is shown in an 1823 oil painting by Peter von Hess. Its dedication inscription reads "This monument [is dedicated to] the Constitution of Bavaria, her creator Max Joseph, her preserver Ludwig"

It was inaugurated on 22 August 1828, with Ludwig (now king) one of the guests of honour. Several commemorative coins were struck to mark the event and the anniversary of the inauguration was marked annually until 1831, when Ludwig stopped his reform program from fear of the July Revolution in France. In 1832 supporters of German unification tried to have a meeting at the column on the anniversary of its inauguration in sympathy with the Hambach Festival and tried to put black-red-gold flags on it, but their ringleaders were arrested. The commemorations of the anniversary only resumed on the 150th anniversary of the constitution in 1968.

== Bibliography ==
- Herbert Meyer: Die Konstitutionssäule und ihre Geschichte. In: Ute Feuerbach (ed.): Unsere Mainschleife. Beiträge zu Kunst und Geschichte an der Volkacher Mainschleife. Volkach 2008.
- Karl Treutwein: Von Abtswind bis Zeilitzheim. Geschichtliches, Sehenswertes, Überlieferungen. Volkach 1987.
