= Clement von Franckenstein =

English actor (1944–2019)

- Born: 28 May 1944; Sunninghill, Berkshire, England
- Died: 9 May 2019 (aged 74); Los Angeles, California, U.S.
- Resting place: Hollywood Forever Cemetery
- Other name: Clement St. George
- Occupation: Actor
- Years active: 1971–2019
- Title: Freiherr von und zu Franckenstein
- Relatives: Joseph Freiherr von Franckenstein (uncle); Clemens von und zu Franckenstein (uncle); Karl von und zu Franckenstein (grandfather)
- Family: Franckenstein

Clement George Freiherr von und zu Franckenstein (28 May 1944 – 9 May 2019) was an English actor, best known for his film and television work in the United States. A member of the Franckenstein family, he was the only son of Austrian diplomat and dissident Georg von und zu Franckenstein. Between 1975 and 1989, he was credited under the stage name Clement St. George.

== Family ==
Franckenstein was the only child of Editha and Georg von und zu Franckenstein. His father was an Austrian Reichsfreiherr (nobleman) and diplomat who emigrated to England after the Anschluss (annexation of Austria by Nazi Germany) and received a British knighthood and British nationality. One of his paternal uncles was the philologist Joseph von Franckenstein, and another was composer Clemens von und zu Franckenstein. After the death of his father, Franckenstein inherited the title of Freiherr von und zu Franckenstein.

== Early life ==
Franckenstein was born in Sunninghill, then in Buckinghamshire, on 28 May 1944. His parents died in an aircraft crash in Germany on 14 October 1953, and from the age of nine he was brought up by his parents' British friends. He was educated at Sunningdale School and Eton College. He served in the British Army, in the Royal Scots Greys, for three years and was discharged as a Lieutenant.

== Career ==
With aspirations towards becoming an opera singer, Franckenstein trained as a tenor for three years and performed in cabarets and musicals, but ultimately decided to pursue acting instead. He initially went to castings as Clement St George as he thought "his real name might scare people". He moved to California in 1972 and joined the gentleman-playboy expat Brits like David Niven.

Franckenstein appeared in some eighty films; sometimes as the debonair escort for the leading lady or just wearing a leather thong. He was in Young Frankenstein, Robin Hood: Men in Tights and The American President, but was often low down the cast list or uncredited. He appeared as a corpse in Murder She Wrote.

He said that California changed between the 1970s and the 1990s, as he told the Daily Telegraph in 1994: "In the 1970s, life was easy, everyone was laid-back, everyone had a good time ... Now it has become oppressive, charmless. You can't smoke in restaurants, everyone is carrying around boxes of condoms, and at parties now there's this thing called the "no host bar" - you have to pay for your own bloody drinks. I mean it's just not on".

Franckenstein told stories from his life for the Joe Frank radio show, 'Clement at Christmas', from his childhood though his early days in Hollywood, the first half of the show.

== Personal life ==
Playing with Hugh Grant and Mick Jagger, Franckenstein was a long-standing member of the Beverly Hills Cricket Club.

== Death ==
Von Franckenstein died from hypoxia at the Cedars-Sinai Medical Center in Los Angeles, on 9 May 2019 at the age of 74. He had been in an induced coma for ten days.

== Selected filmography ==
- The Slams (1973) - Minor Role (uncredited)
- Young Frankenstein (1974) - Villager Screaming at the Monster from the Bars (uncredited)
- Lepke (1975) - Bugsy Siegel
- Marilyn and the Senator (1975)
- Fantasm (1976) - High Priest (segment "Blood Orgy")
- Hughes and Harlow: Angels in Hell (1977) - Reggie
- The Happy Hooker Goes to Washington (1977) - Doctor
- The Gypsy Warriors (1978) - British M.P.
- Time After Time (1979) - Bobby
- Cataclysm (1980) - (voice)
- Six Weeks (1982) - TV Interviewer
- Olivia (1983) - Lawyer
- The Man Who Wasn't There (1983) - Grey Crusher
- Monaco Forever (1984) - B.B.C. Broadcaster
- KGB: The Secret War (1985) - Yuri Glebov
- Mission Kill (1986) - Ian Kennedy
- The Boost (1988) - Maitre D' - Mortons
- The Lords of Magick (1989) - Edgar
- Underground (1989) - (uncredited)
- Transylvania Twist (1989) - Hans Hoff
- The Haunting of Morella (1990) - Judge Brock
- The Invisible Maniac (1990) - Dr. McWaters
- Lionheart (1990) - English Investor
- Brush with Death (1990) - Truman
- Shining Through (1992) - BBC Interviewer
- Body Parts (1992) - Jacoby
- Live Wire (1992) - Dr. Bernard
- Death Becomes Her (1992) - Opening Man
- American Ninja V (1993) - Glock
- Robin Hood: Men in Tights (1993) - Royal Announcer
- Over the Line (1993) - Dean Hemsley
- Fatal Instinct (1993) - (uncredited)
- T-Force (1994) - UN Ambassador Chris Olsen
- The American President (1995) - President D'Astier
- Dark Secrets (1996) - Clement
- The Evening Star (1996) - Pascal Ferney
- The Beast Within: A Gabriel Knight Mystery (1996) - Herr Von Aigner
- Jamaica Beat (1997) - Commissioner Byron Highsmith
- The Landlady (1998) - Laurence Gerard
- Intimate Lives: The Women of Manet (1998) - Antoine
- The Debtors (1999)
- Ty the Tasmanian Tiger (2002) - Boss Cass
- Just Married (2003) - Car Rental Clerk
- The Bard's Tale (2004)
- Ty the Tasmanian Tiger 2: Bush Rescue (2004) - Boss Cass
- Ty the Tasmanian Tiger 3: Night of the Quinkan (2005) - Boss Cass
- Vidrio roto (2007)
- The Kreutzer Sonata (2008) - Party Guest
- Tony 5 (2008) - Rufus
- The Least Among You (2009) - Stansfield Tremaine
- Command Performance (2009) - Ambassador Jim Bradley
- The Future (2011) - Alain First Solicitation
- Take Me Home Tonight (2011) - Frances Triebverbrecher
- Hopelessly in June (2011) - Sebastian Teal
- The Five-Year Engagement (2012) - Grandpa Baba
- Wallenda (2012) - Louis Weitzmann
- Micky's Summer Resort (2014) - Congressman Brian Moley
- Unfinished Business (2015) - Armand (uncredited)
- Hail, Caesar! (2016) - Sen. Sestimus Amydias
- Somebody's Mother (2016) - Monty
- The Matadors (2017) - Lord Rothchild
- Angels on Tap (2018) - Harry
- Red Handed (2019) - Tillman
