= Franz Erwein von Schönborn-Wiesentheid =

- Count of Schönborn-Wiesentheid
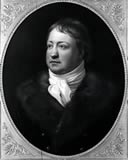
- Born: Franz Erwein Damian Joseph von Schönborn-Wiesentheid; 4 April 1776; Mainz
- Died: 15 December 1840 (aged 64); Frankfurt am Main
- Spouse: Fernandine von Westphalen zu Fürstenberg (m. 1802; died 1813)
- Issue: Hugo von Schönborn-Wiesentheid; Maria Anna von Schönborn-Wiesentheid; Klemens von Schönborn-Wiesentheid; Franz von Schönborn-Wiesentheid
- House: Schönborn-Wiesentheid
- Father: Hugo Damian Erwein von Schönborn-Wiesentheid
- Mother: Maria Anna von Stadion zu Thannhausen und Warthausen

Franz Erwein, 1st Count of Schönborn-Wiesentheid (4 April 1776 – 15 December 1840) was a German art collector and politician from the House of Schönborn.

== Early life ==
His parents were the Hugo Damian Erwein von Schönborn-Wiesentheid (1738–1817), a chamberlain and member of the counsel from Aschaffenburg, and his wife Maria Anna (1746–1817), who had been countess of Stadion zu Thannhausen und Warthausen.

From 1792 onwards he studied at Jura and the University of Würzburg.

== Career ==
In 1802, Franz also took over the entail on the Schönborn-Besitzungen in the Holy Roman Empire.

In 1806 the county of Wiesentheid was handed over to the Kingdom of Bavaria as part of German Mediatisation. As a result, Franz Erwein von Schönborn mainly focused on administering his Frankish estates and those in the wine-growing areas of Rheingau. In 1811 he and his family moved to Munich, where he met Ludwig, Crown Prince of Bavaria the following year. He was given the rank of major general in the Bavarian army and began to operate as an art collector, making contact with several major artists.

On his wife's death in 1813, Schönborn moved to Schloss Gaibach, rebuilding it between 1800 and 1830. He also added a park in the English style, in which he built a Constitution Column. The column was designed by Schönborn's friend Leo von Klenze and commemorated Maximilian I Joseph's 1818 grant of a Constitution to the Kingdom of Bavaria. In 1828 he also completed a Constitution Hall in the castle, painted at von Klenze's suggestion by Carl Heinrich Hermann and Jakob Götzenberger, two of Peter von Cornelius's pupils. Schönborn's collection ranked alongside Ludwig's own as two of the most notable ones in southern Germany.

As a state counselor of Bavaria, Schönborn was a member of the state's Imperial Council from 1819 until his death. He sometimes served as Vice President of the Privy Council, in which capacity he represented the Council at the 1819 funeral of Anton Eggstein, the first Bavarian member of parliament to die in office. Schönborn was also hereditarily appointed as a member of the first chamber of the Nassau Landstände according to the Nassau Ducal Edict of 29 October 1831. He was elected from 1832 to 1837.

== Personal life ==
On 29 July 1802, he married Countess Fernandine of Westphalia zu Fürstenberg (1781–1813). Fernandine, who was from Hildesheim, was the daughter of the Imperial Count Clemens August von Westphalen zu Fürstenberg (sole heir of his maternal great-uncle, Prince-Bishop of Paderborn William Anton of Asseburg, and his paternal uncle, Prince-Bishop of Hildesheim Friedrich Wilhelm of Westphalia) and Countess Maria Antonia Waldbott von Bassenheim. Together, they were the parents of:

- Hugo von Schönborn-Wiesentheid (1805–1865), who married Countess Sophie von und zu Eltz genannt Faust von Stromberg, in 1833.
- Maria Anna von Schönborn-Wiesentheid (1809–1856), who married, as his second wife, Baron Maximilian von Loë in 1840. Loë's son from his first marriage was Baron Walter von Loë.
- Klemens von Schönborn-Wiesentheid (1810–1877), who married Countess Irene Batthyány de Német-Ujvár, in 1838.
- Franz von Schönborn-Wiesentheid (1813–1844)

The Count of Schönborn-Wiesentheid died on 15 December 1840, and was succeeded by his eldest son, Hugo.
