= Eggestein =

Eggestein, or Eggstein is a German surname that may refer to

- Heinrich Eggestein (c. 1415/1420 – c. 1488), German book printer
- Johannes Eggestein (born 1998), German football player
- Maximilian Eggestein (born 1996), German football player, brother of Johannes
- Anton Eggstein, (1780-1819), German brewer and politician
