= Edingen-Neckarhausen =

- Municipality
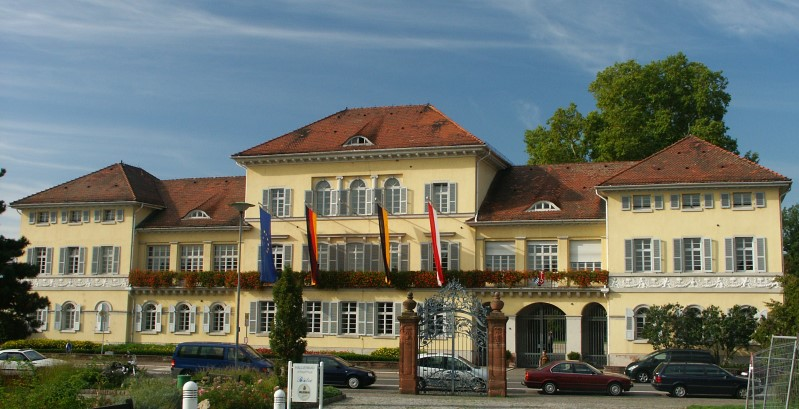
- Palace (Schloß) at Neckarhausen

- Coat of arms

- Location of Edingen-Neckarhausen within Rhein-Neckar-Kreis district
- Interactive map of Edingen-Neckarhausen
- Location within Germany Location within Baden-Württemberg
- Coordinates: 49°17′N 8°37′E
- Country: Germany
- State: Baden-Württemberg
- Admin. region: Karlsruhe
- District: Rhein-Neckar-Kreis
- Subdivisions: 2 villages

Government
  - Mayor (2022–30): Florian König (CDU)

Area
  - Total: 12.04 km^{2} (4.65 sq mi)
- Elevation: 104 m (341 ft)

Population (2025-12-31)
  - Total: 14,714
  - Density: 1,222/km^{2} (3,165/sq mi)
- Time zone: UTC+01:00 (CET)
  - Summer (DST): UTC+02:00 (CEST)
- Postal codes: 68527–68535
- Dialling codes: 06203 and 0621
- Vehicle registration: HD

Edingen-Neckarhausen (Palatine German: Edinge-Neggerhause) is a municipality in the district of Rhein-Neckar-Kreis, in Baden-Württemberg, Germany. It is situated on the left bank of the Neckar.

== Geography ==
Edingen-Neckarhausen lies about 12 km south-east of Mannheim and somewhat closer (about 8 km) northwest of Heidelberg. Directly on the opposite bank of the Neckar is the city of Ladenburg.

=== Boroughs ===
The municipality consists of two boroughs:

- Edingen (with Neu-Edingen)
- Neckarhausen

The borough of Neu-Edingen combined with Mannheim-Friedrichsfeld create a big village. The border between the two can only be identified by the town demarcation signs in the middle of the village.

== History ==
Edingen and Neckarhausen have been settled since the time of the Celts, because of the mild climate and fertile soil.

Coat of arms for Edingen until 1977

=== Edingen ===
Edingen was first mentioned in the Lorsch codex on 17 November 765 in a grant document of the Lorsch Abbey, in which the village was granted to Lopodonum (today Ladenburg). The manor of Edingen belonged to the Imperial Abbey of Lorsch and the Bishopric of Worms. At the end of the 12th century, the count palatine took over lordship of the town until 1802.

=== Neckarhausen ===
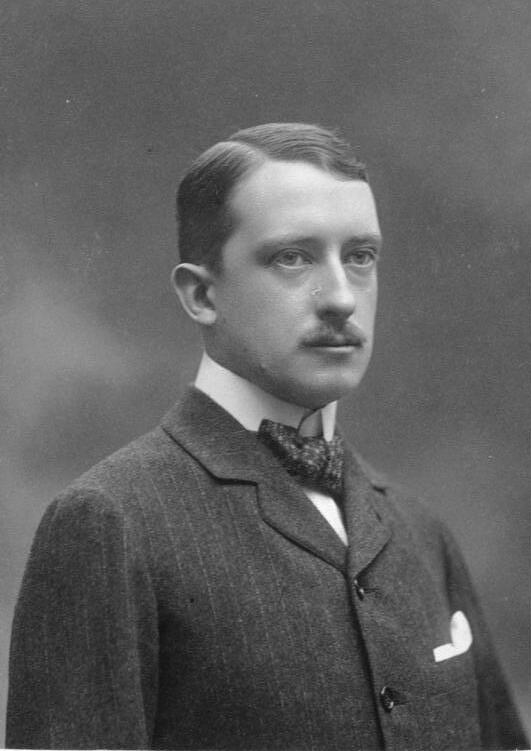
Count Alfred von Oberndorff

Shortly after Edingen, Neckarhausen was mentioned in the Lorsch codex for the first time on 26 June 773. Between the end of the 14th century and 1705, the Bishopric of Worms and the counts Palatine shared lordship over the town. Afterwards, lordship fell to the Palatinate alone.

After court of the Electors Palantine moved away from Mannheim to Munich in the year 1778, the secret state and conference minister, Franz Albert Freiherr von Oberndorff (1720–1799) became governor for the prince-elector Karl Theodor in Mannheim. As part of his reward, he was raised to a count (Graf) in 1790. Neckarhausen became the family seat of the young dynasty. Before the village are the clan holdings.

The last of the Oberndorff line to live at Neckarhausen, Count Alfred von Oberndorff (1870–1963), was German ambassador in Oslo, Sofia, and Warsaw, and was representative of the foreign office in the armistice negotiations in November 1918 in Compiègne. They are both buried in the local graveyard.

=== Edingen-Neckarhausen ===
Coat of arms for Neckarhausen until 1977

In 1803 both villages became part of Baden. On 3 May 1975 the villages were united in the municipal reform as Edingen-Neckarhausen.

== Government ==
The last municipal election was held 13 June 2004.

=== Municipal council ===
The municipal council is made up of 22 members.

Municipal Council 2014
Party	Votes	Seats
CDU	30,53%	7
Independent Citizens List Unabhängige Bürgerliste (UBL a union between the Freie Wähler Verein and the FDP)	26,52%	6
SPD	25,69%	5
Green	17,26%	4
Voter Participation: 55,67%

=== Coat of arms ===
With the union of Edingen and Neckarhausen the coat of arms was remade. The cross of Lorsch refers to the historic relationship with the Lorsch Abbey. The lion of the Palatinate was already present on the coat of arms of Neckarhausen.

The flag is red and white and together with the coat of arms was awarded by the Rhein-Neckar district administration office in 1977.

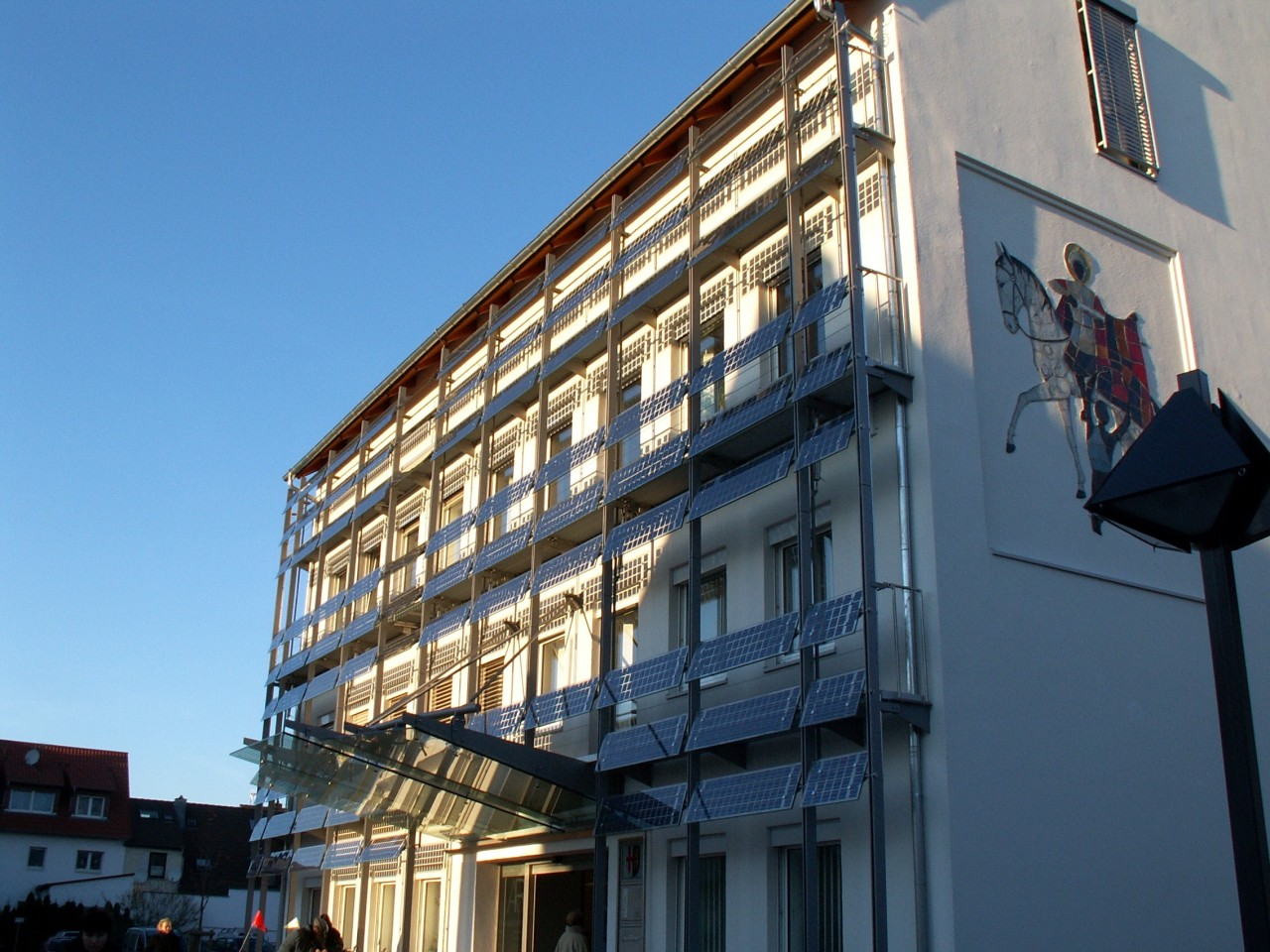
City Hall in Edingen

=== Sister cities ===
- Plouguerneau, France since 1967

== Economy and infrastructure ==
=== Transportation ===
The municipality lies on the Bundesautobahn 656, connecting Mannheim and Heidelberg, as well as the state road (Landesstraße), the L637 (formerly the B37), running parallel. Across the A656, just a few minutes away, are the A5 and A6.

Edingen-Neckarhausen is connected to Ladenburg on the other side of the Neckar, by a regular ferry and a railway bridge, that can be used by bicyclists as well as pedestrians.

Public transit is handled by the Rhein-Neckar-Verkehr (RNV) GmbH. The downtown areas of Mannheim and Heidelberg can be reached in 20 and 15 minutes, respectively. The municipality belongs to the transit authority Verkehrsverbund Rhein-Neckar (VRN). In the borough of Edingen, you can find a train station of the MVV OEG AG next to a siding and an engine house. The Deutsche Bahn train station, Mannheim-Friedrichsfeld, is in the borough Neu-Edingen and part of Edingen-Neckarhausen.

== Public works ==
=== Schools ===
- Pestalozzi-Schule in Edingen (primary school. Classes 1 - 4.)
- Graf-von-Oberndorff-Schule in Neckarhausen (primary and secondary school with applied trade school)
- Volkshochschule Edingen-Neckarhausen (adult school)
- Satellite school of the Mannheim music school

=== Government offices ===
The government of the municipality is coordinated in the newly refurbished city hall in Edingen. In Schloss Neckarhausen is a satellite office with mit public services and registry office.

=== Recreational and sport facilities ===
- Public swimming pool in Neckarhausen
- Indoor swimming pool in the Pestalozzi-Schule in Edingen
- Sport and cultural center (in Plouguerneau-Allee)
- Sporthalle Edingen (gymnasium with bowling alley)
- School sport field in Edingen
- Tennis courts in Edingen and Neckarhausen
- Sport facilities of the Sportvereine (sport club) Victoria and DJK (Catholic sports club) in Neckarhausen
- Dog clubs in Edingen und Neckarhausen
- Boule facilities in Neckarhausen

== Culture and sights ==
=== Natural monuments ===
The shore of the Neckar.

=== Museums ===
Museum in the Schloss Neckarhausen

=== Buildings ===
The classical palace of the counts (Grafen) von Oberndorff in Neckarhausen.

=== Regular events ===
- The festival Rund ums Schloss (All round the palace) in Neckarhausen annually on the second weekend of July
- The Neckarhausen Kermesse annually on the first weekend in September
- The Edingen Kermesse annually on the first weekend in October
- Gockelfest (Rooster Festival)
- Fischerfest (Fishing Festival) annually on the third weekend in August

== Notable natives ==
- Alfred von Oberndorff (1870-1963), German diplomat

=== Honorary citizens ===
- Werner Herold, former mayor
- Georg Kohler, former municipal council chairman, recipient of the Bundesverdienstkreuz (Federal Cross of Merit) and Bundesverdienstkreuz first class
