= Georg von und zu Franckenstein =

Austrian diplomat

Sir George Franckenstein GCVO
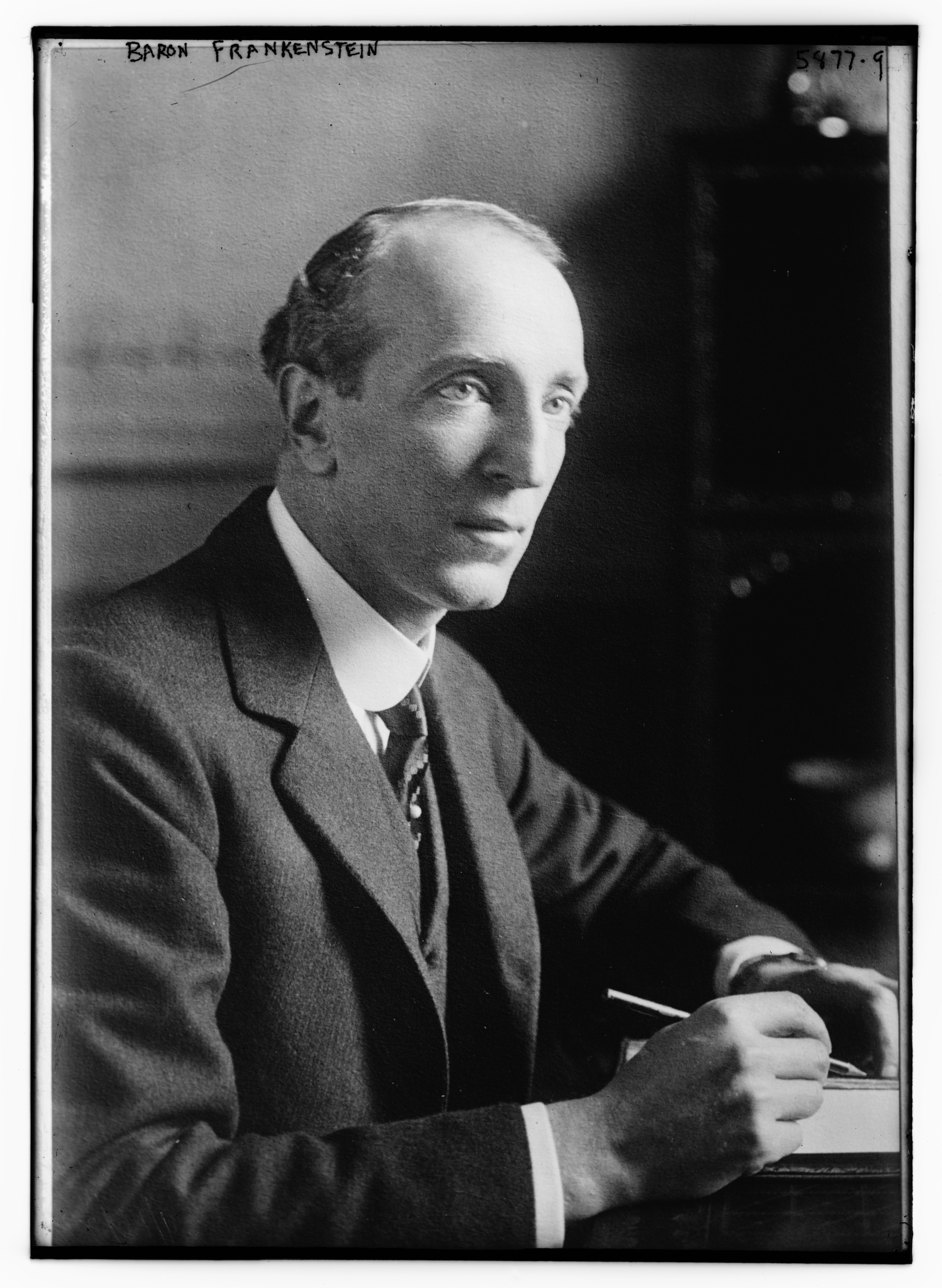
- Franckenstein c. 1920–1925

Austrian Minister to the Court of St James
- In office 1920–1938
- Preceded by: Albert von Mensdorff-Pouilly-Dietrichstein (as Ambassador of Austria-Hungary)
- Succeeded by: Heinrich Schmid

Personal details
- Born: Georg Albert Maria, Freiherr von und zu Franckenstein; 18 March 1878 Dresden, Germany
- Died: 14 October 1953 (aged 75) Kelsterbach, Germany
- Spouse: Editha King (m. 1939; died 1953)
- Relations: Clemens von und zu Franckenstein (brother) Joseph Freiherr von Franckenstein (cousin)
- Children: Clement von Franckenstein
- Parent(s): Karl, Baron Franckenstein; Elma, Countess Schönborn
- Occupation: Diplomat; Austrian Minister to the Court of St James's, Westminster
- Known for: Austro-German aristocrat opposing the Nazi Regime

Georg Albert Maria, Freiherr von und zu Franckenstein GCVO (18 March 1878 – 14 October 1953), known as Sir George Franckenstein, was an Austrian diplomat and a member of the Franckenstein family. Opposed to the Nazis, he became a British citizen when his post was suppressed in 1938.

== Early life ==
Franckenstein was born in Dresden, Saxony, the son of Karl, Baron von und zu Franckenstein (1831–1898), a diplomat of the Austro-Hungarian Empire, and his wife, Elma, née Countess von Schönborn-Wiesentheid (1841–1884). He was the younger brother of the composer and General Intendant of Munich Clemens von und zu Franckenstein (1875–1942).

Georg spent his youth between Franconia and Vienna. Educated at the famous Schottengymnasium, followed by the study of politics and law at the University of Vienna.

== Career ==
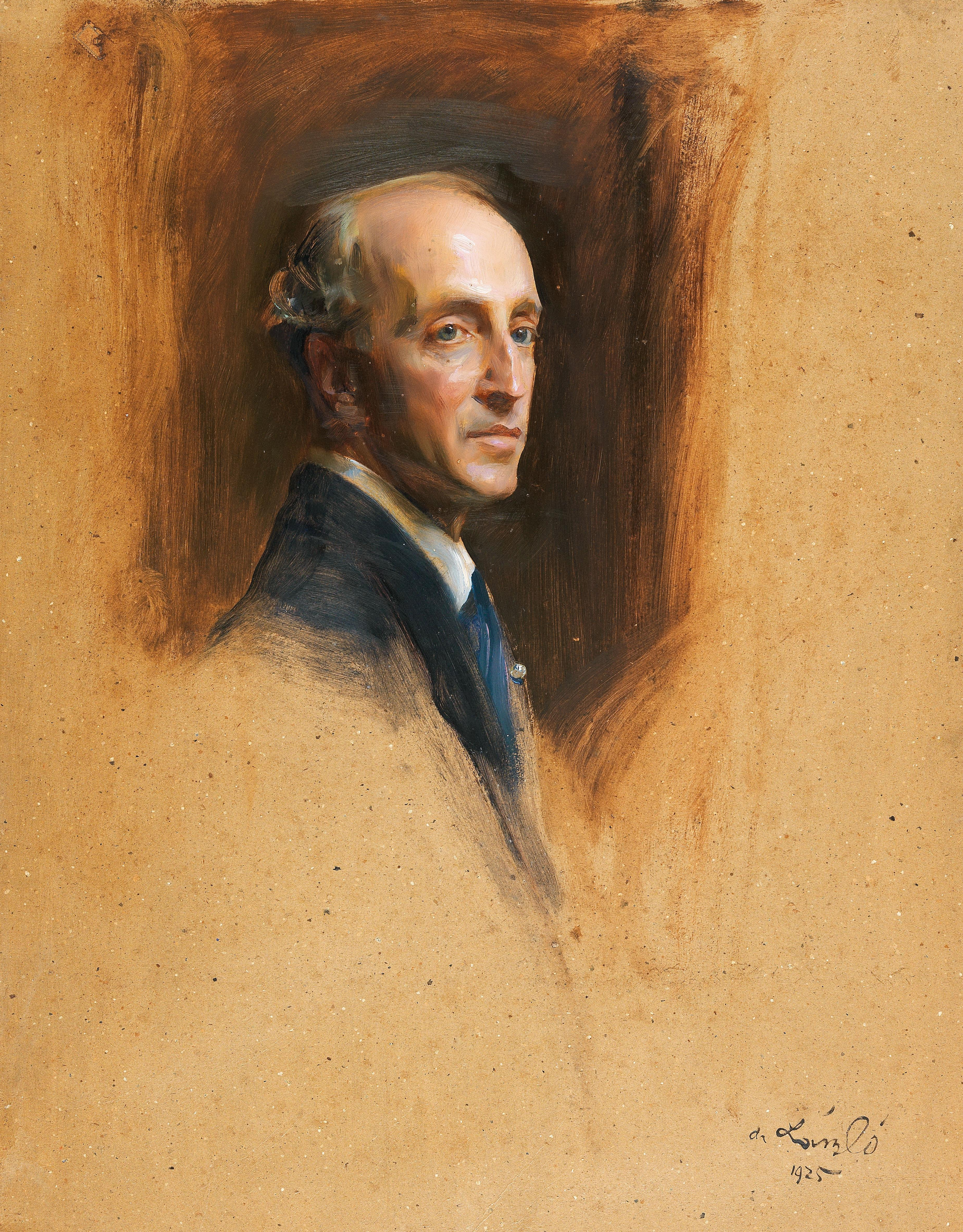
Study portrait of Baron Franckenstein, by Philip de Laszlo, 1925

After university, he joined the Ministry of Foreign Affairs of the Austrian Empire to become a career diplomat. His first posting took him to Washington D.C., followed by the Russian imperial Court in Saint Petersburg and Rome. After a short interlude at the Ministry of Foreign Affairs in Vienna, he was ordered to the Japanese Imperial Court, then to India, and finally to Brussels, before becoming K+K Kommerzdirektor of the Austrian Embassy to the Court of St James's, Westminster. The beginning of the First World War in 1914 forced him to leave Britain and return home.

During the First World War, Franckenstein was, inter alia, diplomatic representative of the Habsburg-Monarchy in the German-occupied territories of Belgium and in 1918 in the Caucasus, occupied by the central powers, where he tried together with his German colleague General Kress von Kressenstein to help the Armenian refugees. In 1919 he was a member of Austria's delegation for concluding peace with the Allies at Saint-Germain. On 13 October 1920, Franckenstein returned to London as the diplomatic representative of the new Republic of Austria. He then served as Austrian Minister to the Court of St. James's for eighteen years, from 1920 to 1938.

Due to his sumptuous and representative style of living, especially by hosting concerts and masked balls, he strongly assured his high society esteem, where – although aristocracy had been abolished in Austria by 1919 – he was still addressed as "Baron Franckenstein". In the early 1920s he could clear the massive financial tilt of his country, thanks to his contacts in London and through arranging an international Government Bond. In 1935, he was awarded an honorary degree by the University of Oxford. In 1937, he was made a Knight Grand Cross of the Royal Victorian Order.

Being an opponent of the Nazis, he lost his diplomatic position after the Anschluss of 1938. In order to organize the fight against the Nazis out of Britain and help anti-Nazi countrymen, he remained in London, took British nationality on 14 July 1938, and was knighted on 26 July 1938 by King George VI, becoming Sir George Franckenstein.

Together with his brother Clemens, his cousins Joseph von Franckenstein, an active intelligence and field agent at the OSS, and Heinrich von Franckenstein, he tried to keep up an active network and opposition against the Nazi-Regime out of London. Unlike networks of some occupied countries, this activity was not successful, as the majority of Austrians at the time identified themselves as German.

== Personal life ==
On 31 July 1939, he married Englishwoman Editha King (1916–1953). Together, they were the parents of:

- Clement von Franckenstein (1944–2019), an actor who never married.

Franckenstein and his wife were among forty-four people killed in a plane crash in Kelsterbach, Hessen, outside Frankfurt on 14 October 1953. Their son was then raised by family friends.
