= 1953 Sabena Convair CV-240 crash =

1953 plane crash in Germany

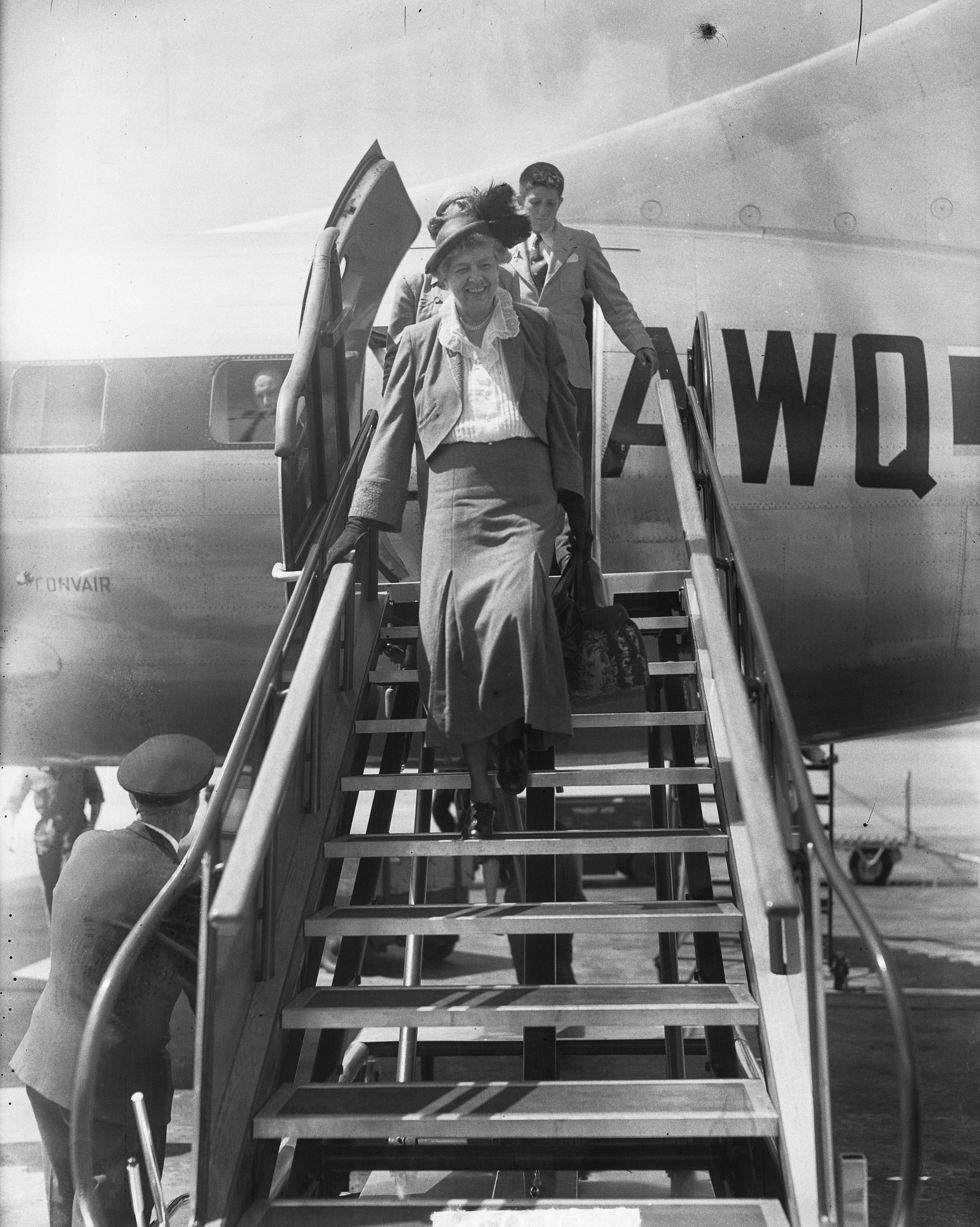
- The aft section of the aircraft involved in the accident

Accident
- Date: 14 October 1953
- Summary: Loss of engine power on takeoff, loss of control
- Site: 3 km north of Frankfurt

Aircraft
- Aircraft type: Convair CV-240-12
- Operator: Sabena
- Registration: OO-AWQ
- Flight origin: Salzburg Airport, Austria
- Stopover: Frankfurt International Airport, West Germany
- Destination: Brussel-Zaventem Airport, Belgium
- Occupants: 44
- Passengers: 40
- Crew: 4
- Fatalities: 44
- Survivors: 0

On 14 October 1953, a Sabena Convair CV-240 crashed 3 kilometres (1.9 mi) north of Frankfurt, West Germany, shortly after taking off from Frankfurt International Airport. All 44 occupants on board the aircraft were killed.

== Aircraft ==
The Convair CV-240-12 involved was built in 1949 with serial number 154 and registration OO-AWQ and was used by the Belgian airline company Sabena from 1 April 1949 until its destruction in 1953.

== Crash ==
After having arrived from Salzburg Airport for her stopover, the Sabena flight was scheduled to depart from Frankfurt International Airport bound for Zaventem Airport with 40 passengers and four crew members on board at 15.20 pm on 14 October 1953. However shortly after takeoff, the crew noticed that both engines were losing power. The crew followed the normal procedures and raised the flaps while trying to keep control of their plane. The aircraft ultimately became uncontrollable and stalled, crashing in a wooded area near Kelsterbach about two miles north of the airport she departed from. Firefighters and four ambulances reached the crash scene after following the rising smoke plume but it was quickly discovered that all 44 onboard had perished in the flaming wreckage.

== Victims ==
The victims included Austrian diplomat Georg von und zu Franckenstein and his wife.

== Cause ==
The cause of the crash was determined to possibly be a heavy deposit of lead on the spark plugs in the engines. The investigation states that as the plugs warmed up during takeoff, the metal deposits formed a circuit which ended up short circuiting the plugs causing the fatal engine failure and subsequent stalling and crash of the aircraft. It is unknown whether the pilots actions contributed to the crash or if the fatal outcome was unavoidable.

== Aftermath ==
The aircraft was destroyed by the impact and post-crash fire with only pieces of debris scattered around the wooded area. The crash site was documented on film on 21 October by the German press.
