= Anton Eggstein =

Anton Eggstein (3 March 1780, Burgau - 13 March 1819, Munich) was a German brewer and politician, most notable as a member of the first-ever Landtag of Bavaria.

== Life ==
Eggstein lived and worked as a brewer in his home town of Burgau. He was married, with two sons and a daughter.

The Bavarian Constitution of 1818 set up an elected popular assembly for the Kingdom of Bavaria, known as the Bayerische Ständeversammlung, based in Munich and consisting of a chamber of Imperial Councillors and a chamber of deputies. Eggstein was elected in the very first elections in December, chosen from the fifth class and representing the Upper Danube area (Oberdonaukreis) in the chamber of deputies.

The deputies came to the Landtag's grand opening in Munich on 1 February 1819. The sessions lasted until the end of the parliament on 25 July 1819 and its legislative term as a whole lasted until 1825, with its members usually only in the chamber when summoned and otherwise back in their home towns working on their regular jobs. In 1819, during his first period at the Landstag from 1819, Eggstein had rented a room at the Gasthof Döllerer in the Tal district of Munich. There he suffered an erysipelas on the head and died suddenly in his room on 13 March 1819.

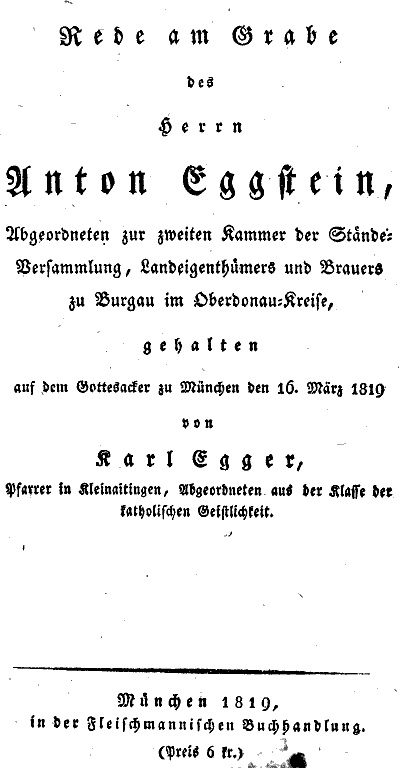
Title page of Egger's eulogy at Eggenstein's funeral

He was the first deputy of the Bavarian Landstag to die in office and was buried with great solemnity on 16 March in the Südlichen Friedhof München after a procession from the Ständehaus to the cemetery by all the members of both chambers of the parliament. The funeral service was a Roman Catholic one, led by a priest from the Munich Frauenkirche and with a eulogy at the graveside by the Landtag's chaplain Pastor Carl Borromäus Egger (1772–1849), a then-popular preacher and writer. Directly behind the coffin walked vice-president count Franz Erwein von Schönborn-Wiesentheid from the counselors' chamber and president Freiherr Sebastian von Schrenck from the chamber of deputies. Eggstein had been in the Burgau militia since 1803, reaching the rank of Hauptmann and so was buried in his uniform and with a company of the Munich militia as funeral escort.

According to his obituary in volume 13 of the proceedings of the Chamber of Deputies of Bavaria, his gravestone read "He was an active householder, an honest brewer, a loyal husband, a righteous father, a pious Catholic Christian, an honourable man concerned for his fatherland's welfare." Due to his sudden death, it also bore Bernard of Clairvaux's saying "Because death awaits you everywhere, expect him everywhere, if you want to be wise".

== Bibliography ==
- Verhandlung der Kammer der Bayerischen Abgeordneten, 1819, Band 13, Nachruf
- Carl Borromäus Egger: Rede am Grabe des Herrn Anton Eggstein, Abgeordneten zur zweiten Kammer der Stände-Versammlung, Landeigenthümers und Brauers zu Burgau im Oberdonau-Kreise: Gehalten auf dem Gottesacker zu München den 16. März 1819, Digital copy
