= Sebastian von Schrenck =

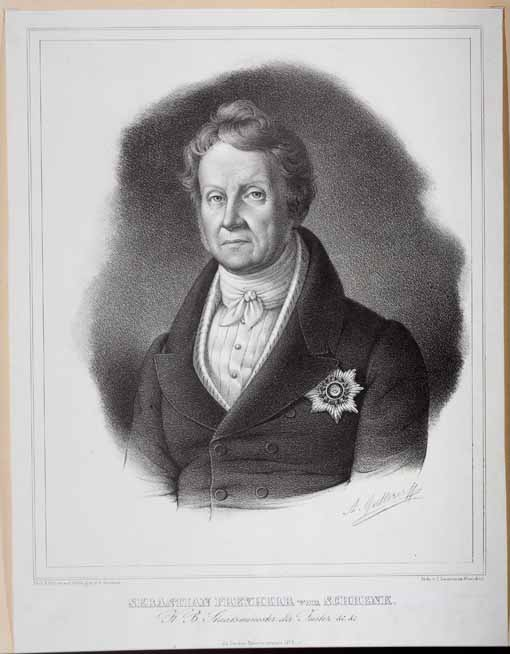

Sebastian Wenzel Freiherr von Schrenck-Notzing (28 September 1774, Hillstett/Oberpfalz - 16 Mary 1848, Munich) was a Roman Catholic Bavarian politician. He was a member of the chamber of deputies in the Landtag of Bavaria in 1819, 1822, 1825, 1827/28, 1831, 1834 and 1837 and served as that chamber's president from 1819 to 1837
