= Schönborn (state) =

County of Schönborn Grafschaft Schönborn
- Status: State of the Holy Roman Empire
- Capital: Wiesentheid
- Government: Principality
- Historical era: Early modern Europe

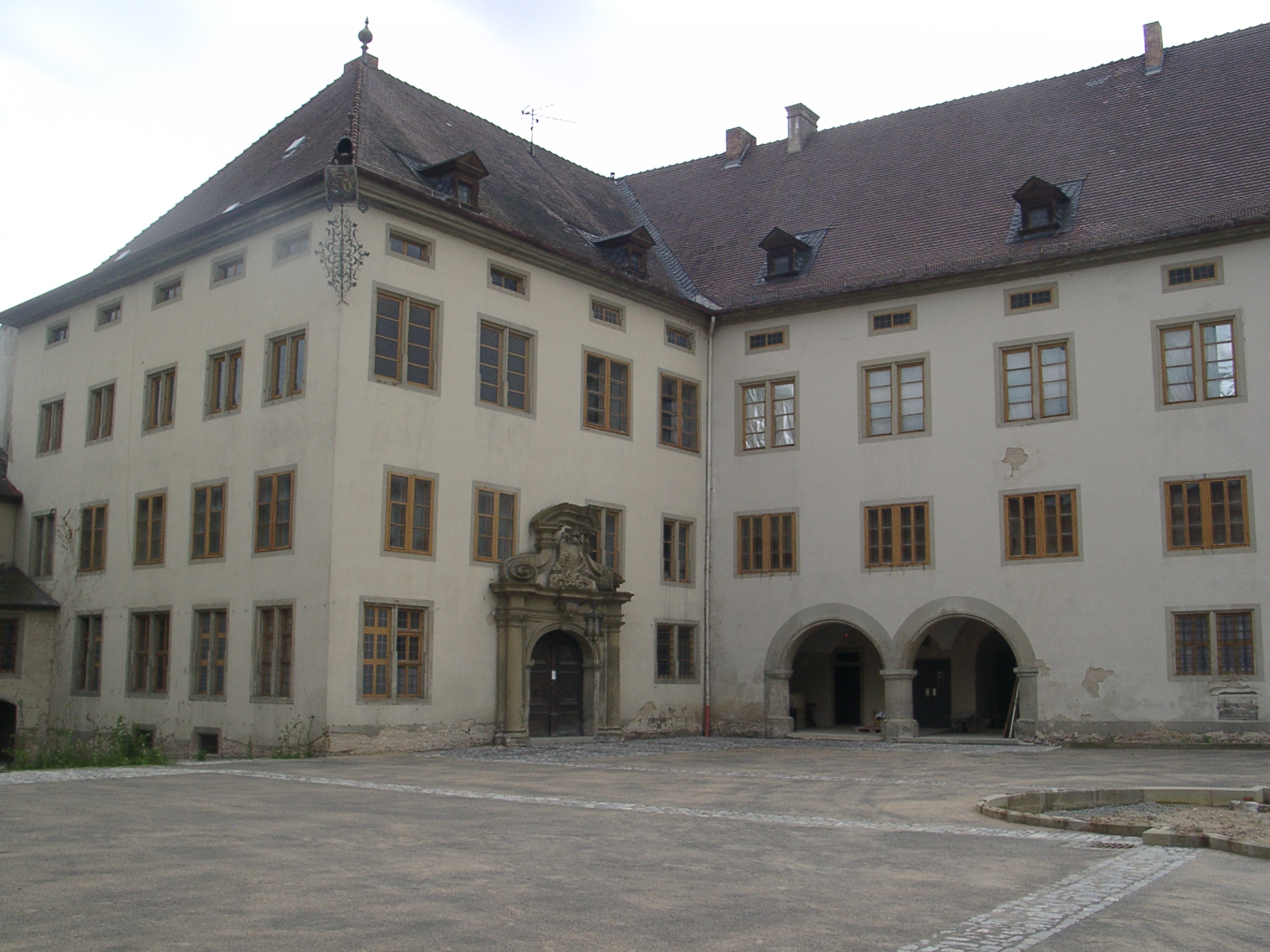
Wiesentheid Castle

The County of Schönborn is a former principality (i.e. Herrschaft) of the Holy Roman Empire that held imperial immediacy and that was ruled by the House of Schönborn.

The state of Schönborn was located to the south of Bamberg and to the southeast of Würzburg.

The Schönborn family, originally from Schönborn, Rhein-Lahn, owned several fiefs in Southern Hesse. In 1661, Philipp Erwein, Baron von Schönborn (1607–1668), of Freienfels Castle near Weinbach, since 1654 also owner of Geisenheim, purchased the Herrschaft (territory) of Heusenstamm and built the new castle. In 1671 his son Melchior Friedrich (1644–1717) acquired the fief of Reichelsburg and in 1701 inherited the Herrschaft Wiesentheid which was a small Imperial State and raised to a County in 1701. In 1717, his estate was partitioned into the state of Schönborn-Wiesentheid and the territory of Schönborn-Heusenstamm.

The state of Schönborn-Wiesentheid was mediatised in 1806; the House of Schönborn thus retained a partial sovereignty as well as sovereign rank. The Counts of Schönborn-Wiesentheid are still today residing at Wiesentheid Castle.
