= Wiesentheid Castle =

Castle in Wiesentheid, Bavaria, Germany

Coordinates: 49.7948°N 10.3428°E

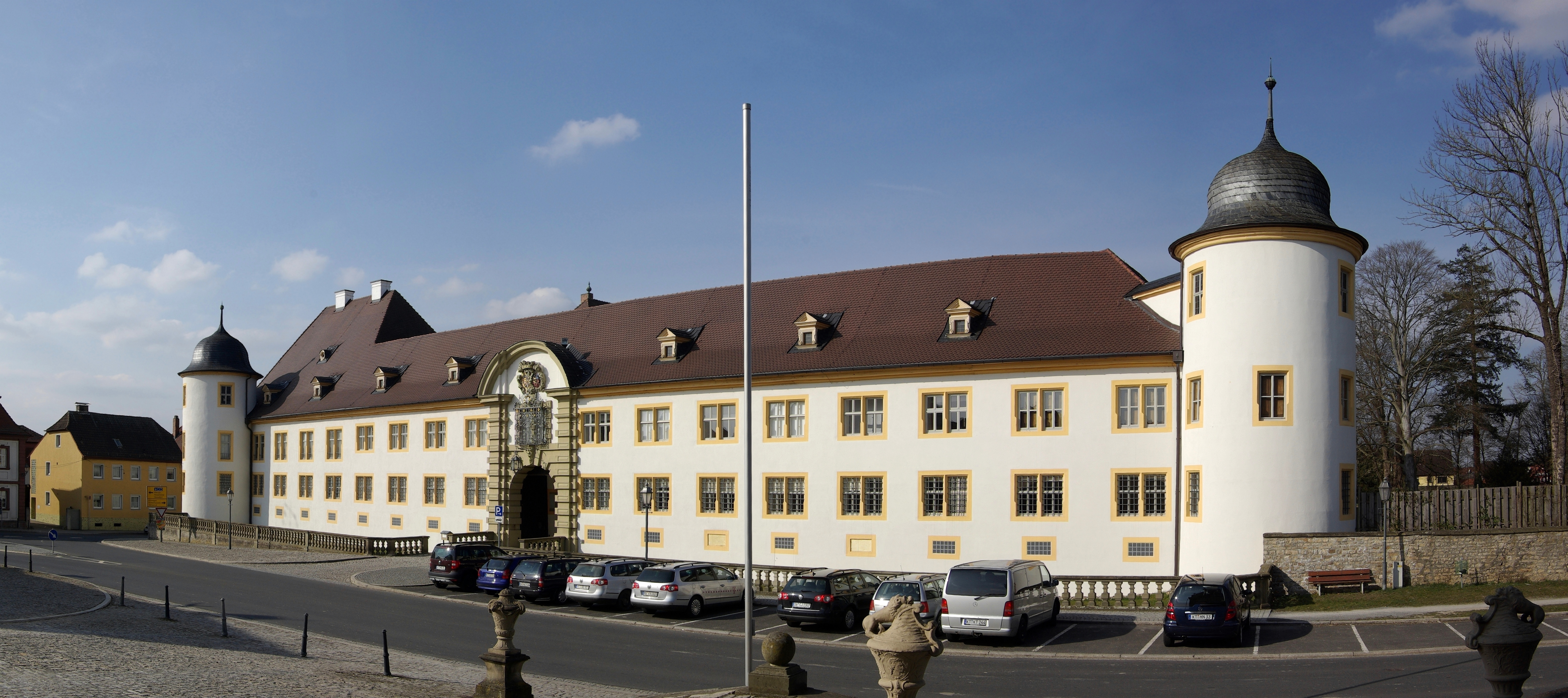
Eastern wing of the castle

Wiesentheid Castle (German: Schloss Wiesentheid) is a listed building in the market town of Wiesentheid, Kitzingen, in Lower Franconia, Bavaria, Germany. The complex includes the Baroque town centre with the parish church and the eponymous castle of the Counts of Schönborn.

== History ==
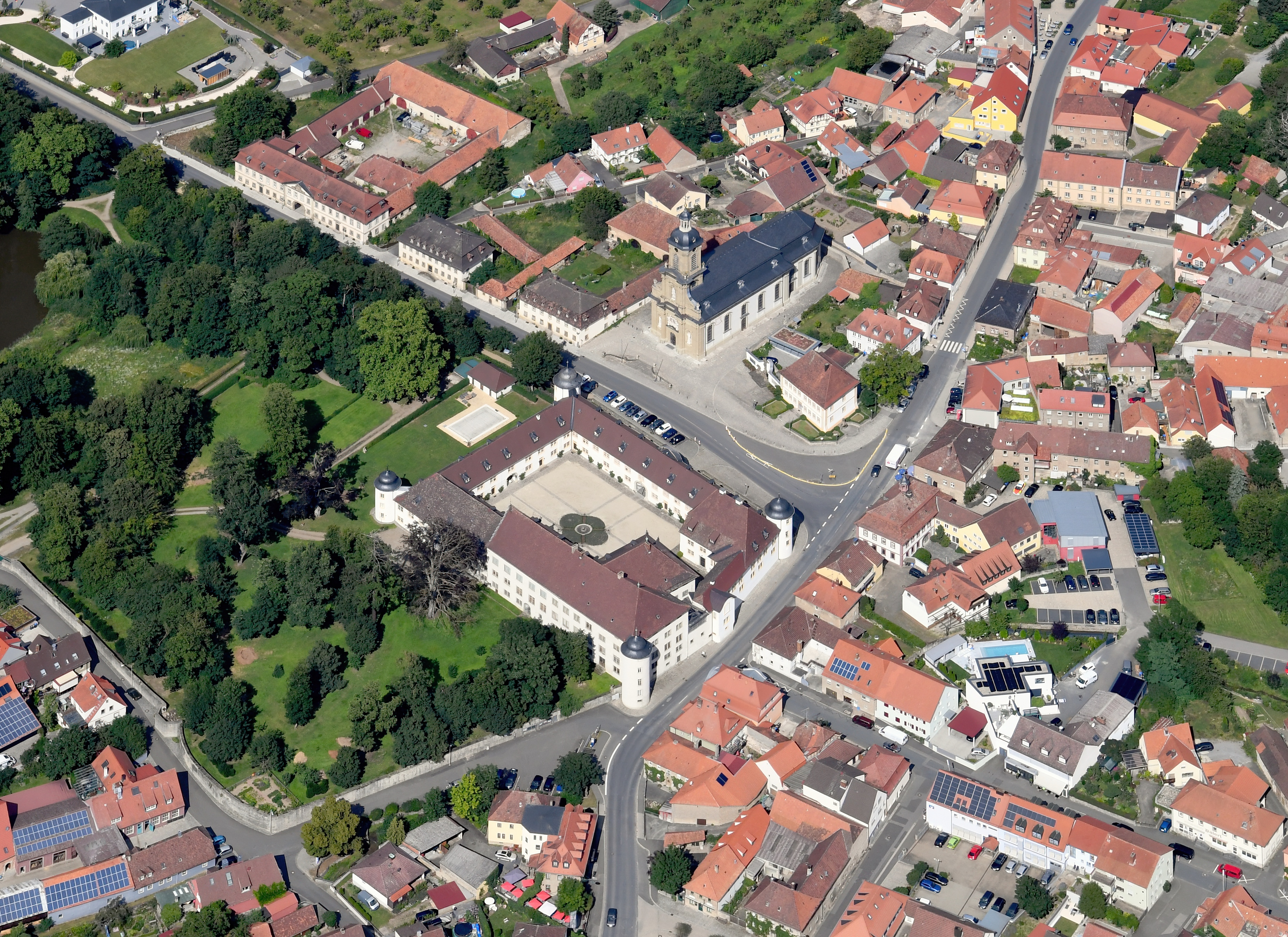
Aerial image of the Wiesentheid Castle complex

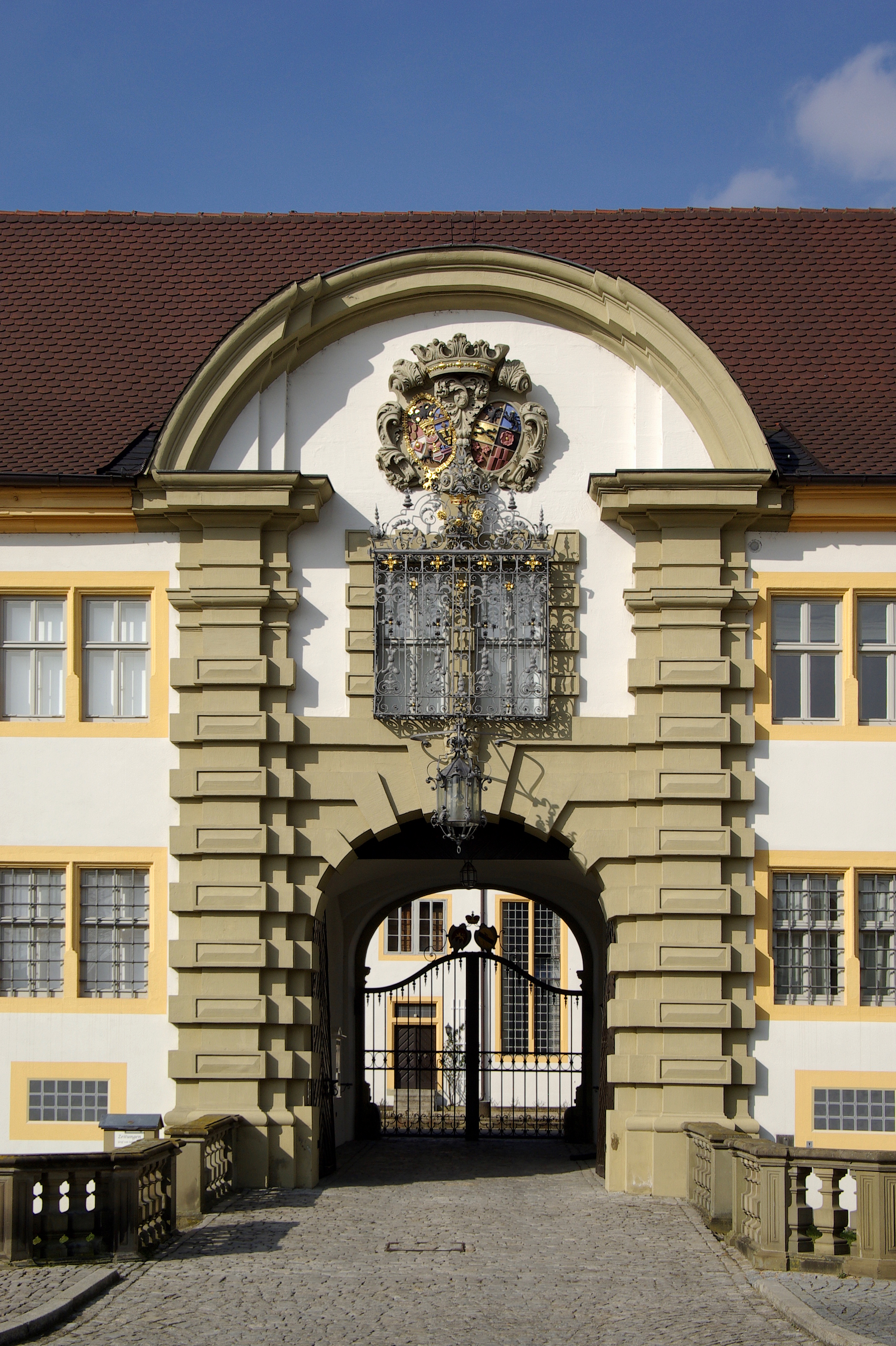
Entrance to the castle

Wiesentheid Castle's history begins in the late Middle Ages. At that time, the Counts of Castell owned the moated castle in the town. After the Counts got increasingly into debt in the 16th century, Count Conrad II of Castell (who ruled alongside his brothers, Frederick XI and Henry IV) had to sell the castle in 1547 to Valentin Fuchs von Dornheim.

=== Fuchs von Dornehim family ===
After acquiring the castle in 1547, Valentin Fuchs von Dornheim soon made it his primary residence. Valentin's successor, Hans Fuchs von Dornheim, had a new castle built in 1576. The so-called "Fuchs Building" was built in the southwest of the current complex. The Fuchs family continued to live in the castle until the death of the last family member, Georg Adolf Fuchs von Dornheim, in 1673, after which his widow, Anna Maria Fuchs von Dornheim (née Voit von Rieneck), inherited the property.

=== Dernbach family ===
Anna Maria Fuchs von Dornheim remarried in 1678, at which time the castle passed to her new husband, Johann Otto von Dernbach (1658–1697). (Note: Anna Maria Voit von Rieneck died childless in 1690. Johann Otto von Dernbach (1658–1697) then married Countess Maria Catharina von Lengheim, with whom he had two children, neither of whom reached adulthood. After the death of his second wife in 1695, von Lengheim married Maria Eleonore Charlotta von Hatzfeld (1680–1718) in the same year.) He promoted his new residence and granted Wiesentheid the right to hold a market in 1682. At the same time, the Wiesentheid possessions were removed from the Imperial Knighthood of the Lords of Dernbach and transformed into an Imperial direct rule. Wiesentheid thus received its own seat and a vote in the Franconian Counts College (German: Fränkische Grafenkolleg). After the death of von Dernbach in 1697, the castle again passed to the widow of the deceased, Maria Eleonore von Dernbach (née von Hatzfeld).

=== Schönborn-Wiesentheid family ===
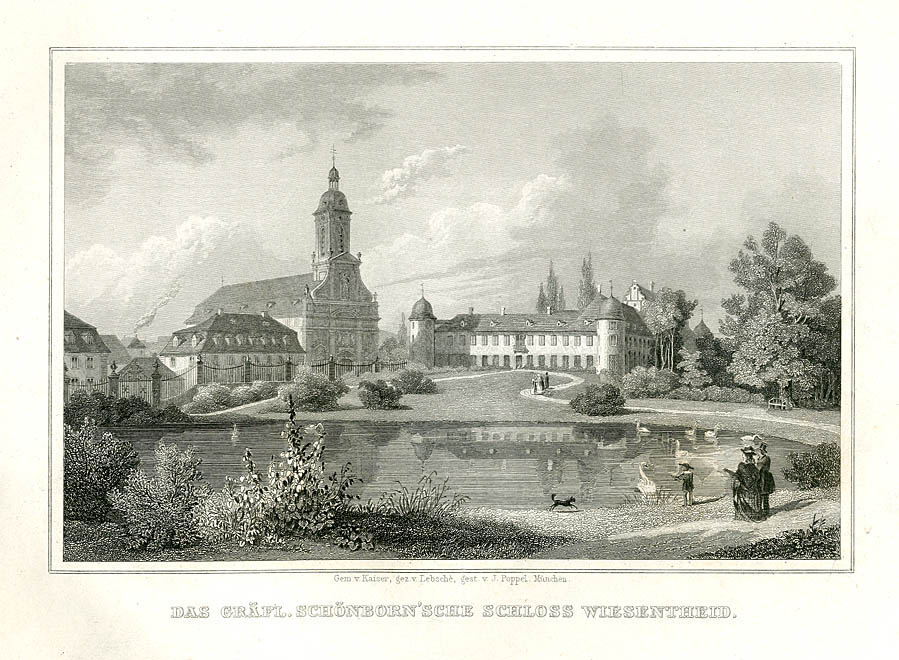
Castle and church in Wiesentheid, steel engraving c. 1879, by Johann Poppel

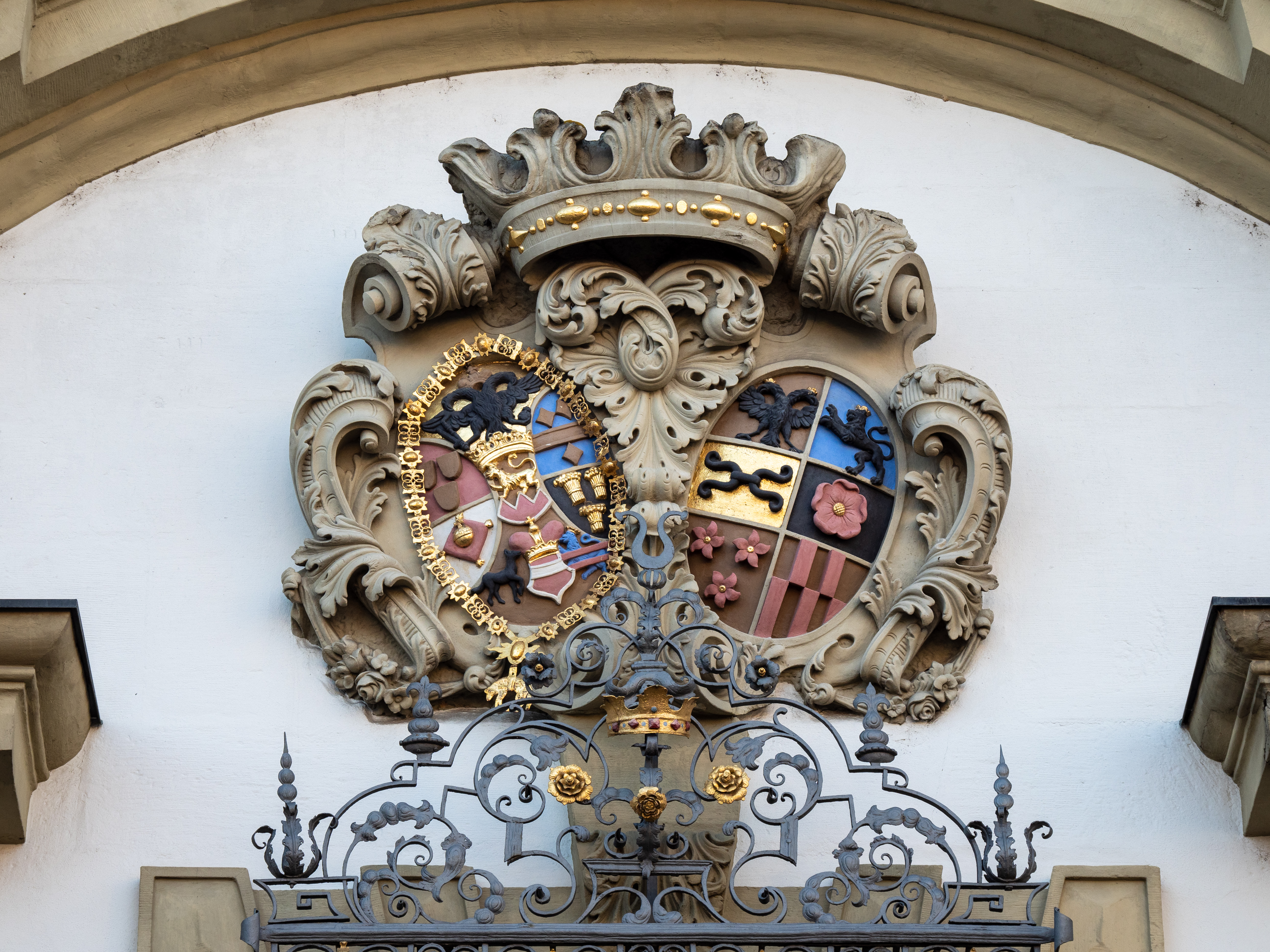
The Coat of Arms of the Counts of Wiesentheid's above the castle entrance

In 1701, Maria Eleonore von Dernbach married her cousin Rudolf Franz Erwein von Schönborn and the estate passed into the von Schönborn family. Rudolf Franz Erwein von Schönborn, who took over control in 1704, built the castle in its current form and converted it into the new residence of the Counts. In addition to being a diplomat, he was an accomplished composer and amateur cellist.

From 1711 to 1720, the castle was rebuilt under the direction of the Jesuit priest Nikolaus Loyson (1676–1720), who also remodeled another of the Schönborn family's estate, Schloss Weißenstein. Count Rudolf Franz Erwein von Schönborn also hired well-known stucco artists Johann Jakob Vogel, Caspar Vogel and Blasius Straub worked on the construction. He commissioned cabinet maker, Johann Georg Neßtfell, to make furniture for the castle. In addition, a baroque garden was created next to the castle, which was described as one of the most beautiful in Franconia. The park was converted into an English landscape garden in 1841.

On 3 September 1806, the Wiesentheid lordship was dissolved and its territory was annexed to the Kingdom of Bavaria. From then on, the Counts of Schönborn were only lords of the estate, but retained some of their former rights, such as lower jurisdiction, until 1848. In 1846, the castle hill between the castle and the church was demolished. Today, the castle is still inhabited by the Counts of Schönborn. The park is largely open to the public.

The castle is now classified as an architectural monument by the Bavarian State Office for Monument Protection. In addition, the underground remains of the previous buildings are listed as archaeological monuments.

== See also ==
- Schönborn family
