= Philipp Valentin Albrecht Voit von Rieneck =

- Prince-Bishop of Bamberg
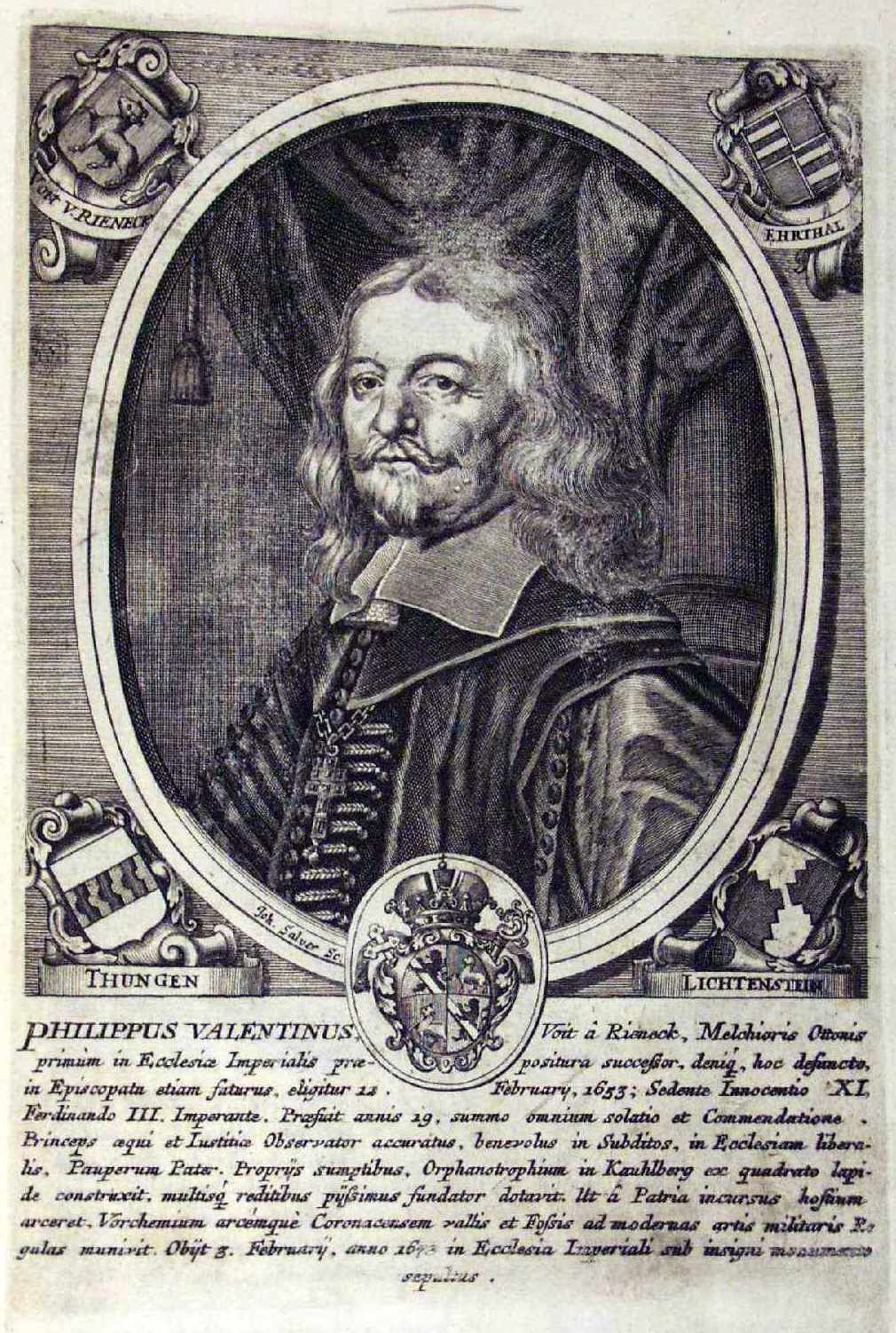
- Engraving of Philipp Valentin Albrecht Voit von Rieneck by Johann Salver
- Church: Catholic Church
- Diocese: Diocese of Bamberg
- In office: 14 January 1658 – 3 February 1672
- Predecessor: Melchior Otto Voit von Salzburg
- Successor: Peter Philipp von Dernbach

Orders
- Consecration: 17 July 1661 by Johann Melchior Söllner

Personal details
- Born: 10 January 1612 Rodenbach (in present-day Lohr am Main), Electorate of Mainz, Electoral Rhenish Circle, Holy Roman Empire
- Died: 3 February 1672 (aged 60) Bamberg, Prince-Bishopric of Bamberg, Franconian Circle, Holy Roman Empire

Philipp Valentin Albrecht Voit von Rieneck (10 January 1612 – 3 February 1672) was the Prince-Bishop of Bamberg from 1653 to 1672.

== Biography ==
Philipp Valentin Albrecht Voit von Rieneck was born in Rodenbach, today a part of Lohr, on 10 January 1612.

He was appointed Prince-Bishop of Bamberg on 13 February 1653 but this appointment was not confirmed by Pope Alexander VII until 14 January 1658. He was consecrated as a bishop in 1661.

He died in Bamberg on 3 February 1672.

Catholic Church titles
Preceded by Melchior Otto von Voit von Salzburg	Prince-Bishop of Bamberg; 1653–1672	Succeeded by Peter Philipp von Dernbach
