= List of ambassadors of Austria to the United Kingdom =

Ambassadors of Austria to the United Kingdom

Ambassador of the Republic of Austria to the United Kingdom
- Coat of arms of Austria
- Incumbent; Bernhard Wrabetz since 2023
- Ministry of Foreign Affairs; Embassy of Austria, London
- Style: His Excellency
- Inaugural holder: Georg von und zu Franckenstein
- Formation: 1920
- Website: Austrian Embassy, London

The Ambassador of the Republic of Austria to the United Kingdom is the Republic of Austria's foremost diplomatic representative in the United Kingdom. As head of Austria's diplomatic mission there, the ambassador is the official representative of the president and government of Austria to the Prime Minister and the government of the United Kingdom. The position has the rank and status of an Ambassador Extraordinary and Minister Plenipotentiary and the embassy is located in London.

== History ==
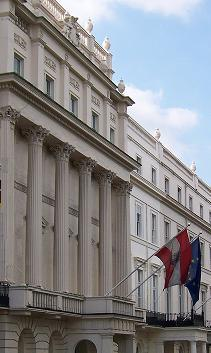
Embassy of Austria, London, 2007

Since 1677 there has been an Austrian legation in London, which was upgraded to an embassy in 1860. Since 1866, the Austrian ambassador at the Court of St. James has been 18, Belgrave Square.

== Ambassadors of the Republic of Austria ==
- 1920–1938: Georg von und zu Franckenstein
- 1946–1950: Heinrich Schmid
- 1952–1955: Lothar Wimmer
- 1955–1966: Johannes, Prince of Schwarzenberg
- 1966–1970: Josef Schöner
- 1970–1975: Wilfried Platzer
- 1975–1978: Kurt Enderl
- 1979–1982: Heinrich Gleissner
- 1982–1987: Reginald Thomas
- 1987–1993: Walter Magrutsch
- 1993–1996: Georg Hennig
- 1997–2000: Eva Nowotny
- 2000–2003: Alexander Christiani
- 2004–2005: Ernst Sucharipa
- 2005–2010: Gabriele Matzner-Holzer
- 2010–2015: Emil Brix
- 2015–2018: Martin Eichtinger
- 2018–2023: Michael Zimmermann
- 2023–present: Bernhard Wrabetz

== Ambassadors of Austria-Hungary ==
Prior to the formation of the Republic of Austria, the Habsburg Monarchy, Austrian Empire, Austria-Hungary, also sent diplomatic representatives to the Court of St James's in London.

== See also ==
- Austria–United Kingdom relations
- United Kingdom Ambassador to Austria
- Foreign relations of Austria
