= Detlof von Winterfeldt =

German diplomat (1867–1940)

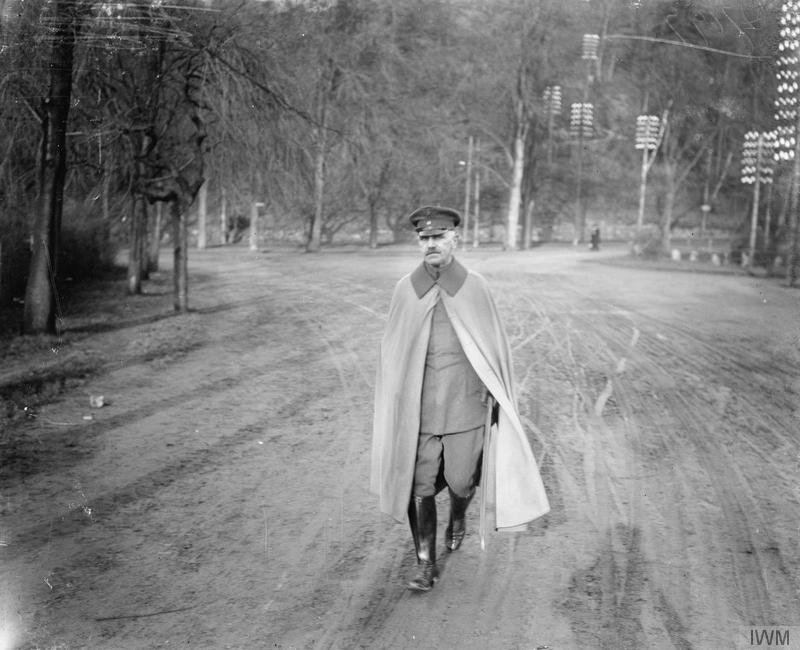
- Winterfeldt at the armistice conference in Spa, 29 November 1918
- Born: 28 May 1867; Berlin, Prussia
- Died: 3 July 1940 (aged 73); Berlin, Prussia, Nazi Germany
- Military career
- Allegiance: German Empire (to 1918); Weimar Republic (to 1919)
- Rank: Generalmajor
- Unit: 8th Army

Detlof Sigismund von Winterfeldt (28 May 1867 – 29 November 1940) was a German officer and military attaché who represented the German Army as a signatory of the Armistice of 11 November 1918, which concluded the hostilities of World War I.

== Biography ==
Winterfeldt was born in Berlin and received his commission as an officer in 1888 after attending the Prussian Staff College. Between 1901 and 1905, he served as military attaché in Brussels, and later served the same role in Paris between 1909 and 1914.

After the outbreak of World War I, Winterfeldt left Paris in August 1914 to serve as quartermaster to the 8th Army, with the rank of Oberst. From August 1917 to November 1918, he was representative of the Supreme Army Command to the Chancellor, with the rank of Generalmajor.

In November 1918, Winterfeldt was a delegate to the armistice negotiations between Germany and the Allied Powers, led by Matthias Erzberger, minister without portfolio. With him, Alfred von Oberndorff of the Foreign Ministry, and Captain Vanselow of the navy, Winterfeldt was one of the four German signatories to the Armistice of 11 November 1918, which ended the hostilities of the war.

Winterfeldt died in Berlin in 1940 and is buried at the Invalids' Cemetery.
