= Joseph Freiherr von Franckenstein =

Austro-German Nazi opponent and philologist

Joseph von Franckenstein
- Born: Joseph Maria Casimir Konrad Michael Benedictus Maurus Placidus Freiherr von und zu Franckenstein; 30 September 1910; Traunegg Castle, Austrian Empire
- Died: 7 October 1963 (aged 53) San Francisco, United States
- Allegiance: Republic of Austria; United States
- Branch: United States Army; Special operations force; Office of Strategic Services
- Years: 1941–1945
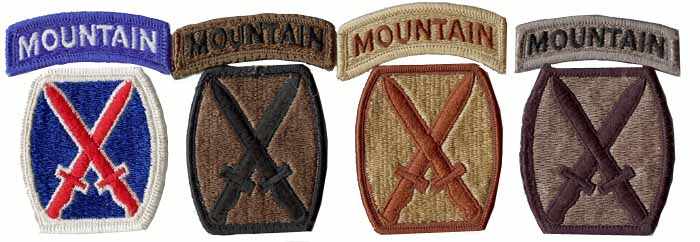
- Rank: First lieutenant
- Battles: World War II; Aleutian Islands campaign; Western Front (World War II); Austrian resistance
- Spouse: Kay Boyle (m. 1943)

Joseph Maria Casimir Konrad Michael Benedictus Maurus Placidus, Freiherr von und zu Franckenstein (30 September 1910 - 7 October 1963) was an Austro-German philologist, dissident and later US Army Lieutenant attached to the OSS (Office of Strategic Services) and to the Austrian 'O5' resistance movement against the Nazi Regime.

== Early life ==
Franckenstein was born on 30 September 1910 at Traunegg Castle in Thalheim bei Wels. He was the son of Konrad von und zu Franckenstein (1875-1938), a descendant of the Habsburgs, and Anna Maria Countess of Esterhazy-Galantha (1886-1968). He was the grandson of the landowner and Lord of Traunegg, Heinrich Maria Friedrich Karl, Freiherr von und zu Franckenstein, and Helene, Countess of Arco-Zinneberg.

He attended the University of St Andrews in Scotland from 1933 to 1934, earning an M.A., and was Master of Language at Eton in 1935.

== Career ==
After studying classical philology and completing his doctorate at the University of Innsbruck, he worked as an occasional journalist and mountaineer in Austria during difficult economic times and political turmoil in the 1930s. He campaigned throughout the Tyrol region against the Nazis' growing influence in the years leading up to the "Anschluss" in 1938, shortly before which he fled the country. His elder brother Heinrich, who had already left Germany in 1934 and had emigrated to Turkey, as well as his cousin Georg von Franckenstein advised him not to return.

Franckenstein settled in Megève, France, in the Alps, where he taught at the College Florimontane until 1941.

=== World War II ===
During World War II, Franckenstein volunteered for the U.S. Army the day after Pearl Harbor. He served in the 87th Mountain Regiment, Company I, becoming a U.S. citizen, and later served in the 10th Mountain Division. He participated in the Aleutian Campaign in the summer and fall of 1943. In 1944 he was appointed to the OSS and was an espionage agent in Austria in support of the Austrian Resistance against the Nazis, working with the Tyrolean group under the leadership of Dr. Karl Gruber. He infiltrated the country in the uniform of a German Wehrmacht sergeant of the Reichssicherheitshauptamt. In late April 1945, after being arrested by the Gestapo, imprisoned at Reichenau, tortured and sentenced to death, he was able to escape and assist in the liberation of Innsbruck by the Americans in May 1945. He stayed until November 1945, assisting with denazification efforts and the setting up of Austrian schools and courts.

=== Post World War II ===
After a brief period in the U.S. with his wife and children, he returned to Germany in 1946 as a press officer of the military government, while Kay Boyle had the task of writing stories from Germany as a foreign correspondent for The New Yorker. They lived in Marburg, Hesse, then Frankfurt am Main, where Franckenstein was the news editor for Die Neue Zeitung, a German-language newspaper overseen by the U.S. State Department that helped bring a free press to postwar Germany. In October 1952, as part of the communist hunt of US Senator Joseph McCarthy, Franckenstein was interrogated by a hearing board on questions of loyalty and security. The charges remained vague, but they included Kay Boyle's supposed affiliations with Communist groups and Franckenstein's brief time in 1942 working at a summer camp believed to be a front for a Communist organization, as well as an anonymous claim from a co-worker that he was "100 percent pro-Soviet." Although cleared of all suspicion, he was fired from the State Department as a "security risk" shortly thereafter and Kay Boyle's accreditation was revoked by the New Yorker.

After their return to the US, Boyle and Franckenstein fought the charges against them and struggled to find work until Franckenstein found a position teaching at the Thomas School for Girls in Rowayton. In 1956, Franckenstein and Boyle appeared in front of the U.S. Senate Subcommittee on Constitutional Rights to protest being branded as security risks. The following year, the State Department officially cleared Franckenstein of all charges but did not reinstate him until 1962, when he became Cultural attaché in Tehran. His return to diplomatic service was short lived. He fell ill and was operated in Germany in July 1963, when he was diagnosed with cancer, already at an advanced stage, returning to the United States.

== Personal life ==
In autumn 1940, he had met and fallen in love with the American writer Kay Boyle, also living in Megève, whose children he taught as a tutor. She helped Franckenstein escape from France in the summer of 1941. After the divorce from her second husband, Franckenstein married Kay Boyle in 1943. They had two children:

- Faith Carson Franckenstein Gude (b. 1942)
- Ian Savin Franckenstein (1943-2024).

Baron von Franckenstein died on 7 October in San Francisco, California. He was buried in Golden Gate National Cemetery with military honors.

== Estate ==
- Kay Boyle and Joseph Franckenstein correspondence, 1940-1963ID: 1/1/MSS 184Repository: Special Collections, Morris Library, Southern Illinois University.

== Literature ==
- Georg Albert von und zu Franckenstein: Between Vienna and London. Memories of an Austrian diplomat. Leopold Stocker Publishers, Graz 2005, ISBN 3-7020-1092-0.
- Lives Out of Letters: Essays on American Literary Biography and Documentation in Honor of Robert N. Hudspeth, by Robert D. Habich and Robert N. Hudspeth (2004), ISBN 9780838640050
- Exploding Star: A Young Austrian Against Hitler, by Fritz Molden (1978).
- The Two Worlds of William March, by Roy S. Simmonds (2011), ISBN 9780817356873
- Kay Boyle" A Twentieth-Century Life in Letters (English Edition) Ed. by Sandra Spanier (2015), ISBN 9780252097362
