= Alfred von Oberndorff =

German diplomat (1870–1963)

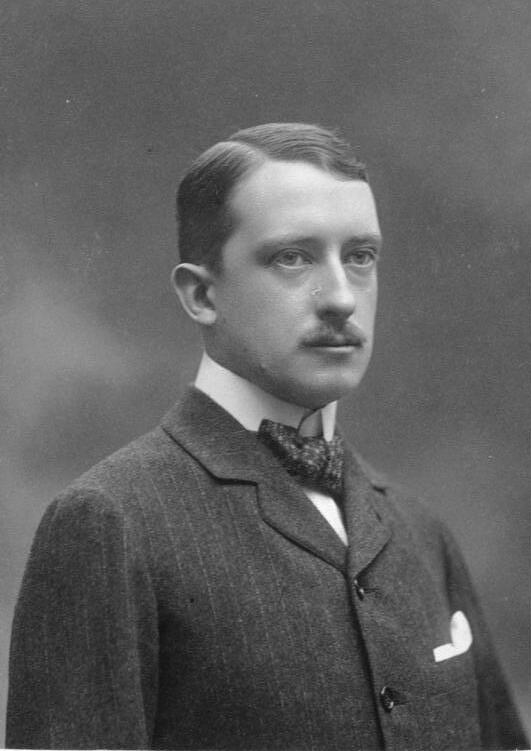
Oberndorff

Alfred Maria Fortunatus Franziskus Caesar von Oberndorff (9 December 1870 – 16 March 1963), also Count Oberndorff, was a German diplomat.

He headed missions in Norway and Bulgaria and in 1918 was one of the signatories of the Armistice that ended the fighting of the First World War.

== Early life ==
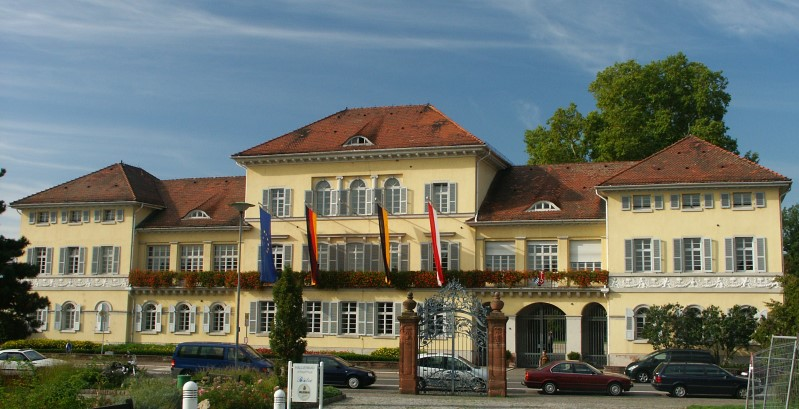
Schloss Neckarhausen

Oberndorff was born in Edingen-Neckarhausen, in the Grand Duchy of Baden, the son of Carl Gustav Adolph Maria Fortunatus Philipp Gabriel von Oberndorff, a landowner and count of the Holy Roman Empire, and his wife Marie Therese Henriette Franziska Eleonora Charlotte von Varicourt-Albini. His father was a chamberlain at the Imperial and Royal Habsburg court in Vienna.

The young Oberndorff was educated in law at Heidelberg University, the Friedrich Wilhelm University of Berlin, the Ludwig-Maximilians-Universität München, and the University of Freiburg. He passed the first state law examination in the spring of 1892 and graduated Doctor Iuris at Heidelberg University on 9 August 1892. He entered into pupillage at the district court in Heidelberg, working also at the courts in Wiesloch and Pforzheim, and passed the second state law examination in the spring of 1895.

== Career ==
In December 1895, Oberndorff was admitted to the Imperial foreign service, and after a period of training joined the active diplomatic service of the German Empire in February 1897.

In 1900, Oberndorff was appointed as second secretary at the German embassy in Madrid and in 1904 held the same position at the embassy to the Court of St James's. In 1905 he was posted as first secretary in Brussels and in 1907 returned to Madrid, with the rank of Counsellor. In 1910, he was posted to Vienna. Two years later, he got his first posting as a head of mission, serving from 1912 to 1916 as Envoy Extraordinary and Minister Plenipotentiary at the Royal Norwegian Court in Kristiania, where he was when the First World War broke out. From 1916 to 1918 he headed the German mission in Sofia, Bulgaria, a significant promotion, as Bulgaria was one of the Central Powers and a German war ally.

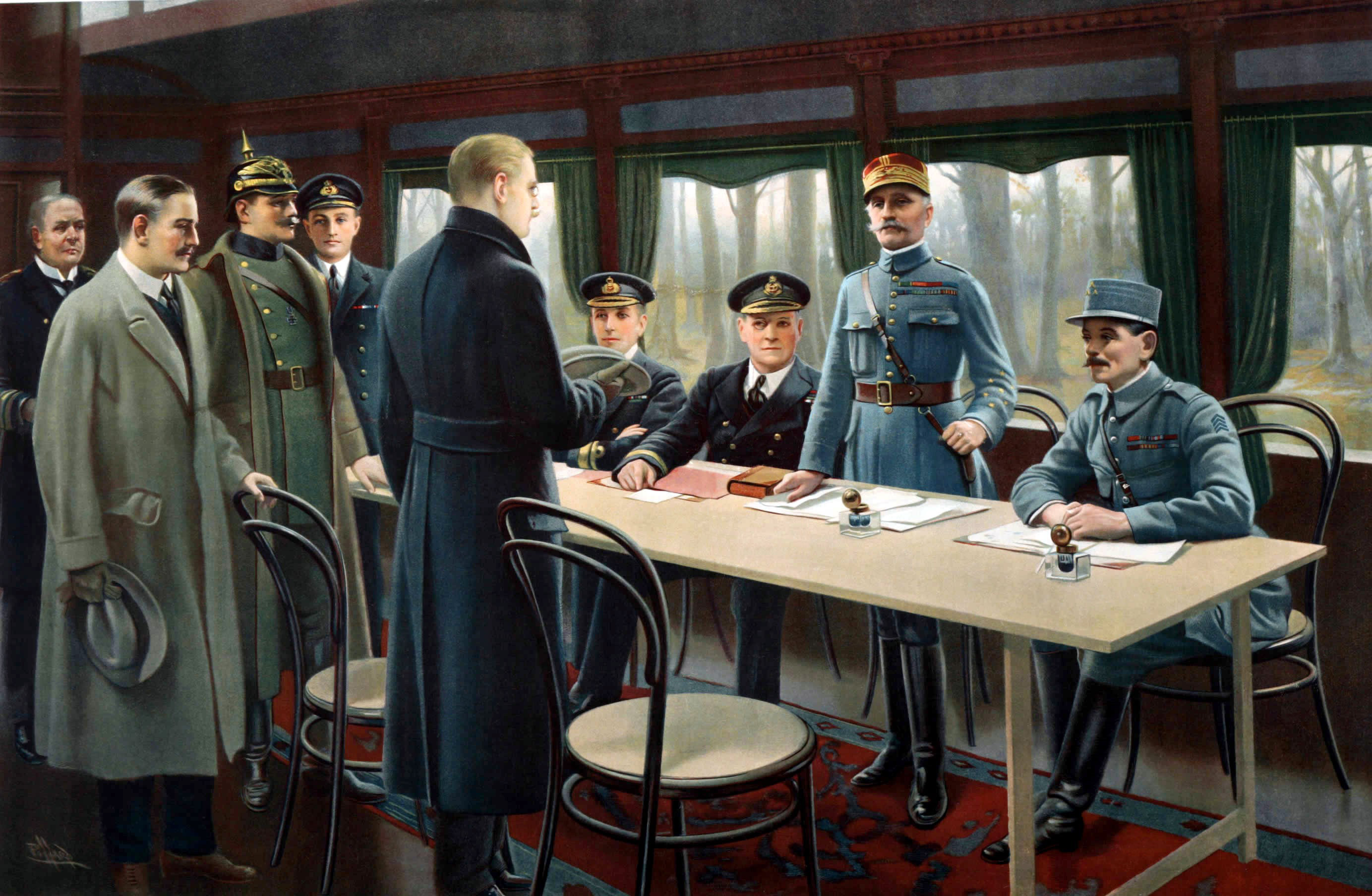
Oberndorff, second from left, after the signing of the Armistice of 11 November 1918

Oberndorff next returned to the Foreign Ministry in Berlin as head of foreign policy. In that capacity, he attended the negotiations for the Armistice of Compiègne, with Matthias Erzberger, who was minister without portfolio, Major General Detlof von Winterfeldt, representative of the Supreme Army Command to the Chancellor of Germany, Captain Ernst Vanselow, of the Imperial German Navy, and two translators. On 11 November 1918, the four men were the German signatories to the Armistice.

In 1920 and 1921 Oberndorff was the first German chargé d'affaires in Warsaw after the Second Polish Republic had emerged as an independent state from the ruins of the Russian Empire. He was recalled to Berlin in February 1921.

Oberndorff was a founding member of the Franco-German Study Commission, which in the 1920s advocated rapprochement between Germany and France. He continued to serve in the foreign ministry of the Weimar Republic and remained there for a few months after the rise to power of Adolf Hitler. He retired in July 1933, after the Enabling Act of 1933 and the Night of the Long Knives.

Oberndorff died in Heidelberg in March 1963 and is buried in the family plot in Neckarhausen.

== Personal life and descendants ==
On 2 January 1904, in Paris, Oberndorff married Marguerite de Stuers, daughter of Alphonse Lambert de Stuers, the Dutch ambassador to France, and of his former wife Margaret Laura Carey, originally of New York City, a granddaughter of William Backhouse Astor Sr. After a divorce from Stuers, she married secondly Elliott Zborowski, was the mother of Louis Zborowski, and owned the Higham Park estate in England.

The Oberndorffs had three children, Maria Teresa (born 1904 in London), Karl Alfons (born 1906 in Brussels), and Elisabeth von Oberndorff (born 1917 in Munich). Soon after the armistice of 1918, Countess Oberndorff took her children to Switzerland and then to Holland. She had inherited valuable commercial property in New York and challenged its seizure by the Office of the Alien Property Custodian.

Oberndorff's son used the name Charles-Alphonse von Oberndorff and in 1928 married Jacqueline de Sauvan d'Aramon, a daughter of the Comte d'Aramon and his English wife Henrietta Bennet Bell. He was a painter and lived at Domaine d'Orio, Hendaye, France. They had five daughters and a son, Johannes Maria Frederik Fortunatus von Oberndorff, born in 1943. Their daughter Liduina Maria Fortunata (born 1933) married Sir Peter Petrie, 5th Baronet, a British diplomat. Charles-Alphonse von Oberndorff died in 1998 at The Hague.

Rita Marie Louise Jacqueline Charlotte Fortunata von Oberndorff (born 1930), one of the daughters of Oberndorff's son Charles-Alphonse, in 1955 married firstly Raja Narendra Singh Ju Deo, son of H. H. Raja Mahipal Singh Ju Deo, 7th Raja of Sarila, at Dehradun, and secondly in 1975 Michel Labéguerie, a Basque nationalist politician and singer. Following the death of her second husband, she succeeded him as Mayor of Cambo-les-Bains between 1980 and 1989 and was also President of the French Red Cross, living until 2017.
