= Schloss Gaibach =

Castle in Volkach, Bavaria, Germany

Coordinates: 49.8912°N 10.2268°E

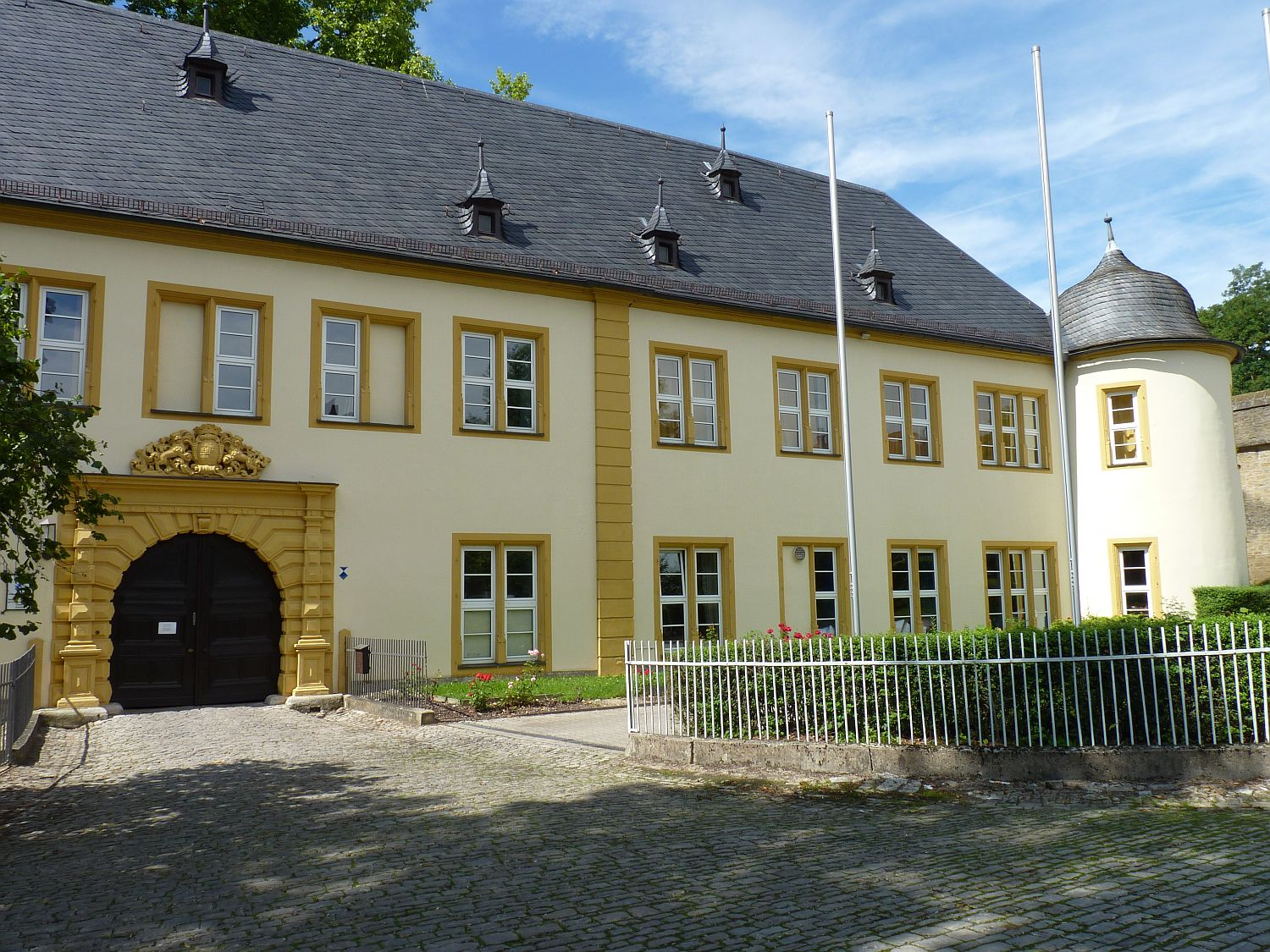
Schloss Gaibach

Schloss Gaibach (full title: Gräflich Schönborn’sches Schloss Gaibach or Comital Schönborn Castle at Gaibach) is a castle in Gaibach, a district of the town of Volkach in Germany. Previously the residence of the counts of Schönborn, it now houses the Franken-Landschulheim Schloss Gaibach.

== Bibliography ==
- Georg Dehio: Handbuch der deutschen Kunstdenkmäler. Bayern I: Franken. München und Berlin: Deutscher Kunstverlag 1999.
- Gerhard Egert: Gaibach- Ein Abriss seiner Ortsgeschichte bis 1806. In: Ute Feuerbach (ed.): Unsere Mainschleife. 1978-1992. Volkach 2008.
- Victor Metzner: Kurzer Abriss der Geschichte des Franken-Landschulheims Schloss Gaibach. In: Ute Feuerbach (ed.): Volkach 906-2006. Volkach 2006.
- Walter Schilling: Die Burgen, Schlösser und Herrensitze Unterfrankens. Würzburg 2012.
- Karl Treutwein: Von Abtswind bis Zeilitzheim. Geschichtliches, Sehenswertes, Überlieferungen. Volkach 1987.
- Georg Wehner: Barockgärten in unserer Heimat: Gaibach, Werneck, Wiesentheid, Volkach und Fahr. In: Ute Feuerbach (ed.): Unsere Mainschleife. 1993-2007. Volkach 2008.
