= Wiesentheid =

- Municipality
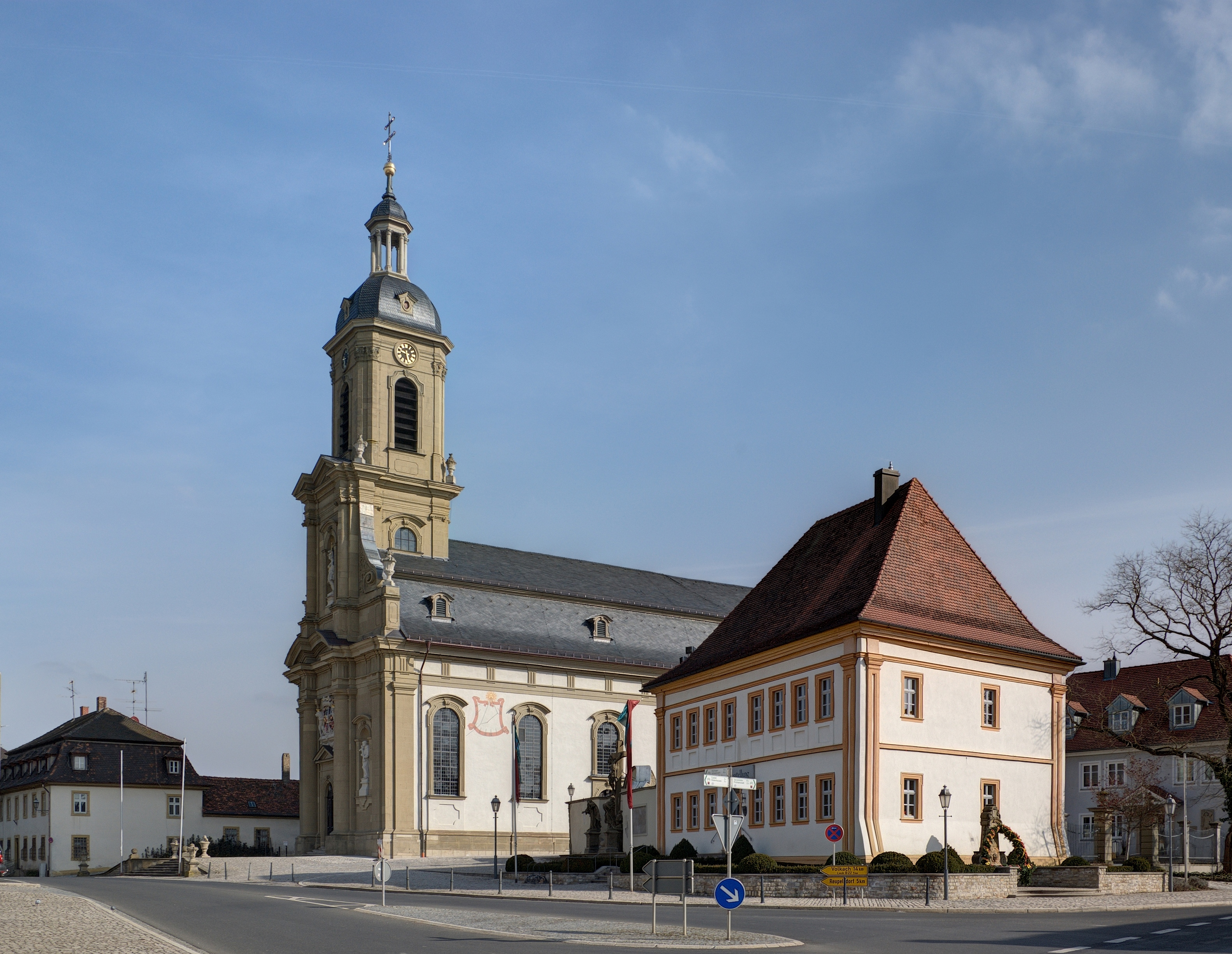
- Church of Saint Maurice and the rectory

- Coat of arms

- Location of Wiesentheid within Kitzingen district
- Interactive map of Wiesentheid
- Location within Germany Location within Bavaria
- Coordinates: 49°48′N 10°21′E
- Country: Germany
- State: Bavaria
- Admin. region: Unterfranken
- District: Kitzingen
- Municipal assoc.: Wiesentheid

Government
  - Mayor (2020–26): Klaus Köhler

Area
  - Total: 33.33 km^{2} (12.87 sq mi)
- Elevation: 249 m (817 ft)

Population (2025-12-31)
  - Total: 4,893
  - Density: 146.8/km^{2} (380.2/sq mi)
- Time zone: UTC+01:00 (CET)
  - Summer (DST): UTC+02:00 (CEST)
- Postal codes: 97353
- Dialling codes: 09383
- Vehicle registration: KT
- Website: www.wiesentheid.de

Wiesentheid is a municipality in the district of Kitzingen in Bavaria in Germany.

== History ==
It was first mentioned in 918 as "Wisenheida". Mediatization in 1806 brought the former county of Schönborn into the Grand Duchy of Würzburg, along with which it became part of the Kingdom of Bavaria in 1814. The Bavarian Municipal Edict of 17 May 1818 (Gemeindeedikt (de)) formed today's Wiesentheid.

== Main sights ==
- Count's Wiesentheid Castle
- Kanzleistrasse – street with historic administrative buildings
- Schlossparkanlage – castle garden (English)
- catholic Church of Saint Maurice built by Balthasar Neumann
- historic vicarage
- historic town hall
- crucifixion memorial built by Jacob van der Auvera
- historic Mariensäule (memorial of Mother Mary)

== Sister city ==
- Rouillac, Charente, France

== Personalities ==
- Johann Georg Fuchs von Dornheim, (1586–1633), prince-bishop of Bamberg, known as the "Hexenbrenner" (witch burner) and the "Hexenbischof" (witch-bishop).
- Carl Stumpf (1848–1936), philosopher, psychologist and musicologist
