= Franckenstein =

Franckenstein may refer to:

- House of Franckenstein
- Lordship of Franckenstein
