= House of Frankenstein =

House of Frankenstein may refer to:

- House of Frankenstein (film), a 1944 horror film produced by Universal Studios
- House of Frankenstein (miniseries), a 1997 television miniseries featuring characters from the Universal Studios horror films
- House of Franckenstein, the German noble family
