= Johannes Karl von und zu Franckenstein =

German Prince-Bishop

- Prince-Bishop of Worms
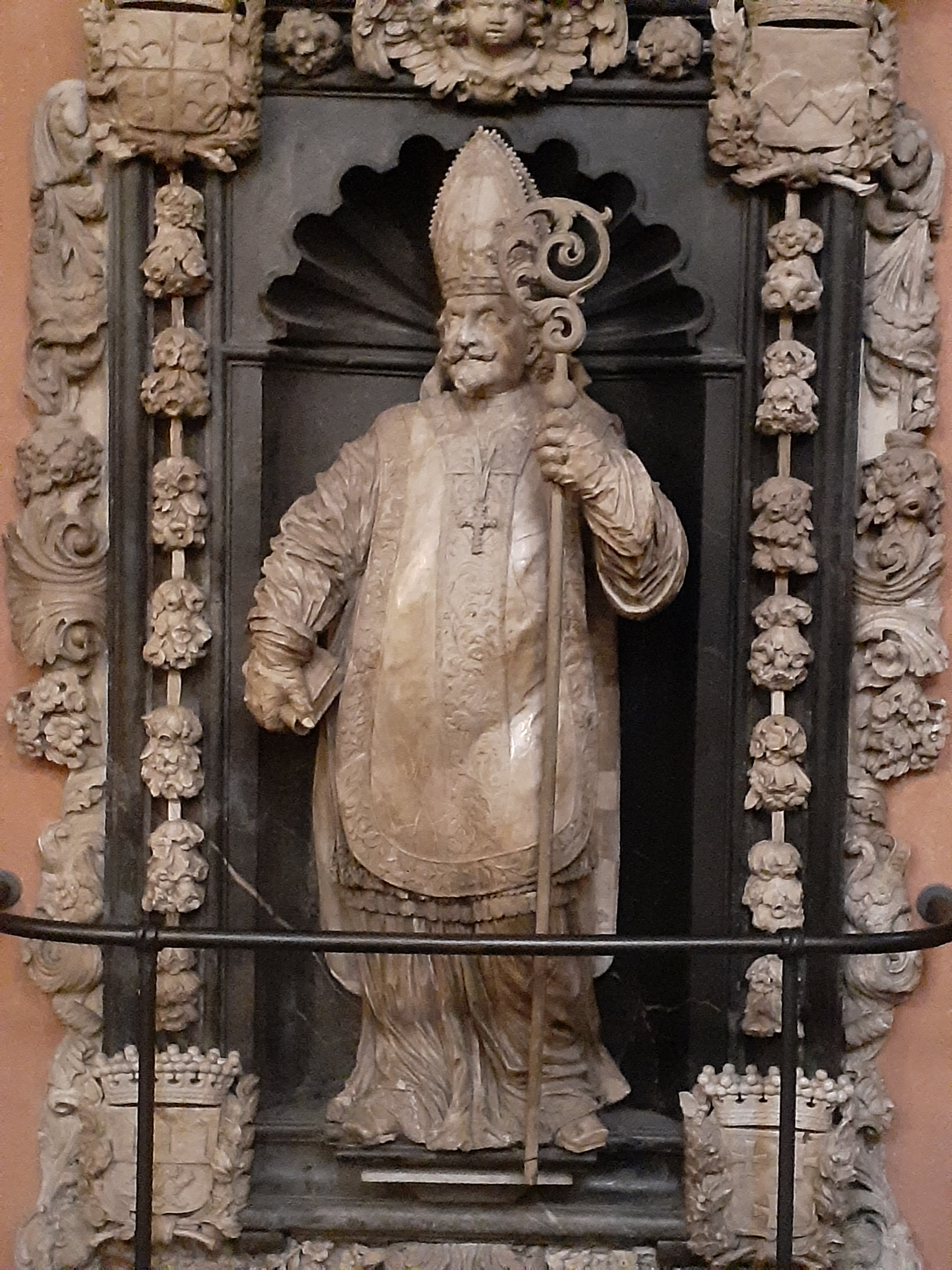
- Church: Roman Catholic Church
- Diocese: Bishopric of Worms
- Appointed: 17 August 1683
- Installed: 1683
- Term ended: 1691
- Predecessor: Franz Emmerich Kaspar von Waldbott von Bassenheim
- Successor: Ludwig Anton von Pfalz-Neuburg

Orders
- Consecration: by Anselm Franz von Ingelheim, Archbishop-Elector of Mainz

Personal details
- Born: 1610 Castle Frankenstein
- Died: 29 September 1691 (aged 80–81)
- Buried: Frankfurt Cathedral

Johannes Karl von und zu Franckenstein (1610–1691) was the Prince-Bishop of Worms from 1683 to 1691.

== Biography ==
A member of the House of Franckenstein, Johannes Karl von und zu Franckenstein was born in Castle Frankenstein in 1610.

On 17 August 1683, the cathedral chapter of Worms Cathedral elected him to be the new Prince-Bishop of Worms. Pope Innocent XI confirmed his appointment on 16 July 1688 and he was consecrated as a bishop by Anselm Franz von Ingelheim, Archbishop-Elector of Mainz, on 5 September 1688.

He died on 29 September 1691 and is buried in Frankfurt Cathedral.

Catholic Church titles
Preceded by Franz Emmerich Kaspar von Waldbott von Bassenheim	Prince-Bishop of Worms; 1683–1691	Succeeded by Ludwig Anton von Pfalz-Neuburg
