= House of Councillors (disambiguation) =

The House of Councillors was the former English name of the Senate, the upper house of the National Diet of Japan.

House of Councillors may also refer to:

- House of Councillors (Bavaria)
- House of Councillors (Morocco)
- House of Councillors (South Korea)
