= Georg Arbogast von Franckenstein =

German Centre Party politician (1825–1890)

His Excellency The Viscount Franckenstein Grand Chancellor SGO
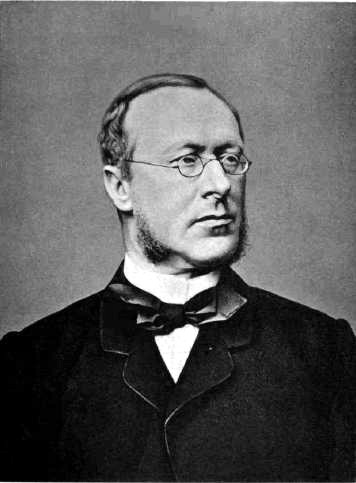

First Vice President of the Reichstag
- In office 30 July 1879 – 1887
- Monarch: Ludwig II
- Preceded by: Franz August Count Schenk von Stauffenberg
- Succeeded by: Franz Count von Ballestrem

House of Councillors (Bavaria)
- In office 15 June 1847 – 22 January 1890
- Preceded by: Charles Viscount Franckenstein
- Succeeded by: John Charles Viscount Franckenstein

Chamberlain
- In office 27 June 1847 – 22 January 1890
- Preceded by: Charles Viscount Franckenstein
- Succeeded by: John Charles Viscount Franckenstein

President of the House of Councillors
- In office 1881–1890
- Preceded by: Franz Count von Stauffenberg
- Succeeded by: Charles Prince of Fugger-Babenhausen
- In office 1891–1893

Member of the Reichstag
- In office 24 Mai 1872 – 1890
- Preceded by: Charles, Prince of Löwenstein-Wertheim-Rosenberg (1834–1921)
- Succeeded by: John Charles Viscount Franckenstein

Personal details
- Born: Georg Arbogast Freiherr von und zu Franckenstein; 2 July 1825 Würzburg, Kingdom of Bavaria,
- Died: 22 January 1890 (aged 64) Berlin, Germany
- Resting place: Ullstadt Castle, Bavaria
- Party: Centre Party (Germany)
- Spouse: Marie Princess Oettingen (m. 1857)
- Relations: Karl von Franckenstein (brother)
- Children: 6
- Parent: Charles Viscount Franckenstein (father)
- Education: Ludwigsgymnasium Munich
- Alma mater: Ludwig-Maximilians-Universität München

Georg Eugen Heinrich Arbogast Reichsfreiherr von und zu Franckenstein (2 July 1825 – 22 January 1890), was a Bavarian-German politician and a leading member of the Catholic Centre Party. Franckenstein was a member of the German Reichstag from 1872 to 1890, where he led the Centre Party parliamentary group leader from 1875 and served as first vice president of the Reichstag from 1879 to 1887. He was also a Bavarian legislator and served as president of the Bavarian House of Lords from 1881 to 1890.

== Early life ==
Franckenstein was a descendant from the House of Franckenstein, which owned the Middle Franconian Lordship Ullstadt and other estates in Baden and Hesse. He was born as the eldest son of Karl Arbogast von und zu Franckenstein, royal chamberlain and hereditary imperial councillor of the Crown of Bavaria, and his wife Leopoldine, née Countess Apponyi de Nagy-Appony. His younger brother was Baron Karl von und zu Franckenstein.

Franckenstein began studying law at the Ludwig-Maximilians-Universität München, but already in 1845, after the death of his father, he took over the administration of the Franckenstein family estates.

== Career ==
In 1847, Franckenstein was introduced as his father's successor into the House of Councillors, the first chamber of the Bavarian Parliament, to which he belonged until his death and of which he was president from 1881 to 1890. His entry into the Chamber was also accompanied by his appointment as Royal Chamberlain and his admission to the Order of St George, to whose Grand Chancellor he rose in 1879.

He was soon regarded as a champion of a Catholic-patriotic course in the first chamber of the Bavarian parliament, voted with the defeated minority against the Zollverein Treaty in 1867, but accepted his election to the customs parliament (constituency of Eichstätt) in 1868. In the chamber of imperial councillors he continued to represent a particular path for Bavaria: although he voted in favour of Bavaria's entry into the Franco-Prussian War, on 20 July 1870, he was one of only three Imperial Councillors to vote "no" in the vote of 30 December 1870 on the November Treaties and Bavaria's accession to the German Reich. Franckenstein supported the Bavarian Order of St George in caring for the wounded during the war and later advised the Bavarian King Ludwig II on the reorganisation of the Order of Knights.

=== Imperial Politics ===
After the foundation of the German Empire in the Hall of Mirrors at Versailles, Franckenstein initially withdrew into Bavarian politics. However, after Charles, Prince of Löwenstein-Wertheim-Rosenberg (1834–1921) resigned his Reichstag seat for the constituency of Lohr, Franckenstein was elected there on 24 May 1872 in the necessary by-election and represented the constituency of Lohr in the Reichstag until 1890 (re-elections in 1874, 1877, 1878, 1881, 1884 and 1887). Franckenstein joined the centrist faction and quickly positioned himself as the spokesman for the Bavarian centrist deputies. He was elected to the executive committee of the parliamentary group and became parliamentary group chairman in 1875, succeeding the late Karl Friedrich von Savigny. From 1879 to 1887 he was also vice-chairman of the Reichstag.

In imperial politics, Franckenstein, as one of the spokesmen for political Catholicism, was initially a bitter opponent of Bismarck in the Kulturkampf. However, after Bismarck's domestic political turnaround in 1878/79, which was associated with the first steps towards defusing the Kulturkampf, Franckenstein's Centre faction grew into a key position in the Reichstag: Bismarck now needed the centre for important legislative projects and Franckenstein became his preferred contact in the faction. This first became apparent in the transition to a protective tariff policy in 1879, when Franckenstein - through direct negotiations with Bismarck - was pushing through the so-called Franckenstein clause in the tariff commission of the Reichstag, which was significant for the financial constitution of the empire and was named after him. From 1880 onwards, he distinguished himself in the field of social policy and, as chairman of the relevant Reichstag commissions, helped to push through the social insurance laws (sickness (1883), accident (1884), old-age and invalidity insurance (1889)). Here considerable conflict (intended by Bismarck) arose between Franckenstein and the Centre leader Ludwig Windthorst, who wanted to make the approval of the parliamentary group dependent on concessions made by Bismarck in terms of church policy. The law on old age and invalidity was rejected by Windthorst and the majority of the parliamentary group, but was passed via a minority of the parliamentary group led by Franckenstein. However, in the serious September crisis of 1887, Windthorst and Franckenstein jointly and decisively rejected the attempted influence of the Curia on Centre policy.

=== Bavarian politics and influence ===
In Bavarian politics, Franckenstein was considered "the coming man" by Georg von Hertling and the bearer of hope for the conservative forces in the difficult domestic political situation of the 1870s and 80s, which was characterised by "the fact that an ideologically liberal, politically state-conservative, empire-friendly and state-church-oriented state ministry continued to govern against a conservative, emphatically Bavarian-estate and Catholic majority of the Chamber of Deputies" (Dieter Albrecht). King Ludwig II wanted to appoint Franckenstein as chairman of the Council of Ministers after the state parliamentary elections of 1875, but Franckenstein refused because he feared that Bismarck would perceive the appointment of a high-profile Catholic as a provocation and use it as an opportunity to pursue anti-Bavarian policies. When there was renewed speculation about a "Franckenstein Ministry" in the context of the 1881 state elections, Bismarck took a firm stand against it, and Ludwig II followed the pressure and once again expressed his confidence in the liberal Lutz Government.

Franckenstein was involved in the royal tragedy surrounding Ludwig II in 1886 as the King's personal confidant and as President of the Chamber of Imperial Councillors; contemporary rumours that Ludwig II had wanted to form a "Franckenstein Government" at the last moment and that he had been prepared to do so can today be considered refuted; however, Prince Regent Luitpold's relationship with Franckenstein remained strained due to these rumours.

== Personal life ==
He resided at Ullstadt Castle and in 1857 married Princess Marie von Oettingen-Wallerstein, the daughter of Prince Karl Krafft von Oettingen-Wallerstein. The couple had six children, three daughters and three sons, including the Centre politicians Johann Karl and Moritz von Franckenstein.

== Literature ==
- Karl O. von Aretin: Franckenstein Eine politische Karriere zwischen Bismarck und Ludwig II.. Klett-Cotta, Stuttgart 2003, ISBN 3-608-94286-6.
- Karl Otmar von Aretin (1961). "Franckenstein, Freiherren von und zu". Neue Deutsche Biographie (in German). Vol. 5. Berlin: Duncker & Humblot. pp. 329–329. (Ottmar Freiherr von Aretin.html full text online).
