= House of Breuberg =

Noble family in Germany

- Noble house
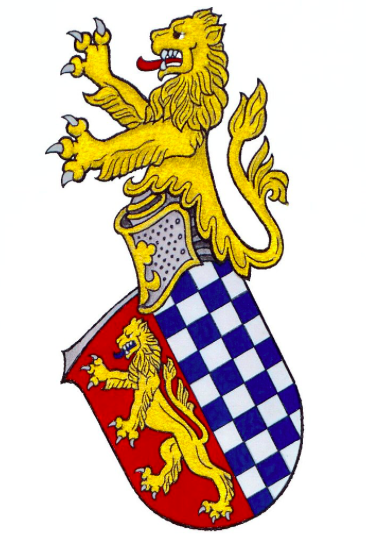
- Divided and split shield, coated on the right with a golden and blue-crowned lion, left roughened in silver and blue
- Country: Holy Roman Empire
- Origin: Duchy of Franconia
- Founded: 1115
- Founder: Conradus Reis de Lucelenbach
- Titles: Imperial Reeve (Reichsvogt) of the Wetterau; Governor of Thuringia; Imperial Baron; Commander of the Imperial army in Thuringia
- Motto: audax et fortunatus ("audacious and fortunate")

The House of Breuberg is the name of a dynastic, Franconian, noble family in Germany, descendants from the Lords of Lützelbach.

== History ==
Around the year 1050, the territory of Höchst detached itself from the March (territory) Umstadt, which had already been erected by the Imperial Abbey of Fulda in about 755. In order to protect their interests and territory the abbots of Fulda then used the noble lords of Lützelbach as bailiffs, already holders of allods in the area. Ludwig of Lucelenbach is the first family member mentioned in 1115 followed by his descendant Wieknand, grandfather of the first Breuberg, Konrad I (Reiz von Lützelbach) confirmed in documents in 1160 and by his son Konrad again in 1189.

Their ancestral castle was previously suspected to be near the Lützelbach Protestant Church. In 2001 a strong foundation was found during the excavation of pipe trenches at the Lützelbach cemetery, presumably a keep, which archaeologically supports this assumption.

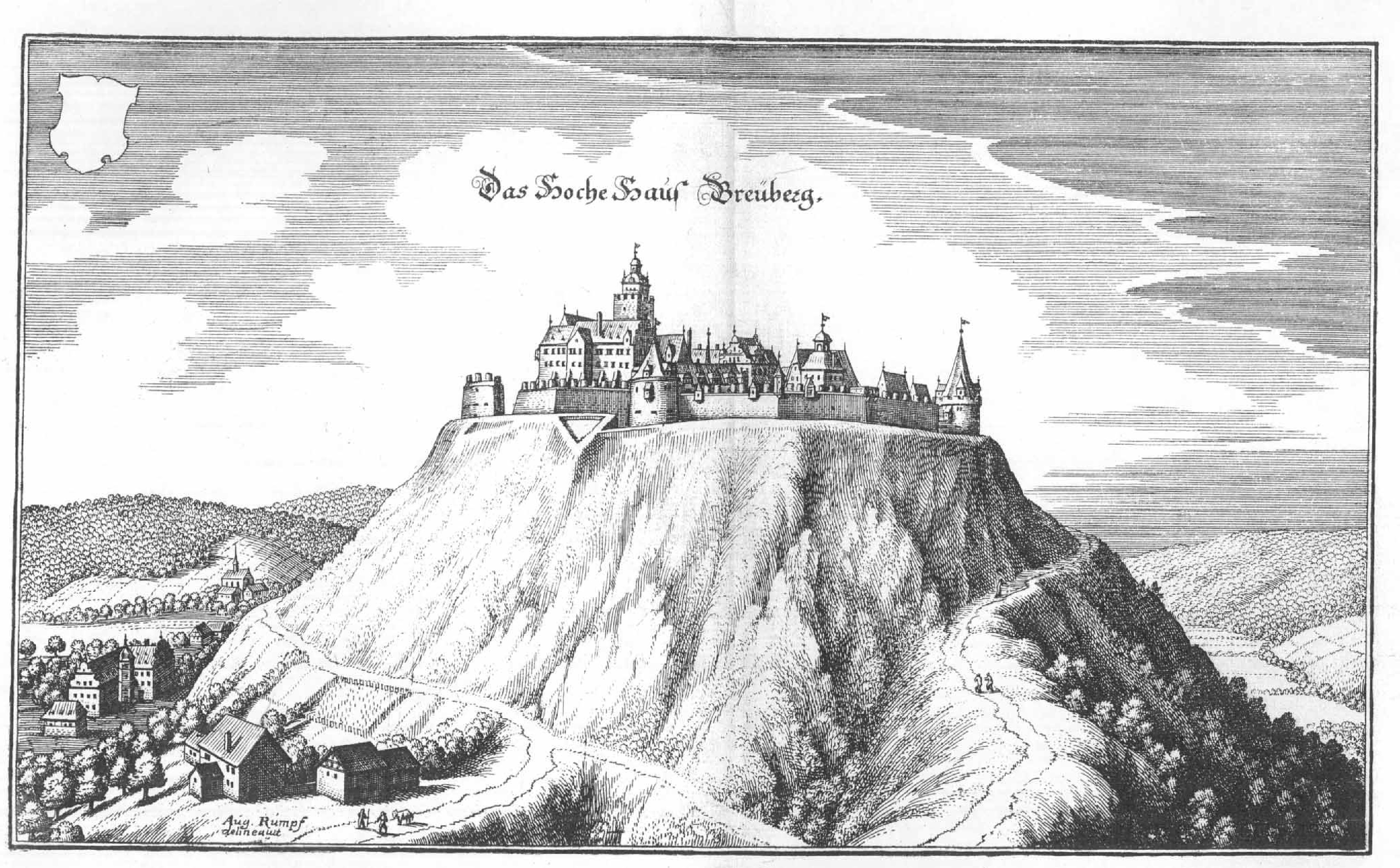
Breuberg Castle, residence of the House of Breuberg, later inherited by the House of Erbach

Konrad I and his descendants built Breuberg castle around 1200 and named themselves after it from then onwards. Thanks to the marriage of his son Eberhard I von Breuberg to Mechtild (Elisabeth?) in 1239, one of the hereditary daughters of the imperial bailiff Gerlach II von Büdingen, the family increased its power, properties and interests also to the Wetterau, where Konrad II (builder of Frankenstein Castle), Arrois, Gerlach and Eberhard III successively held the office of imperial bailiff of the Wetterau. All of them found their last resting place in the monastery Konradsdorf near Ortenberg, being donators and supervisors of the foundation.

Under Gerlach (1245-1306) and his son Eberhard III, the family reached its zenith with the greatest territorial expansion, power and possessions. In 1282 under the reign of King Rudolf I of Germany, the Breuberg family's possessions, in addition to the original possessions of the house of Büdingen, could be extended by the high-court of Selbold and the Gelnhausen Mint (facility). The lordship included the imperial city of Mosbach am Neckar, the Schwäbisch Hall Mint and Köppern, Bergen and Oberrad as imperial fiefs in 1297. The highlight of this expansion of power was the acquisition of the Frankfurt castle Saalhof in 1282 as an imperial fief (pledged loan) from King Rudolf I. Louis IV, Holy Roman Emperor confirmed to Eberhard III of Breuberg in 1317 the fiefdom of Gründau and the Saalhof with the associated fishing and shipping rights.

== Coat of arms ==
Divided and split shield, coated on the right with a golden and blue-crowned lion, left roughened in silver and blue

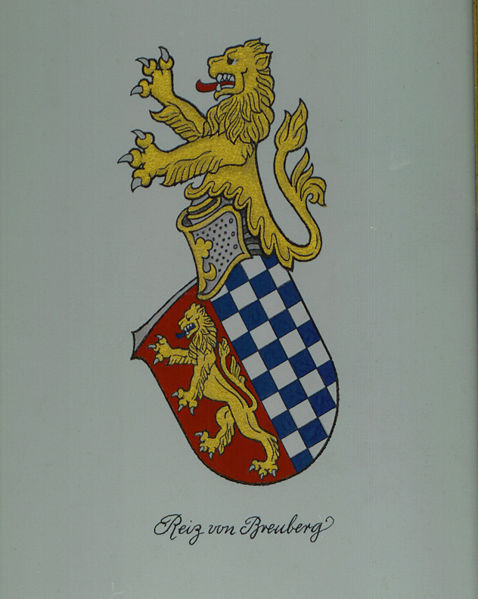
First coat of arms Lords of Breuberg

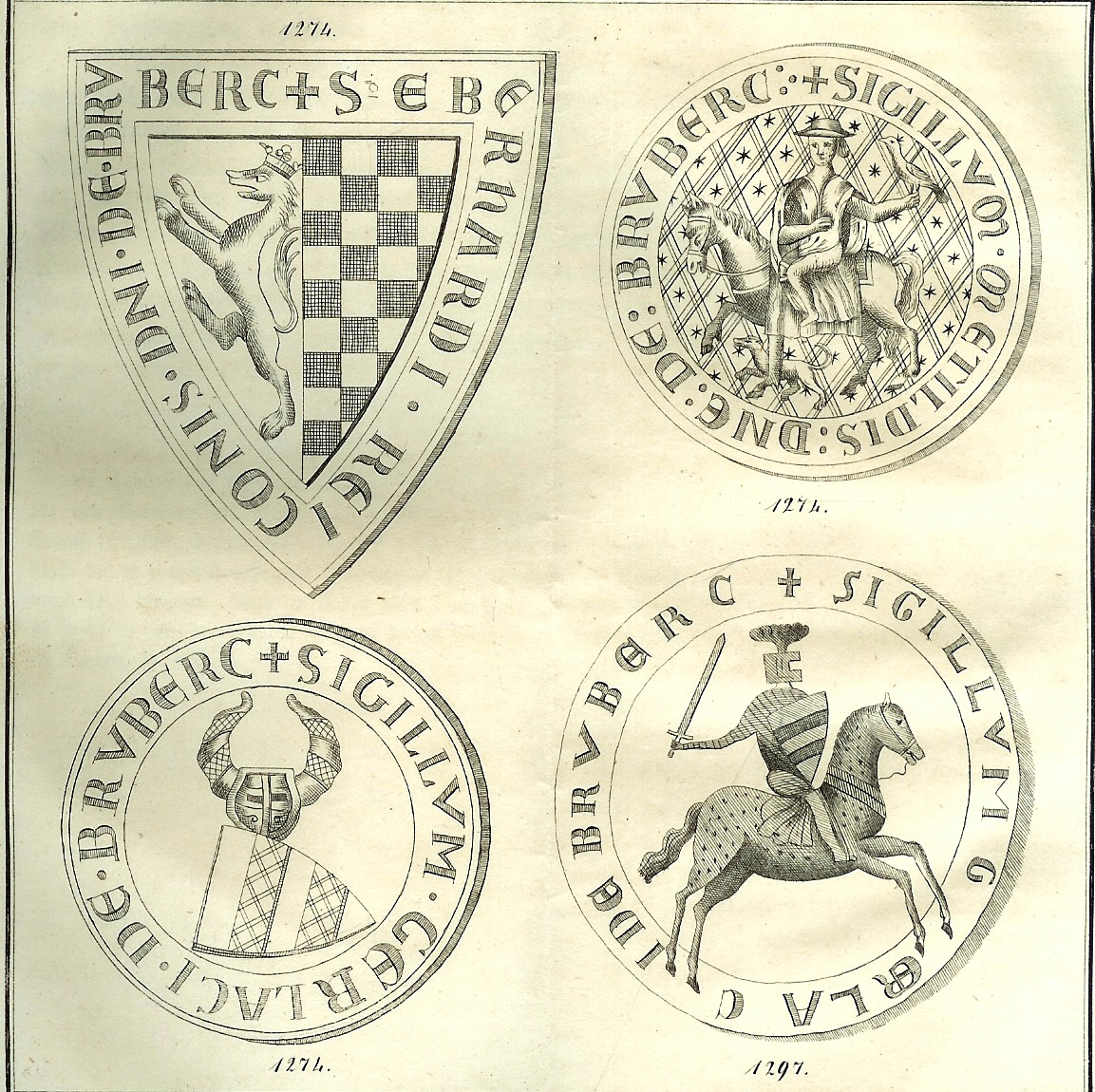
Breuberg arms over the medieval times

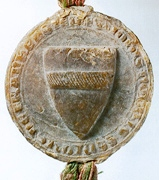
Breuberg Seal from 1291

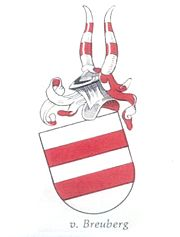
Crest of the Breuberg lordship around 1330–1350

== Famous family members ==
- Conrad I. Reiz von Breuberg, first bearer of the name and presumed builder of Breuberg Castle
- Konrad II. of Breuberg († 1292), as Konrad I. of Frankenstein first name bearer and builder of Frankenstein Castle
- Gerlach of Breuberg (* around 1245 † 1306), imperial reeve of the Wetterau, governor and vice-king in Thuringia
- Eberhard III. of Breuberg († 1323), imperial reeve of the Wetterau

== Family tree ==
Ludewig Reis de Lucelenbach

1. Wiknand of Lützelbach († 1160)
  1. Albrecht of Lützelbach († 1180)
  2. Konrad Reiz of Lützelbach (1178–1209)
    1. Konrad I. Reiz of Breuberg († 1242); oo Agnes of Jagesberg-Ebersberg († 1279)
      1. Eberhard I. Reiz of Breuberg († 1286); oo Elisabeth Countess of Büdingen († 1274)
        1. Gerlach of Breuberg (* um 1245; † 1306), imperial reeve of the Wetterau, Governor and Vice-King in Thuringia, oo Lukardis of Eppstein
          1. Eberhard III. of Breuberg († 1323); oo Mechthild Countess of Waldeck (1287 - after 1340)
            1. Gerlach
            2. Elisabeth († 1358); oo 1321 Count Rudolf IV. of Wertheim (1305–1354)
            3. Lukard (Lutgard); I. oo 1326 Konrad VI. of Weinsberg († 1328); II. oo 1328 Gottfried V. of Eppstein)
        2. Agnes (*?; † 10. Juli 1302) oo 1323 Eberhard V, Schenk Count of Erbach (* before 1277, † before 1303)
        3. Arrois of Breuberg († after 1324); oo Gisela Countess of Falkenstein († 1314)
          1. Kunigunde (Chuntzinne) († 1358); oo before 1324 Konrad V. of Trimberg
          2. Mechthild (1317–1329), Nun
        4. Eberhard II. of Breuberg, Abbot
      2. Sigebodo of Breuberg (*before 1246), Archdeacon of the Würzburg chapter
      3. Konrad II. Reiz of Breuberg (simultaneously Konrad I. of Frankenstein) († 1264); oo Elisabeth von Weiterstadt

== Literature ==
- Genealogisches Handbuch des Adels Band 27; Freiherrliche Häuser A IV, CA Starke Verlag.
- Genealogisches Handbuch des Adels, Band 61, 1975, Adelslexikon. Starke, Limburg/Lahn
- Otto von Waldenfels (Hrsg.): Genealogisches Handbuch des in Bayern immatrikulierten Adels. Verlag Degener, Neustadt an der Aisch.
- Hellmuth Gensicke: Untersuchungen zur Genealogie und Besitzgeschichte der Herren von Eschollbrücken, Weiterstadt, Lützelbach, Breuberg und Frankenstein. In: Hessische historische Forschungen (1963), S.99–115
- Historischer Verein für Hessen, Archiv für hessische Geschichte und Altertumskunde.
