= Lordship of Franckenstein =

Feudal territory of the Holy Roman Empire

Lordship of Franckenstein Herrschaft Frankenstein
- 13th century—1662
- Coat of arms

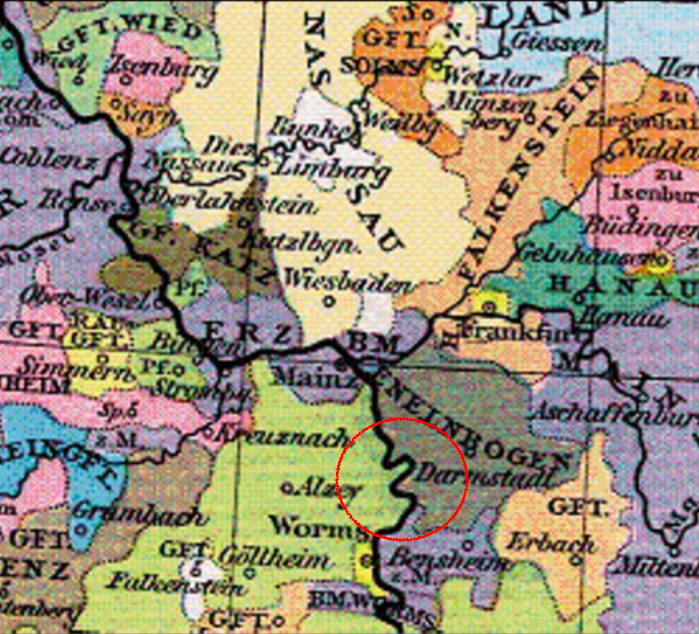
- Location of the Lordship in the Hesse region
- Status: State of the Holy Roman Empire
- Capital: Frankenstein Castle
- Common languages: Hessian
- Religion: Roman Catholic
- Government: Feudal Lordship
- Historical era: Late medieval
  - Established: 13th century
  - Disestablished: 1662
Succeeded by
Landgraviate of Hesse-Darmstadt / Landgraviate of Hesse-Darmstadt

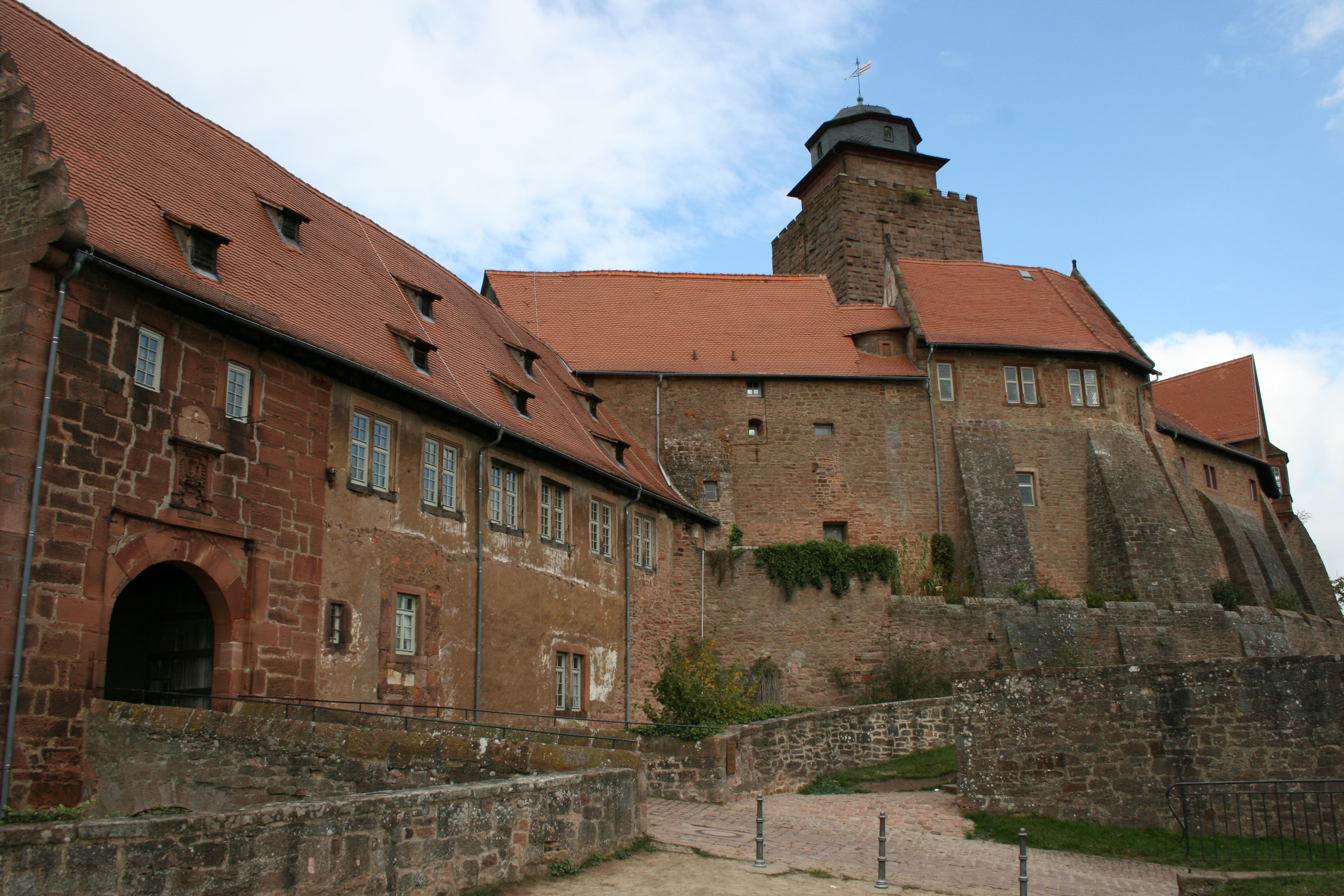
Breuberg main castle and gate building

The Lordship of Franckenstein was a historical territory in the northern Odenwald. It originated around 1230 from the possessions of the Breuberg, whose center was Frankenstein Castle. Konrad II of Breuberg and his wife Elisabeth of Weiterstadt called themselves Frankenstein after having build the castle henceforth. The dominion remained as condominium in the possession of the family until the year 1662. After the sale by the Frankensteis to Landgrave Louis VI, Landgrave of Hesse-Darmstadt, it came into the possession of Hesse-Darmstadt.

== History ==
=== Breuberg ===
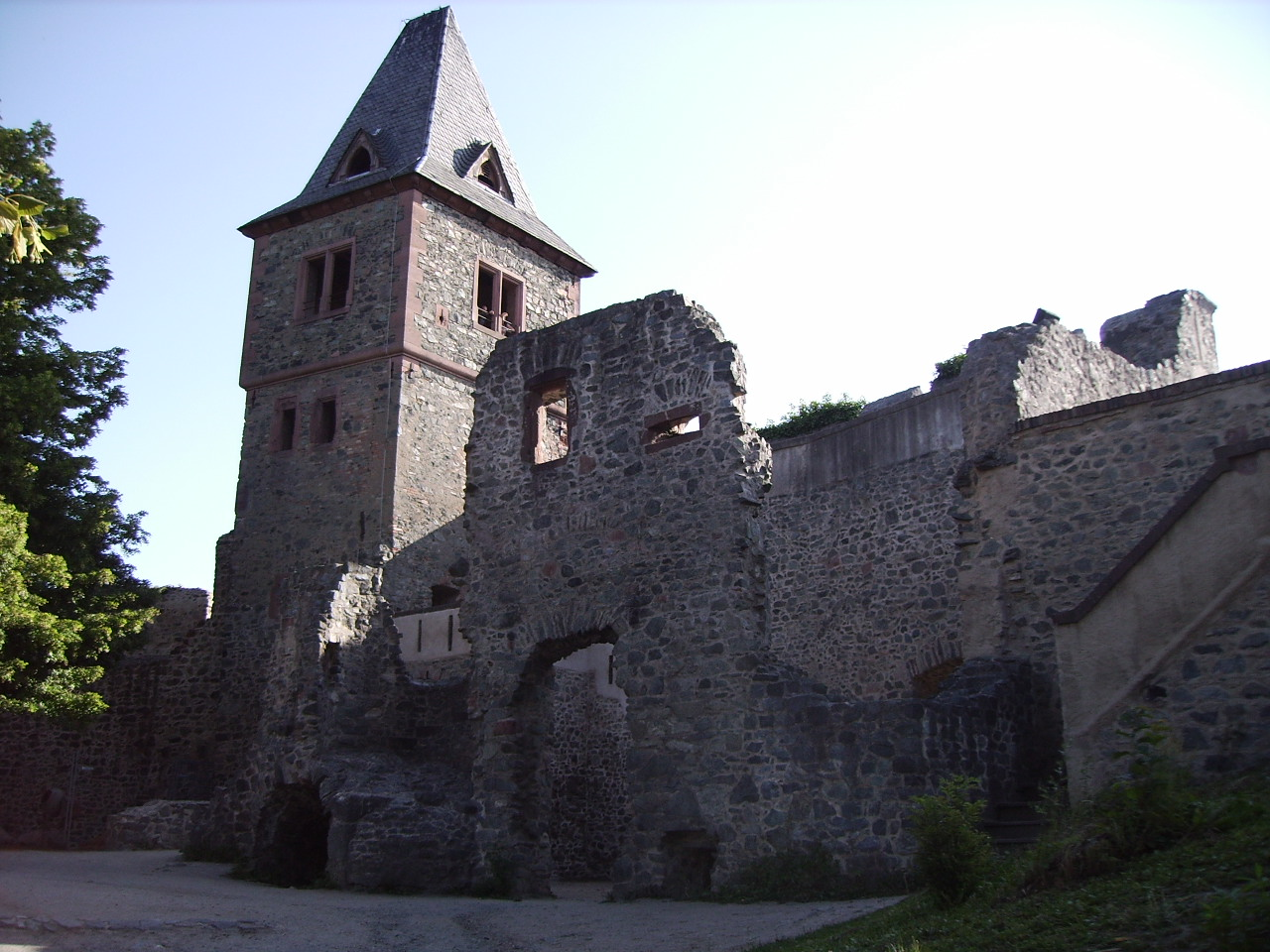
Ruins of Frankenstein Castle

=== Franckenstein ===
Ludovic of Luetzelbach was the ancestor of the House of Frankenstein and is mentioned in documents for the first time in 1115.

The latter's grandson Konrad I and his descendants built the eponymous Breuberg Castle around 1200 and subsequently called themselves Breuberg. Through the marriage of his son Eberhard I Reiz of Breuberg with Mechtild (Elisabeth?), one of the five heir daughters of the bailiff Gerlach II of Büdingen in 1239, the Lords of Breuberg could increase their power, property and interests into the Wetterau, where the Breubergs Arrois, Konrad, Gerlach and Eberhard III successively held the office of imperial bailiff of the Wetterau.

Konrad II Reiz of Breuberg -later Konrad I of Frankenstein- built the ancestral castle of the dynasty probably around 1240, named himself after the castle from then on and thus became the founder of the Lordship of Frankenstein.

== Territory ==
The domain of the Frankensteins included possessions in Nieder-Beerbach, Eberstadt, Ockstadt (with Ockstadt Castle) near Friedberg and the Hessisches Ried. Under Frankenstein overlordship (suzerain) were Eberstadt (today to Darmstadt), Nieder-Beerbach (today to Mühltal), Ober-Beerbach (today Seeheim-Jugenheim), Schmal-Beerbach (today to Lautertal), Stettbach today to Seeheim-Jugenheim), Allertshofen (today Modautal), Bobstadt, Ockstadt as well as parts of Weiterstadt. In addition, the Frankensteins held further property and lordly rights as Burgraves in Zwingenberg (Schloss Auerbach), Darmstadt, Groß-Gerau (Dornberg Castle), Bensheim and finally Frankfurt am Main, which are still commemorated by Frankensteiner Place and Frankensteiner Street in the Sachsenhausen district.

The dominion in the northern Odenwald was with the beginning of documentary tradition in 1252 probably already formed. From the wording of the document "super castro in frangenstein" ("at the castle in Frankenstein"), however, it is clear that the castle was already built and used at that time. The exact time of origin is uncertain; conjectures go back to Frankish period.

== Condominium ==
In the course of the 14th century, the Frankenstein dynasty split into two lines. They then divided the castle according to a meticulously described castle contract of 1363. Nevertheless, constant legal disputes between the two lines were the result.

Around the year 1400, the influence of the Frankensteins increased. The castle, which had become too small, was massively extended and modernised around the outer castle. In 1402, the castle, together with Nieder-Beerbach, became an Imperial estate.

== Literature ==
- J. Friedrich Battenberg: Roßdorf in pre-modern times. Everyday life and conflict culture of a Hessian rural community in the 17th and 18th centuries. in: Archiv für hessische Geschichte und Altertumskunde, vol. N.F. 60 (2002), ISSN 0066-636X, pp. 29-60.
- Roman Fischer: Findbuch zum Bestand Frankensteinische Lehenurkunden 1251-1812. Kramer, Frankfurt am Main 1992, ISBN 3-7829-0433-8.
- Hellmuth Gensicke: Studies on the Genealogy and Property History of the Lords of Eschollbrücken, Weiterstadt, Lützelbach, Breuberg and Frankenstein. in: Hessische historische Forschungen (1963), pp. 99-115.
- Rudolf Kunz: Dorfordnungen der Herrschaft Franckenstein aus der 2. Hälfte des 16. Jahrhunderts. Offprint from: Archiv für hessische Geschichte und Altertumskunde. Volume 26, Issue 1, 1958.
- Wolfgang Weißgerber: The Lords of Frankenstein and their wives in Die Herren von Frankenstein und ihre Frauen: Landschaften, Personen, Geschichten, Darmstadt-Eberstadt, Schlapp 2002; ISBN 3-87704-050-0., Schlapp 2002; ISBN 3-87704-050-0.
- Karl Otmar Freiherr von Aretin (1961). "Franckenstein, Freiherren von und zu". Neue Deutsche Biographie (in German). Vol. 5. Berlin: Duncker & Humblot. p. 329. (full text online).
- Anke Stößer: Herrschaften zwischen Rhein und Odenwald. in: Knights, Counts and Princes - secular dominions in the Hessian region c. 900-1806 (= Handbuch der hessischen Geschichte 3 = Publications of the Historical Commission for Hesse 63). Marburg 2014, ISBN 978-3-942225-17-5, pp. 152-170, esp. pp. 163-165.
  - (ed.) Geschichtsverein Eberstadt/Frankenstein: Lesebuch zur Geschichte Frankenstein. Burg - Herrschaft - Familie, Darmstadt-Eberstadt 2018.
