= House of Councillors (Bavaria) =

Upper house of the Bavarian Landtag

House of Councillors German: Kammer der Reichsräte

Type
- Type: Upper house of the Landtag of the Kingdom of Bavaria

The House of Councillors (German: Kammer der Reichsräte) was the upper house of the Landtag of the Kingdom of Bavaria during its existence both as an independent state and as a federal subject of the German Empire. The House of Councillors was established by the 1818 Constitution of the Kingdom, and its composition and powers remained unchanged until its abolition under the 1919 Bamberg Constitution .

== History ==
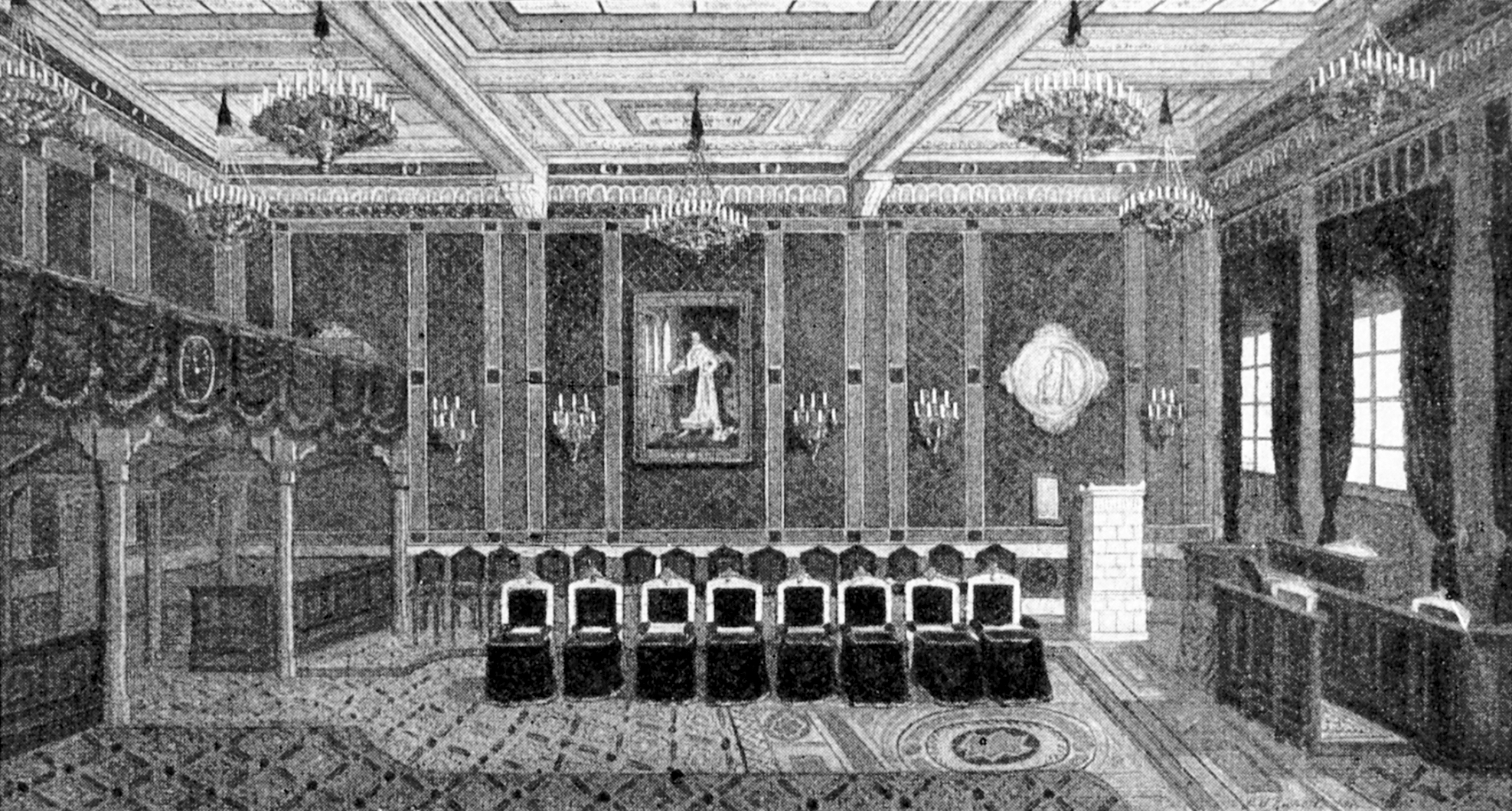
Conference chamber of the Reichsräte, Munich, 1884

Modeled after the British House of Lords, the House of Councillors was intended to serve as an intermediary between the Crown and the Chamber of Deputies, and formally served as the lower house's equal. Its members comprised the aristocracy and noblemen, including the royal princes, holders of the crown offices, archbishops, members of the mediatized houses in Bavaria and hereditary and lifelong nominees of the crown.

The House of Councillors held its sessions in secret, which is one of the reasons why it received little public attention during the Vormärz in Bavaria. Recent research suggests that the power of the House of Councillors far exceeded that of the Chamber of Deputies.

=== Abolition ===
From 1919 on under the Bamberg Constitution in the Weimar Republic, the upper house of the Landtag was abolished and its lower house became a unicameral democratic elected assembly.

=== Presidents of the Imperial Council ===
- 1819–1837: Prince Karl Philipp von Wrede
- 1840: Sebastian von Schrenck
- 1842–1848: Prince Karl zu Leiningen
- 1848–1881: Franz von Stauffenberg
- 1881–1890: Georg von und zu Franckenstein
- 1891–1893: Karl Fugger von Babenhausen
- 1893–1904: Ludwig von Lerchenfeld-Köfering
- 1905–1911: Ernst zu Löwenstein-Wertheim-Freudenberg
- 1911–1918: Carl Fugger von Glött

== See also ==
- Bavarian Senate
