= House of Franckenstein =

Defunct German royal house (Founded 1245) Part of "The Holy Roman Empire"

- Noble house
- Ancestral arms of Frankenstein
- Country: Holy Roman Empire; Kingdom of Bavaria; Austro Hungarian Empire
- Origin: Odenwald, Duchy of Franconia
- Founded: 1245
- Founder: Conrad of Breuberg
- Titles: Reichsvogt of the Wetterau; Prince-Bishop of Speyer; Prince-Bishop of Worms; Prince-Bishop of Bamberg; Imperial Baron; Peer of Bavaria
- Motto: verus et fidelis ("true and faithful")

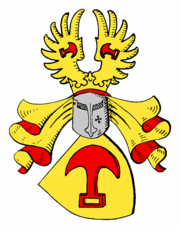
Armorials of Frankenstein ancient: An oblique red battle axe on Gold. These arms are still used by the Barons of Franckenstein

Arms of Franckensteinmodern: complemented in 1533 by Henry IV. of Frankenstein (d.1558) by the arms of Clover, being the heir of the Lords of Cleen. The Cleens were also heirs of Praunheim and Sachsenhausen, therefore also adding the silver helmet of the Praunheims combined with the swans of Sachsenhausen to the crest.Divided and split two times coated with a golden heartshield, therein an oblique red battle axe on Gold (Franckenstein). In fields 1 and 6 in gold a three-leaf red cloverleaf (von Cleen), in fields 2 and 5 in blue a right-sided silver helmet, on it a growing silver swan, whose raised red wings are each covered with a silver bar, 3 and 4 in gold a red bar, above 3 green twigs each with 3 leaves (von Praunheim-Sachsenhausen).

The House of Franckenstein (also Frankenstein) is the name of a feudal, Franconian noble family in Germany, descendants from the Dynasts of the Breuberg family; offsprings of the Lords of Lützelbach from Höchst im Odenwald.

== Family legend ==
In 948, an Arbogast von Franckenstein confirmed to the abbot of Lorsch Abbey in two contracts to "grant defense and shield the carriages travelling on the Bergstraße and passing through Frankenstein realm". In the same year, this knight Arbogast is supposed to have won the Tournament of Cologne, thanks to an invitation of the Archbishop Bruno the Great, who was said to have been the former abbot of Lorsch Abbey. Arbogast von Franckenstein is mentioned in Georg Rüxner's Thurnierbuch, but is probably legendary as Rüxners's statements, especially those citing "earlier centuries", are often deemed. The contracts are not found in the Lorsch Abbey archives but appear only in secondary literature. The Franckenstein clan is descended from Lord Konrad II of Breuberg, who built Frankenstein Castle sometime before 1252.

== History ==
Ludovic of Luetzelbach was the first documented ancestor of the Frankenstein dynasty and is first recorded in the year 1115, his descendant Wieknand again in 1160.

His grandson Konrad I. and his offspring built the homonymous Breuberg Castle around 1200 and named themselves after it. In 1239, owing to his son's Eberhard I. Reiz von Breuberg marriage with Mechtild (Elisabeth?), one of the five heiresses of Gerlach II. von Büdingen, imperial bailiff of the Wetteraukreis, the power, possessions and interests were also relocated into the Wetterau region, where the Breubergians Arrois, Gerlach and Eberhard III. held the bailiffship consecutively. They found their last resting-place in the monastery of Konradsdorf, where the family had made many donations. Before 1250, Lord Konrad II. Reiz von Breuberg erected Frankenstein Castle near Darmstadt and since named himself "von und zu Frankenstein". He was the founder of the free imperial lordship Frankenstein, which was subject only to the jurisdiction of the emperor, with possessions in Nieder-Beerbach, Darmstadt, Ockstadt, Wetterau and Hesse. Additionally the Frankensteins held other possession and Sovereignty-rights as Burgraves in Zwingenberg (Auerbach (Bensheim), in Darmstadt, Groß-Gerau, Frankfurt am Main and Bensheim.

In the year 1292 the Frankensteins opened the castle to the counts of Katzenelnbogen (County of Katzenelnbogen) and leagued with them. Being both strong opponents of the Protestant Reformation and following territorial conflicts, connected disputes with the Landgraviate of Hesse-Darmstadt, as well as the adherence to the catholic faith and the associated "right of patronage", the family head Lord Johannes I. decided to sell the lordship to the landgrave in 1662, after various lawsuits at the Imperial Chamber Court.

Because of many vacancies in relation with the reformation, some family members could fill a number of unengaged offices and posts in various Chapters, Abbeys and Dioceses as Canons, Abbesses and Prince-Bishops. After the sale of Frankenstein and being awarded the imperial baron dignity in 1670, the family retired to its possessions in Wetterau and acquired the lordship of Ullstadt in the beginning of the 17th century in Middle Franconia. In the 19th century they also bought the Lordship of Thalheim bei Wels in Austria. The family still consists of two existing branches in Germany, Austria and the US.

== Prominent family members ==
- Konrad II Reiz von Breuberg (1245–1292), also Konrad I von Frankenstein, first bearer of the family name
- Apetzko (Apeczko - Arbogast) von Frankenstein (1345–1352), Bishop of Lebus
- Rudolf von und zu Frankenstein (1552–1560), Prince-Bishop of Speyer
- Johann Karl von und zu Franckenstein (1683–1691), Prince-Bishop of Worms
- Johann Philipp Anton von Franckenstein (1746–1753), Prince-Bishop of Bamberg
- Georg Arbogast von Franckenstein (1825–1890), German member of Parliament, Vice President of Zentrumspartei, President of the Bavarian House of Lords
- Karl von und zu Franckenstein (1831–1898), a diplomat of the Austro-Hungarian Empire
- Clemens von und zu Franckenstein (1875–1942), German composer and last general director of the Royal Bavarian Opera and Theatres
- Georg von und zu Franckenstein (1878–1953), GCVO, K.u.K. Special Envoy to the Osman Imperial Court, Austrian Ambassador in London from 1920–1938, later Sir George Franckenstein
- Kay, Baroness Franckenstein (née Boyle) (1902–1992), American writer and political activist
- Joseph Freiherr von Franckenstein (1910–1963), Austro-German fighter against the Nazi regime, editor-in-chief of Die Neue Zeitung
- Clement von Franckenstein (1944–2019), British-American actor; son of Sir George Franckenstein

== Picture gallery ==
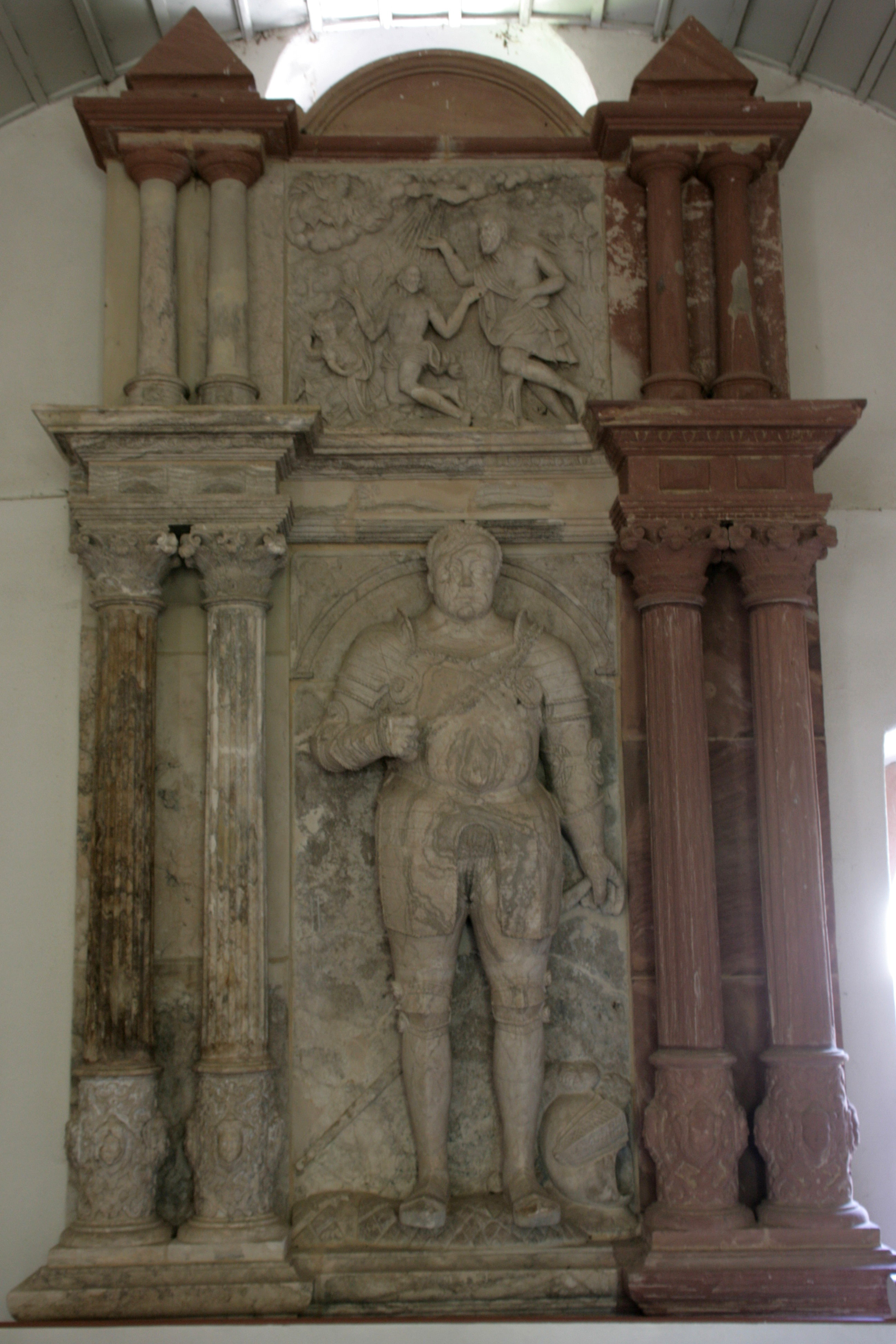
Lord Philipp Louis Franckenstein

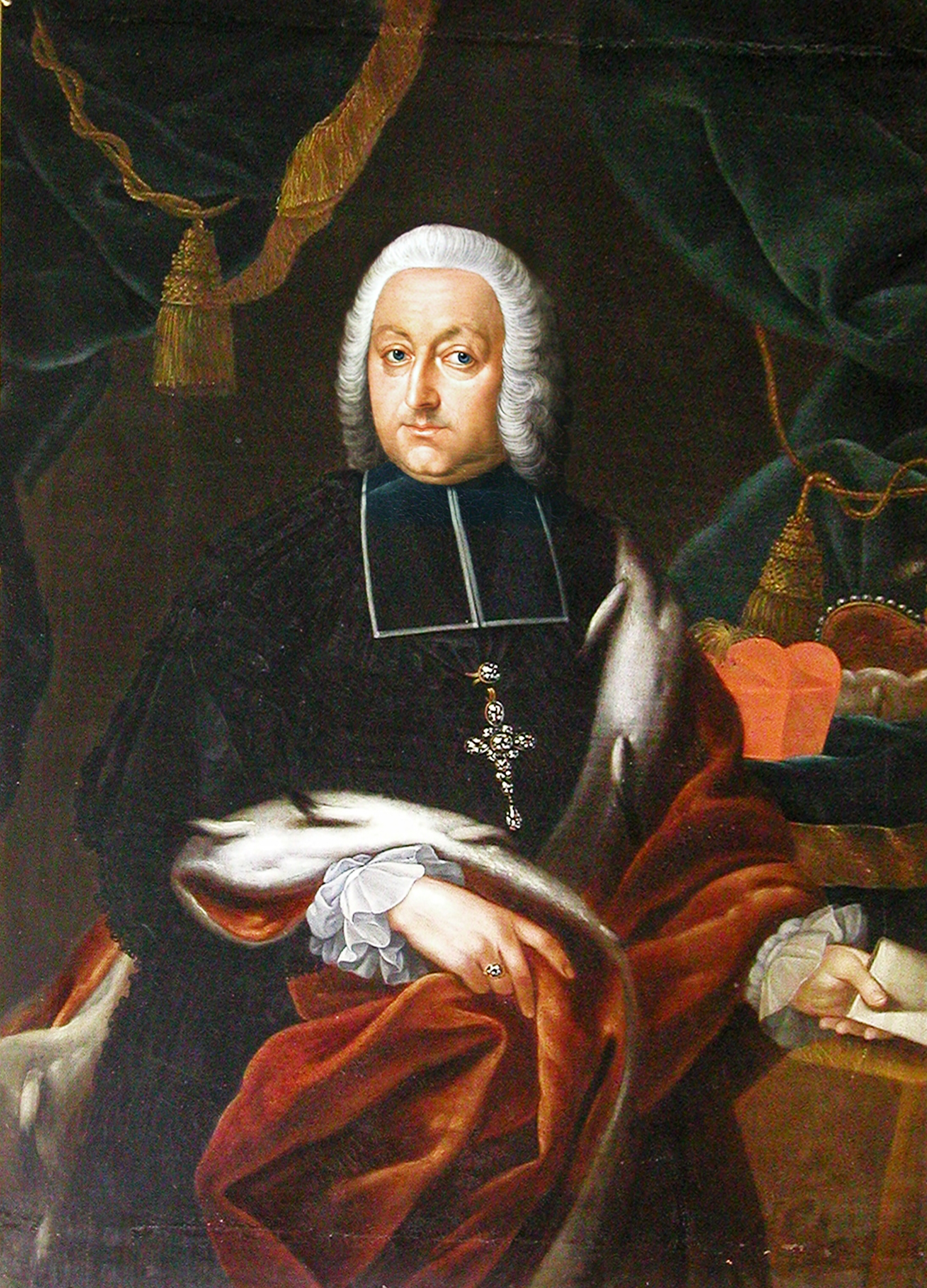
Philipp Antony Franckenstein, Prince-Bishop of Bamberg

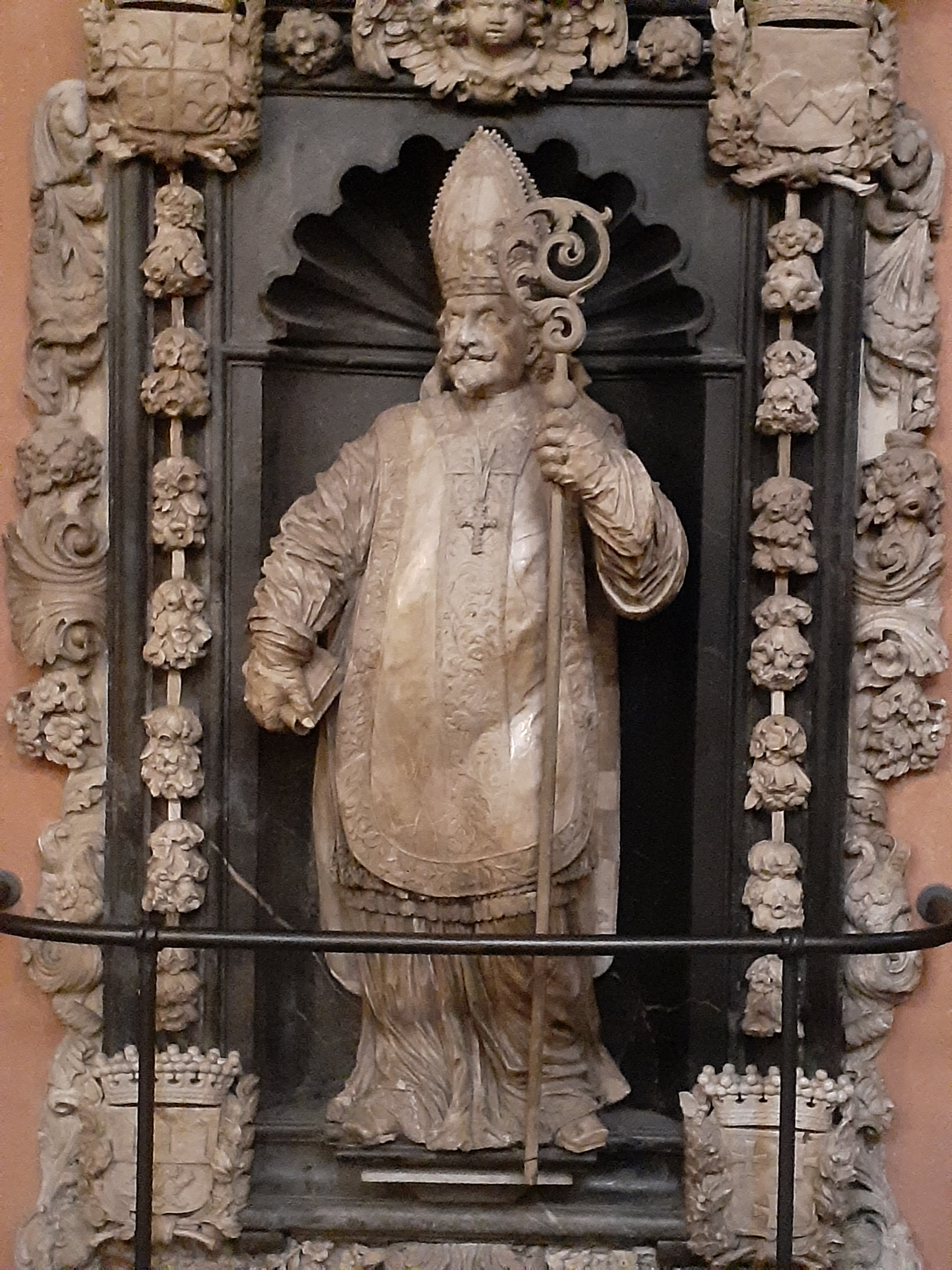
John Charles Franckenstein, Prince-Bishop of Worms (1746–1753)

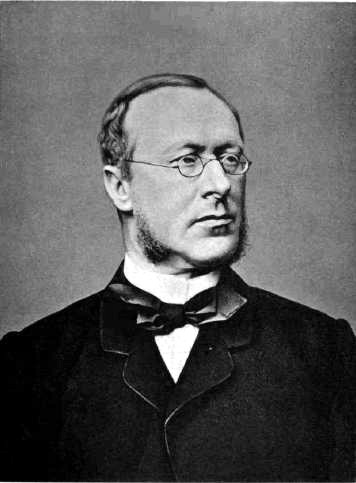
Georg Arbogast Franckenstein, Member of the German Parliament, Chairman of the Bavarian House of Lords

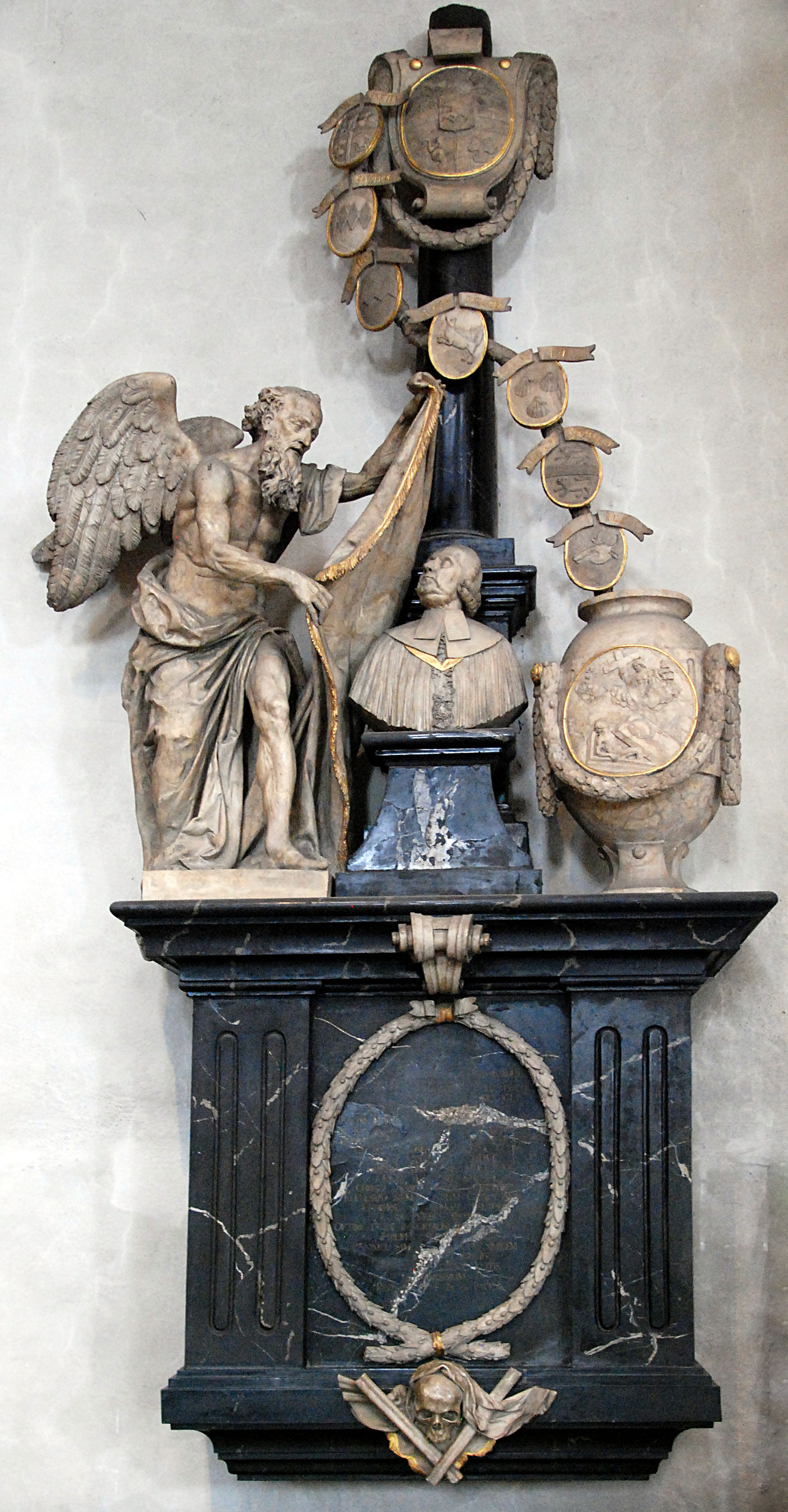
John Philipp Franckenstein, Canon of the cathedral chapter of Bamberg and Würzburg, Ambassador at the Imperial Court in Vienna

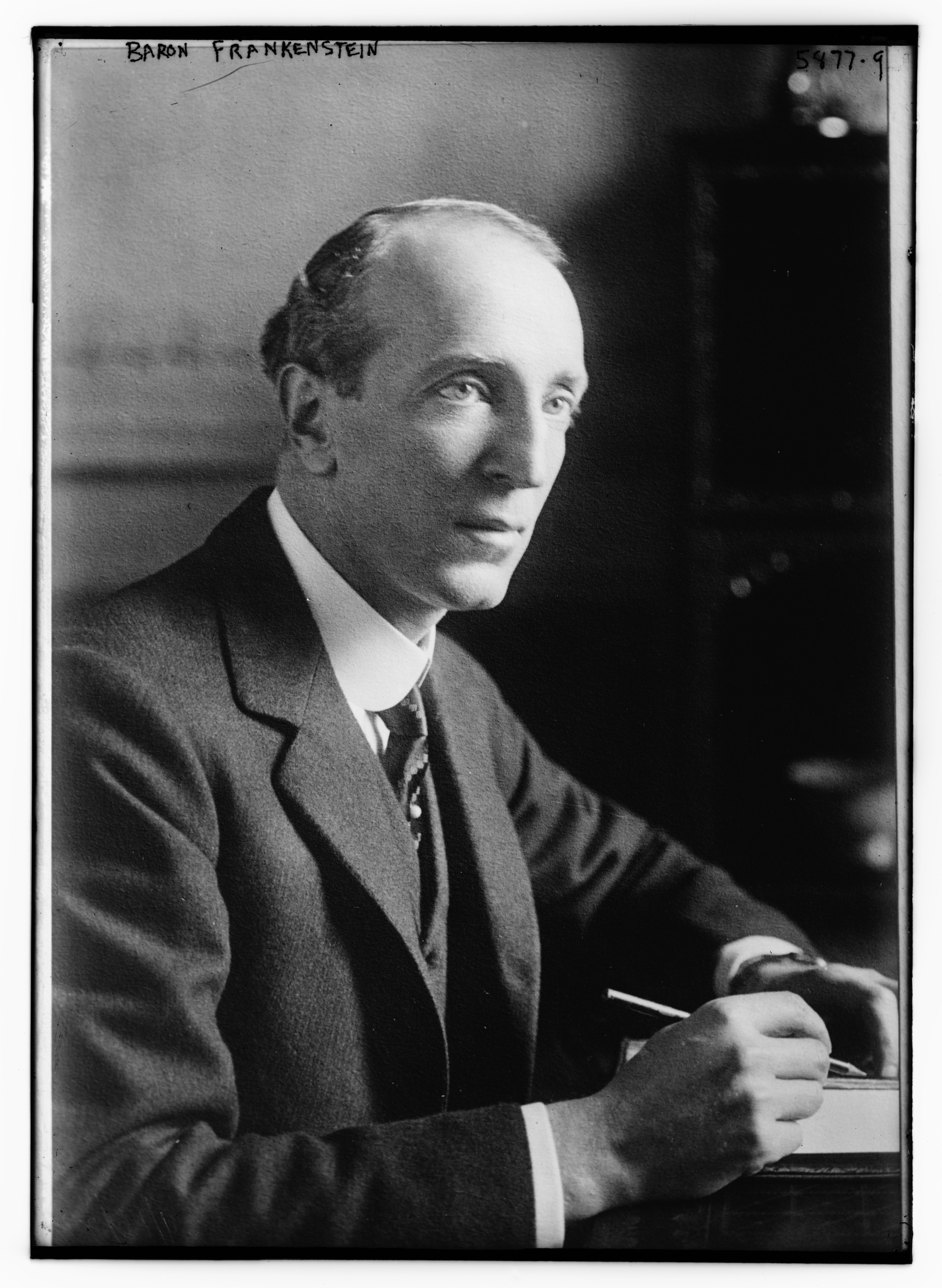
George Franckenstein, Austrian Minister to the Court of St James

== Family tree ==
- Karl Arbogast Viscount Franckenstein (1798–1845) ∞ Leopoldine Countess Apponyi de Nagy-Appony (1804–1870)
  - Georg Arbogast, Viscount Franckenstein (1825–1890) ∞ Maria Theresia, Princess Oettingen-Wallerstein
    - Johann Karl Viscount Franckenstein (1858–1913)
    - Moritz Viscount Franckenstein (1869–1931) ∞ Maria Pia, Countess Stolberg-Stolberg (1870–1913)
      - Anna Maria (1896–1998)
      - Georg Viscount Franckenstein (1898–1965) ∞ Karoline, Princess Schönburg-Hartenstein (1898–1985)
      - Marie Leopoldine (1901–1970)
      - Heinrich (1902–1991) ∞ 1953 Theresa Maria Josefa Riccabona von Reichenfels (b. 1909)
      - Marie Elisabeth (1905–1919)
  - Heinrich Viscount Franckenstein (1826–1883) ∞ Helene Countess Arco-Zinneberg (1837–1897)
    - Konrad Viscount Franckenstein (1875–1938) ∞ Anna Maria Countess Esterházy-Galantha (1886–1968)
      - Heinrich Maria Viscount Franckenstein (1908–1982) ∞ Maria Pia Baroness Fürstenberg, Countess Deroy (1905–1961)
      - Joseph Viscount Franckenstein (1910–1963) ∞ Kay Boyle (1902–1992)
      - Ludwig Maria von und zu Franckenstein (1914–1945) ∞ Dorothea von Kobbe (1921–1954)
  - Karl Baron Franckenstein (1831–1898) ∞ Elma Countess Schönborn-Wiesentheid
    - Leopoldine Baroness Franckenstein (1874–1918) ∞ Gustav Hermann von Passavant
    - Clemens Baron Franckenstein (1875–1942) ∞ Maria Nezádal
    - Georg Baron Franckenstein (1878–1953) ∞ Editha King (1916–1953)
      - Clement Baron Franckenstein (1944–2019)

== Coat of arms ==
Divided and split two times coated with a golden heartshield, therein an oblique red battle axe on Gold.

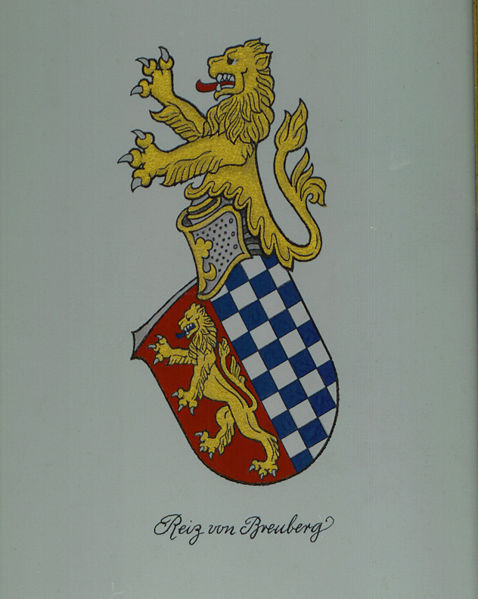
First coat of arms Lords of Breuberg

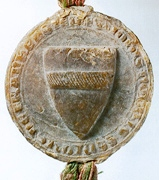
Breuberg Seal from 1291

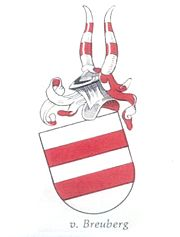
Crest of the Breuberg lordship around 1330–1350

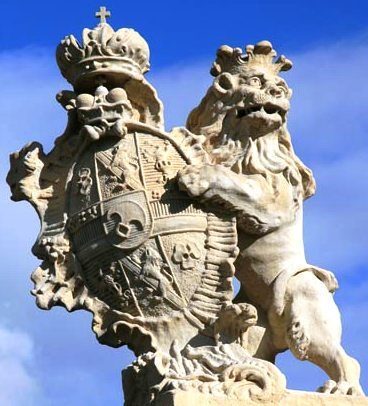
Franckenstein-crest Ullstadt Castle

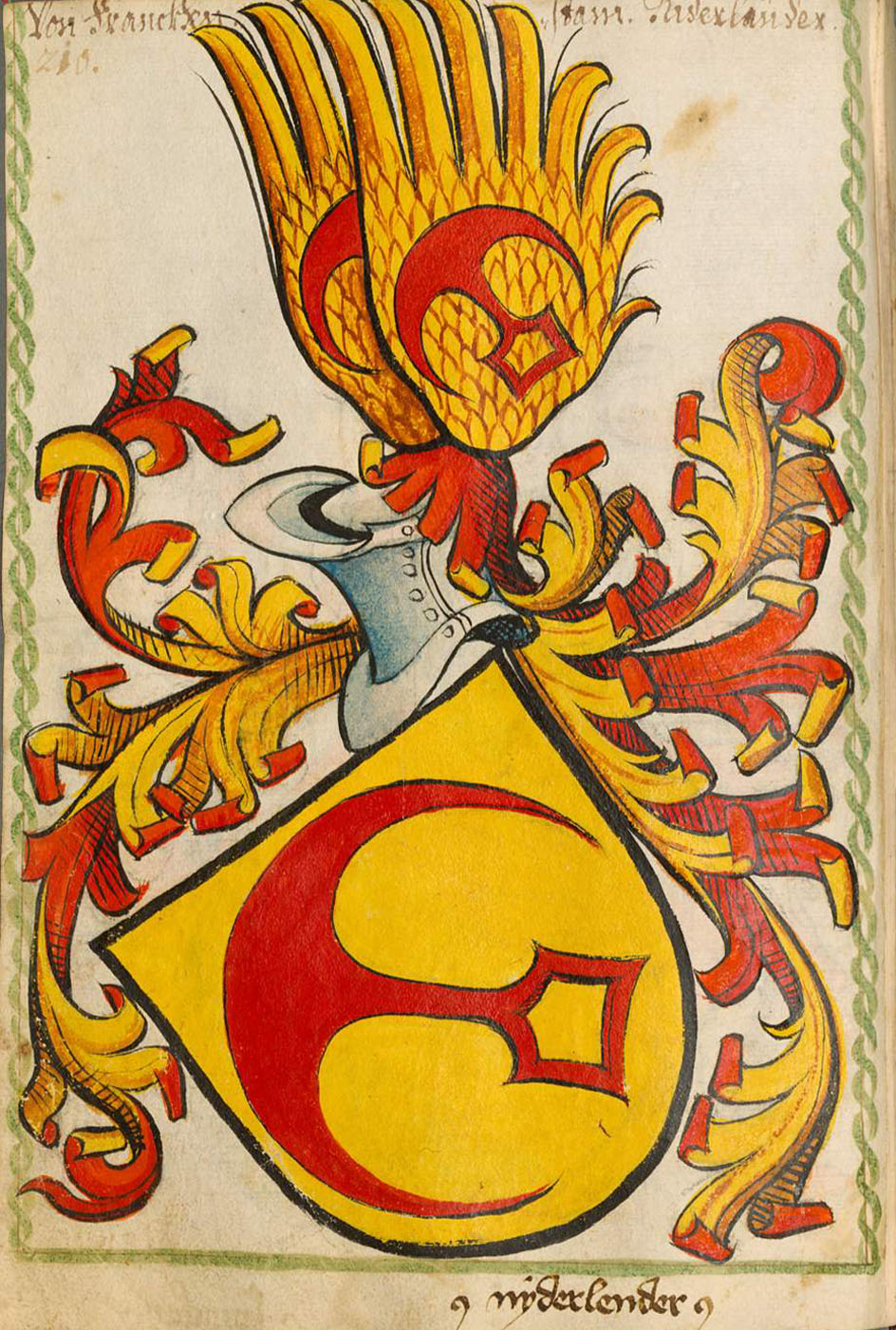
Franckenstein- coat of armorial bearings from the Scheibler armorial

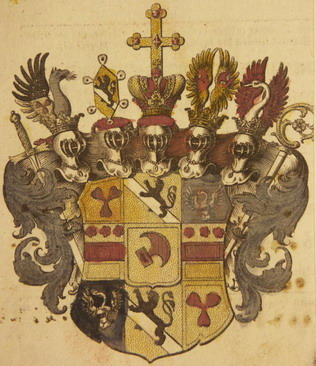
Franckenstein Emblem of Princebishop Philipp Anton of Bamberg

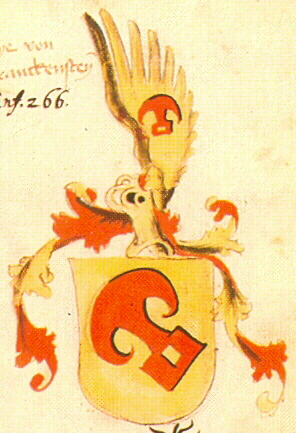
Franckenstein coat of arms in the Ingeram Codex

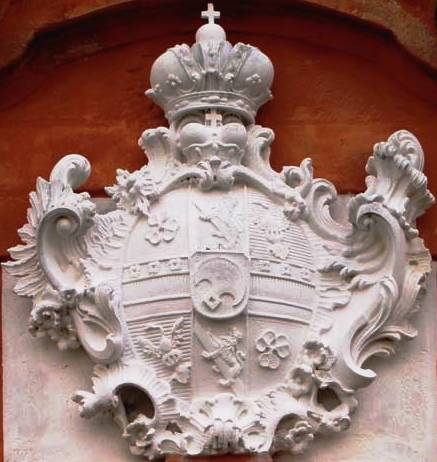
Franckenstein-coat of arms Seehof castle

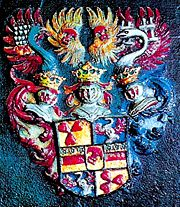
Franckenstein-Coat of arms in the guildhall of Darmstadt-Eberstadt

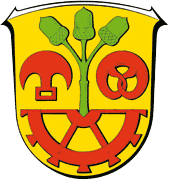
Coat of arms municipality of Mühltal

Coat of arms municipality of Modautal

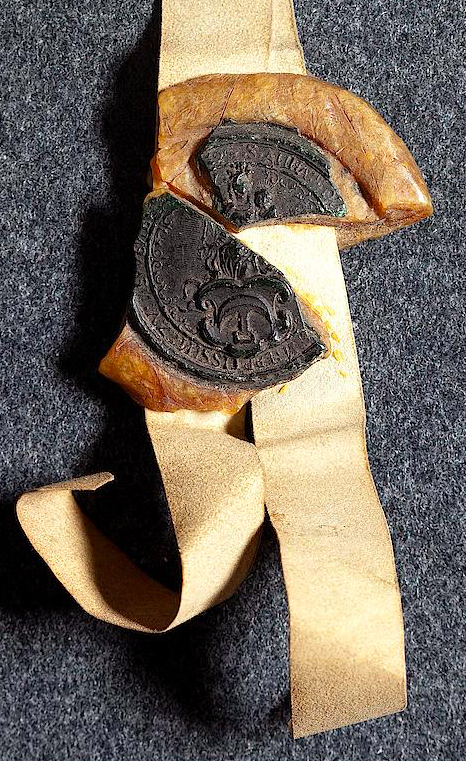
Coat of arms of Anna Frankenstein, Abbess of Neuburg

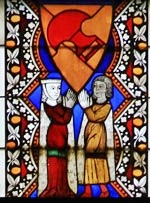
Franckenstein church window at St. Catherine in Oppenheim, 1450

Bobstadt municipality crest

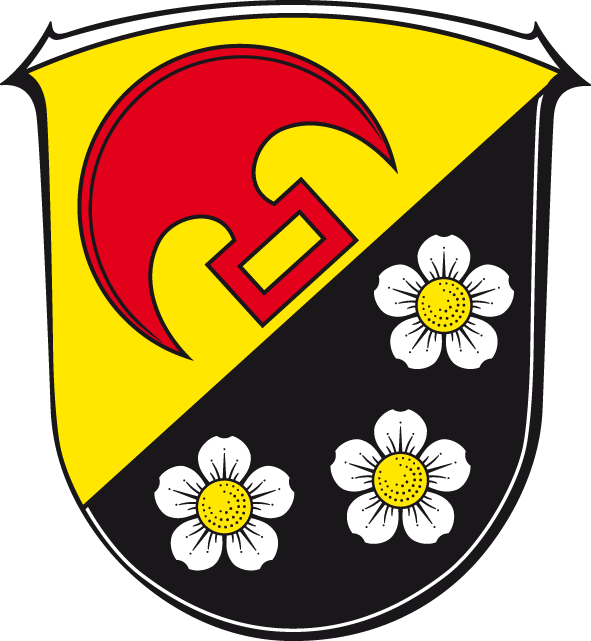
Friedberg-Ockstadt municipality crest

== Building work by the Frankenstein family ==
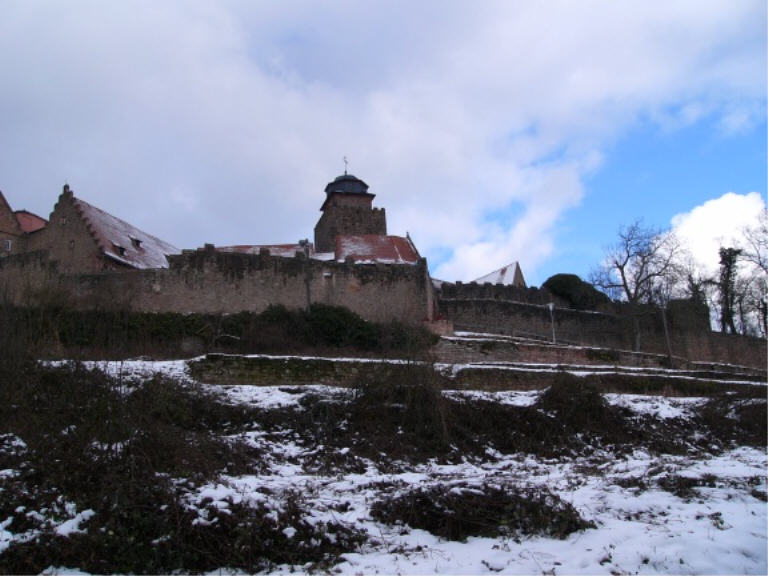
Breuberg Castle, 12th century

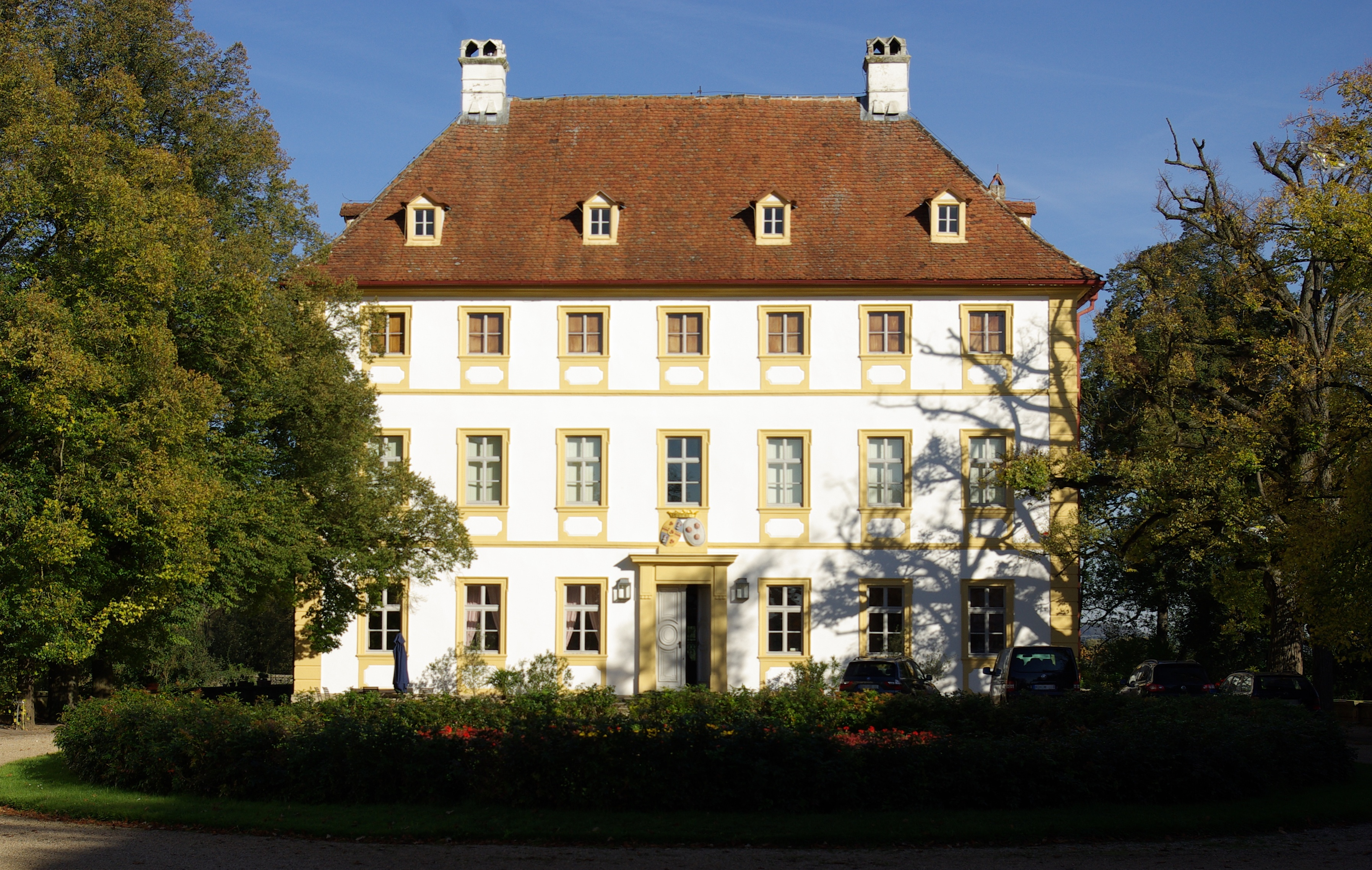
Ullstadt Castle, 17th century

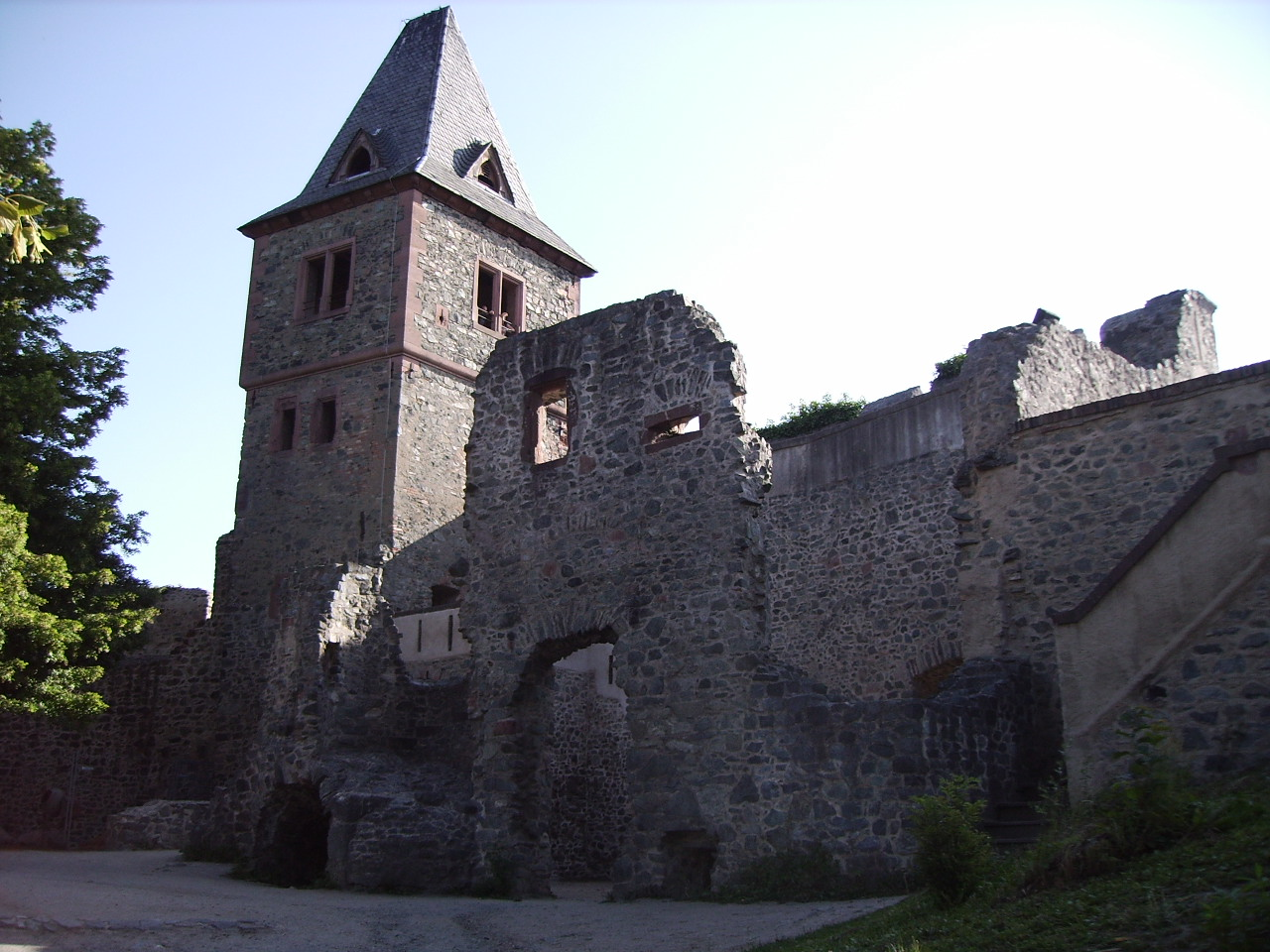
Frankenstein Castle, 13th century

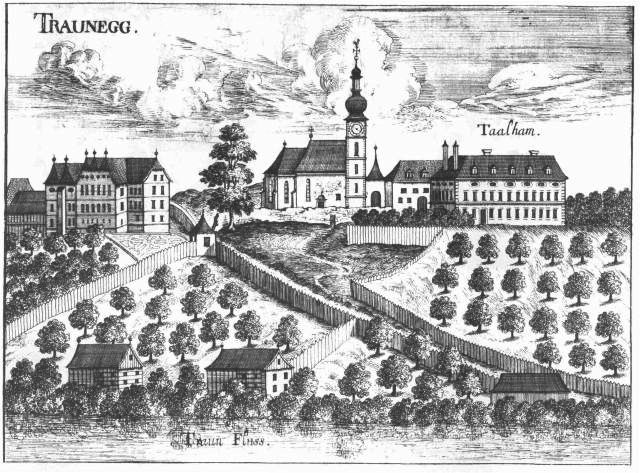
Traunegg Palace, 19th century

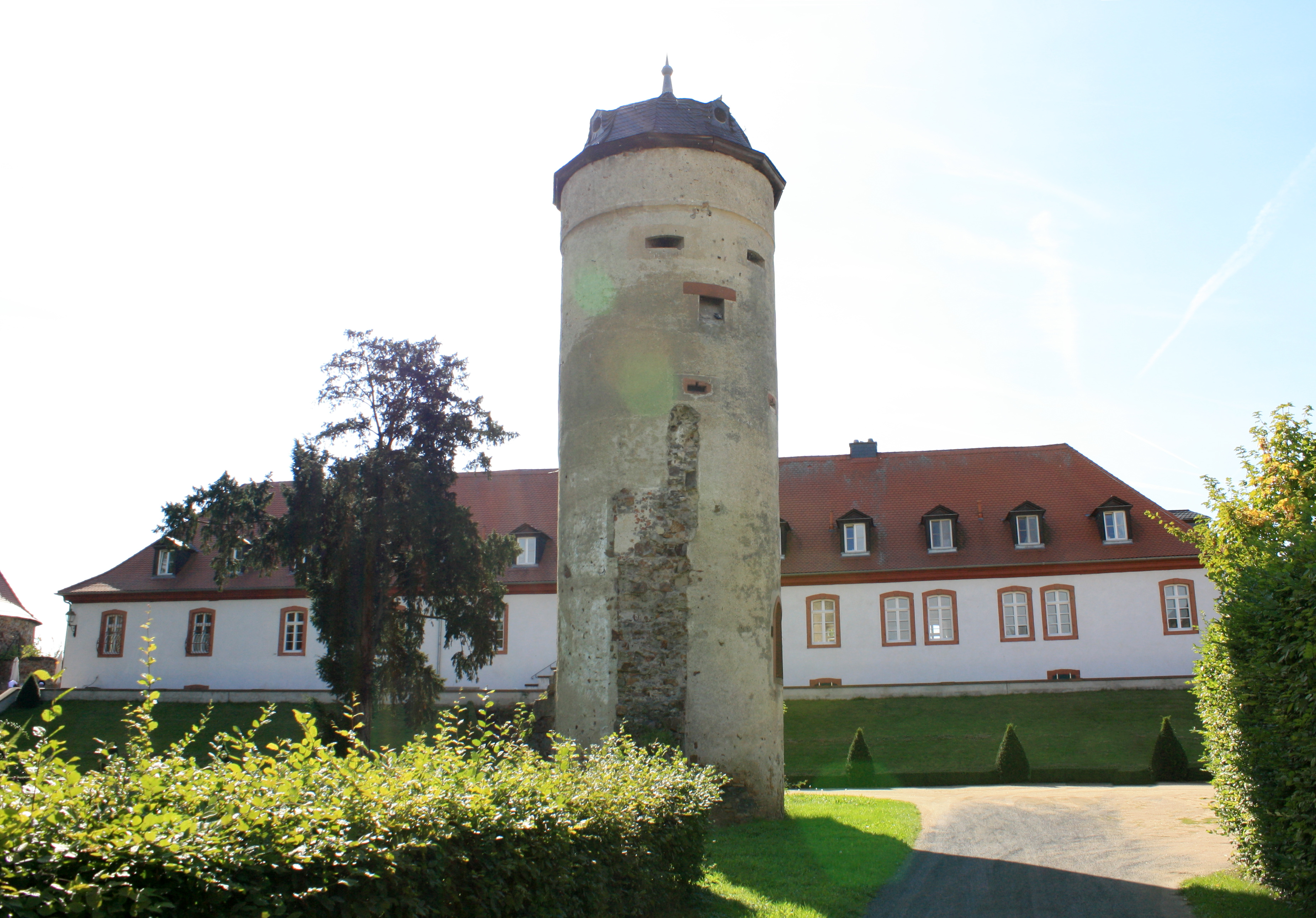
Ockstadt Castle

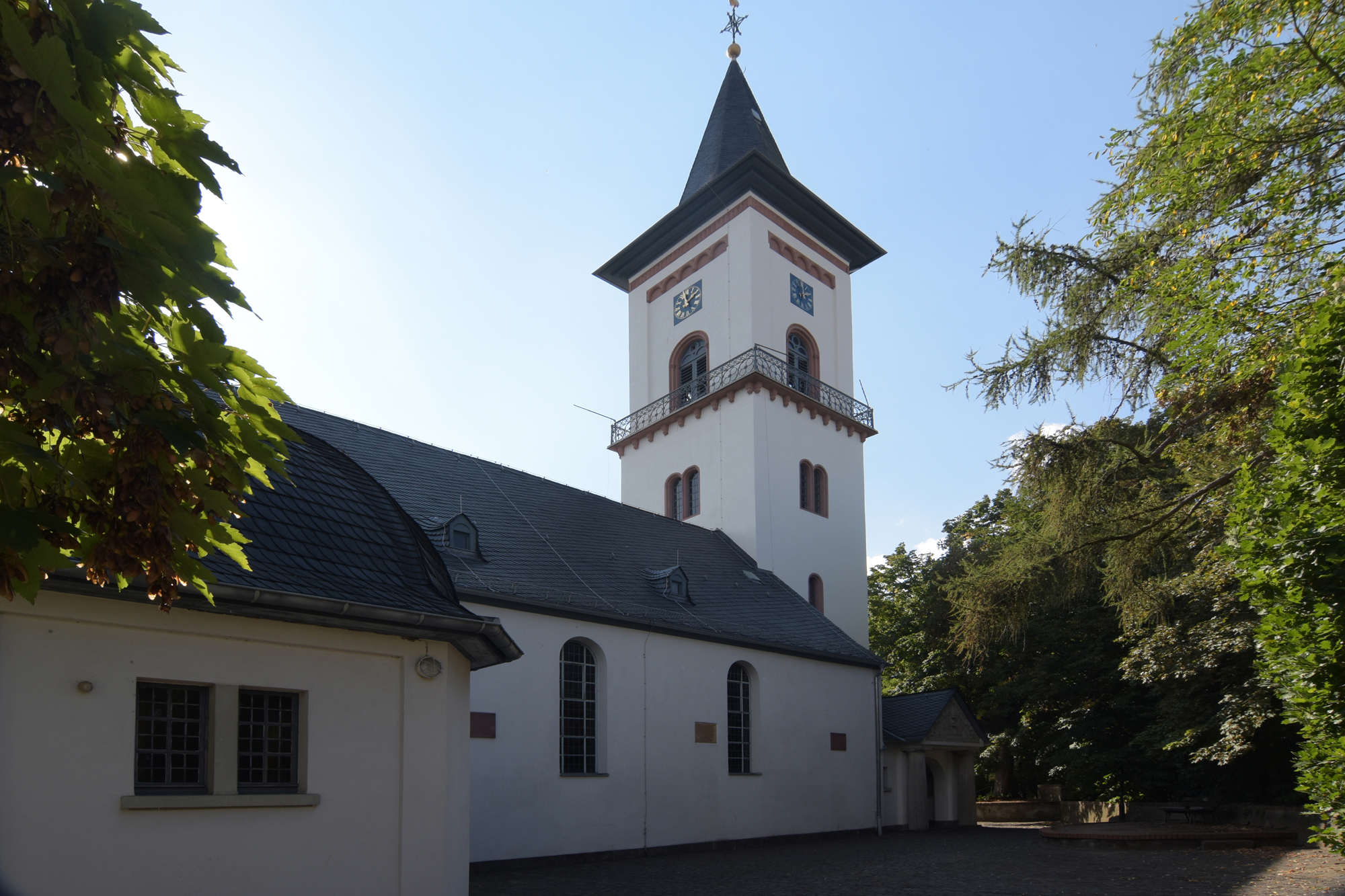
Eberstadt Church, 1260

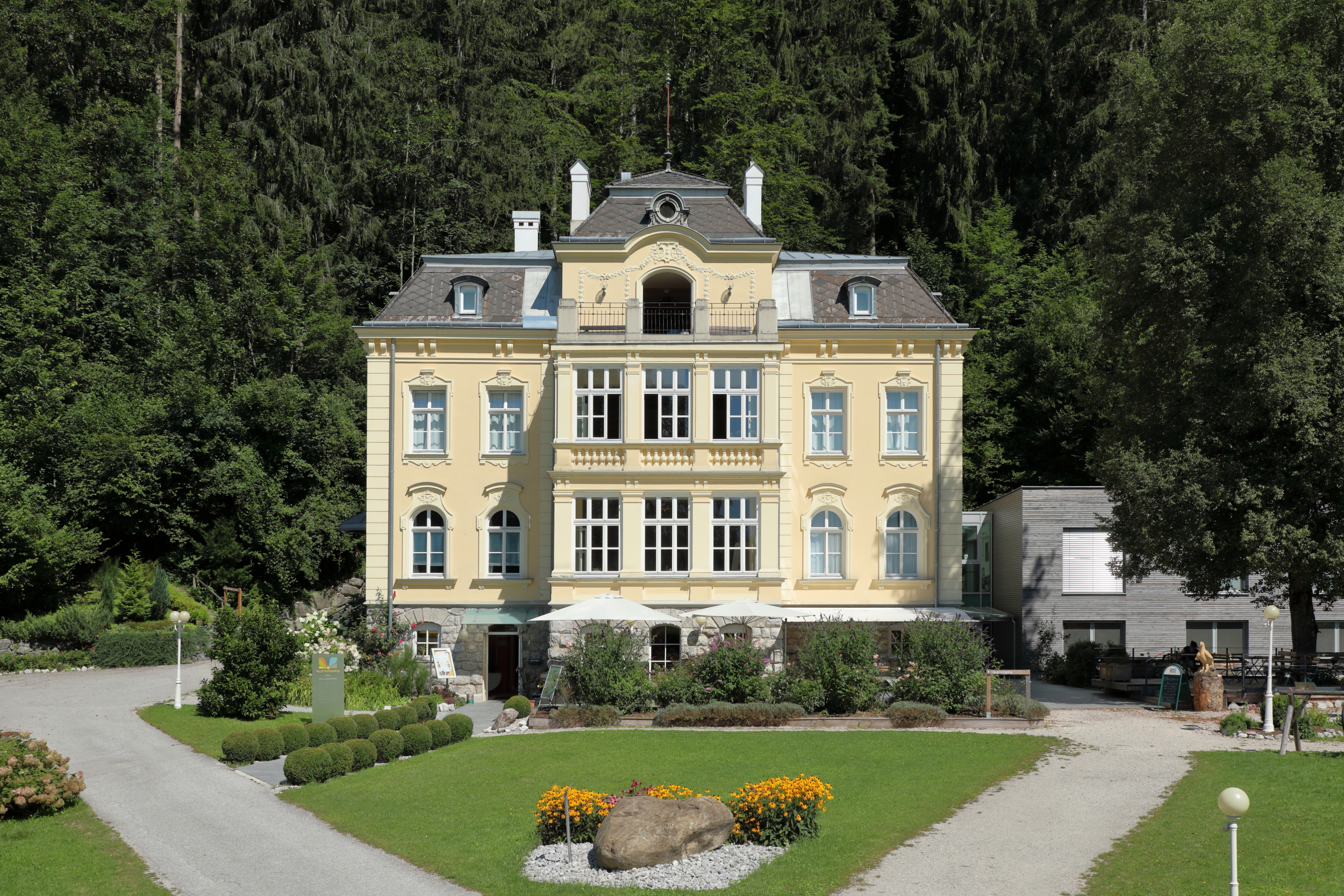
Villa Franckenstein in Windischgarsten, 19th century

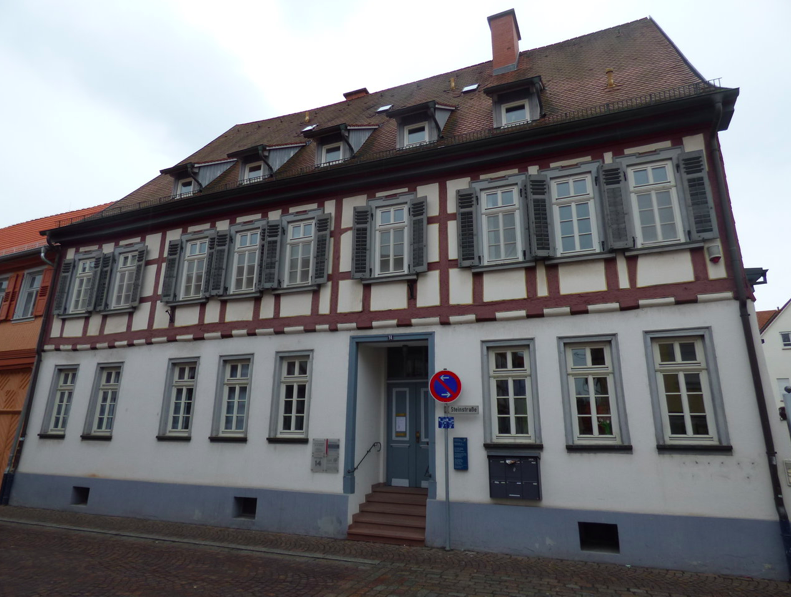
Frankenstein Residence in Dieburg

== Literature ==
- Karl O. von Aretin: Franckenstein Eine politische Karriere zwischen Bismarck und Ludwig II.. Klett-Cotta, Stuttgart 2003, ISBN 3-608-94286-6.
- J. Friedrich Battenberg: Roßdorf in vormoderner Zeit. Alltag und Konfliktkultur einer hessischen Landgemeinde im 17. und 18. Jahrhundert. In: Archiv für hessische Geschichte und Altertumskunde, Bd. N.F. 60 (2002), ISSN 0066-636X, S. 29–60
- Roman Fischer: Findbuch zum Bestand Frankensteinische Lehenurkunden 1251–1812. Kramer, Frankfurt am Main 1992, ISBN 3-7829-0433-8
- Georg von Franckenstein: Zwischen Wien und London Erinnerungen eines österreichischen Diplomaten. Leopold Stocker Verlag, Graz 2005, ISBN 3-7020-1092-0.
- Sir George Franckenstein, Facts and features of my life, ISBN 978-1118112755.
- Genealogisches Handbuch des Adels Band 27; Freiherrliche Häuser A IV, CA Starke Verlag.
- Genealogisches Handbuch des Adels, Band 61, 1975, Adelslexikon. Starke, Limburg/Lahn
- Walter Scheele: Sagenhafter Franckenstein. Societäts-Verlag, Ulm 2004, ISBN 3-7973-0875-2
- Otto von Waldenfels (Hrsg.): Genealogisches Handbuch des in Bayern immatrikulierten Adels. Verlag Degener, Neustadt an der Aisch.
- Hellmuth Gensicke: Untersuchungen zur Genealogie und Besitzgeschichte der Herren von Eschollbrücken, Weiterstadt, Lützelbach, Breuberg und Frankenstein. In: Hessische historische Forschungen (1963), S.99–115
- Walter Scheele: Burg Franckenstein. Societäts-Verlag, Frankfurt/Main 2001, ISBN 3-7973-0786-1
- Historischer Verein für Hessen, Archiv für hessische Geschichte und Altertumskunde.
- Otto Hupp: Münchener Kalender 1912. Verlagsanstalt München / Regensburg 1912.
- Rudolf Kunz: Dorfordnungen der Herrschaft Franckenstein aus der 2. Hälfte des 16. Jahrhunderts. Sonderdruck aus: Archiv für hessische Geschichte und Altertumskunde. Band 26, Heft 1, 1958
- Wolfgang Weißgerber: Die Herren von Frankenstein und ihre Frauen: Landschaften, Personen, Geschichten. Schlapp, Darmstadt-Eberstadt 2002, ISBN 3-87704-050-0.
- Karl Otmar von Aretin (1961). "Franckenstein, Freiherren von und zu". Neue Deutsche Biographie (in German). Vol. 5. Berlin: Duncker & Humblot. pp. 329–329. (Ottmar Freiherr von Aretin.html full text online).
- Norbert Hierl-Deronco: "Es ist eine Lust zu Bauen". Von Bauherren, Bauleuten und vom Bauen im Barock in Kurbayern, Franken, Rheinland. Krailling 2001, ISBN 3-929884-08-9, S. 133–142

== See also ==
- Lordship of Franckenstein
