= Frankenstein Castle =

Castle in Hesse, Germany

Coordinates: 49°47′35.84″N 8°40′5.58″E

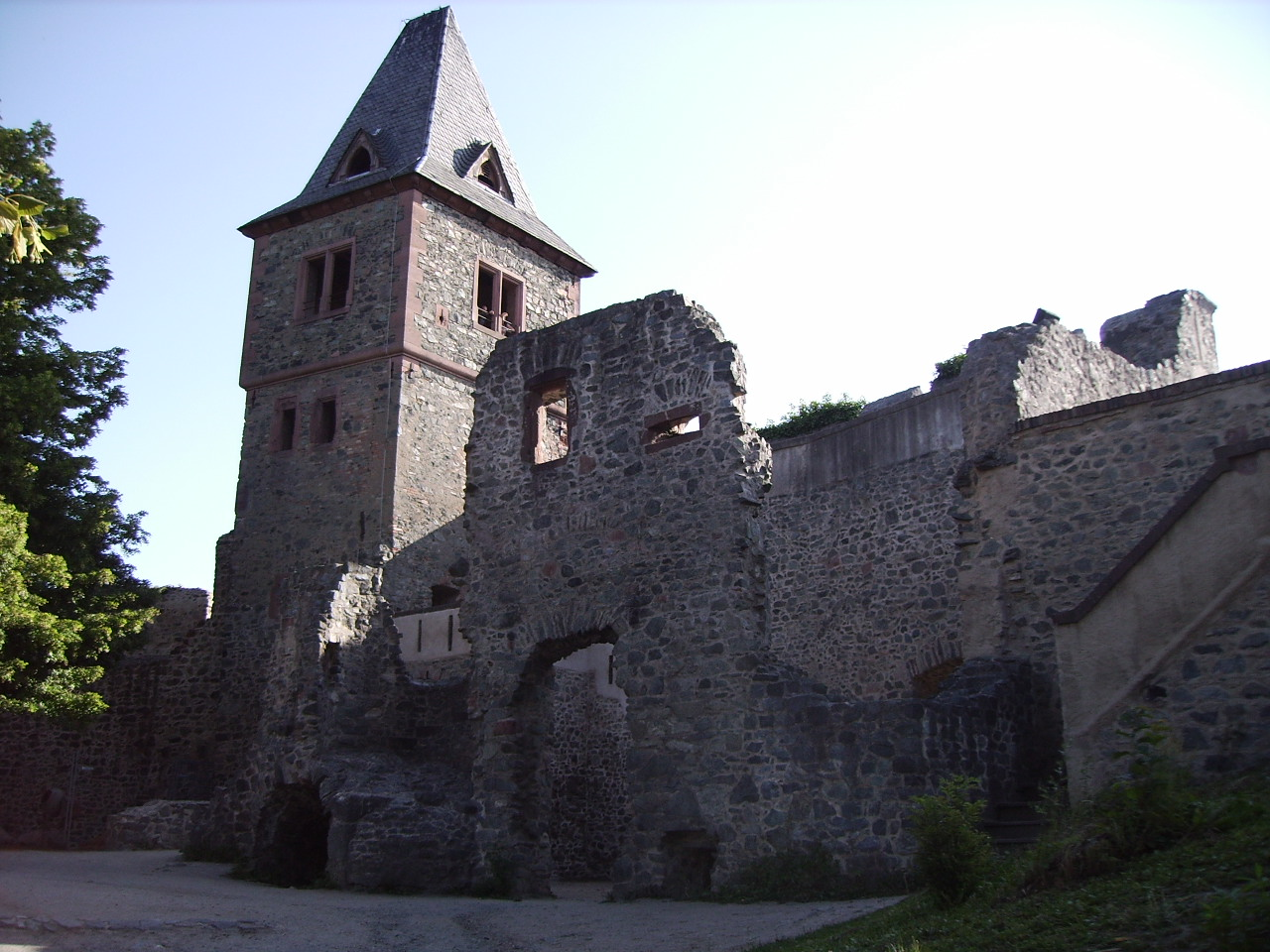
Tower and ruins of Frankenstein Castle

Frankenstein Castle or Castle Frankenstein (German: Burg Frankenstein) is a hilltop castle in the Odenwald overlooking the city of Darmstadt in Germany. This castle may have been an inspiration for Mary Shelley when she wrote her 1818 Gothic novel Frankenstein; or, The Modern Prometheus.

== Location ==
Frankenstein Castle is in southern Hesse, Germany, on the spurs of the Odenwald mountain range at an elevation of 370 m (1,210 ft) close to the southern outskirts of Darmstadt. It is one of many historic castles along the Hessian Bergstraße Route, also famous for its vineyards and its mild climate.

== Meaning of "Frankenstein" ==
Frankenstein is a German name consisting of two words: The Franks are a Germanic tribe and "stein" is the German word for "stone". In the past, the word "stein" also meant "rock". It refers to the rock the castle sits on. The big tribe of the Franks were ruling this region. The word "stein" is common in names of landscapes, places and castles in Germany. Consequently, the term "Frankenstein" is a rather ordinary name for a castle in this region.

== History ==
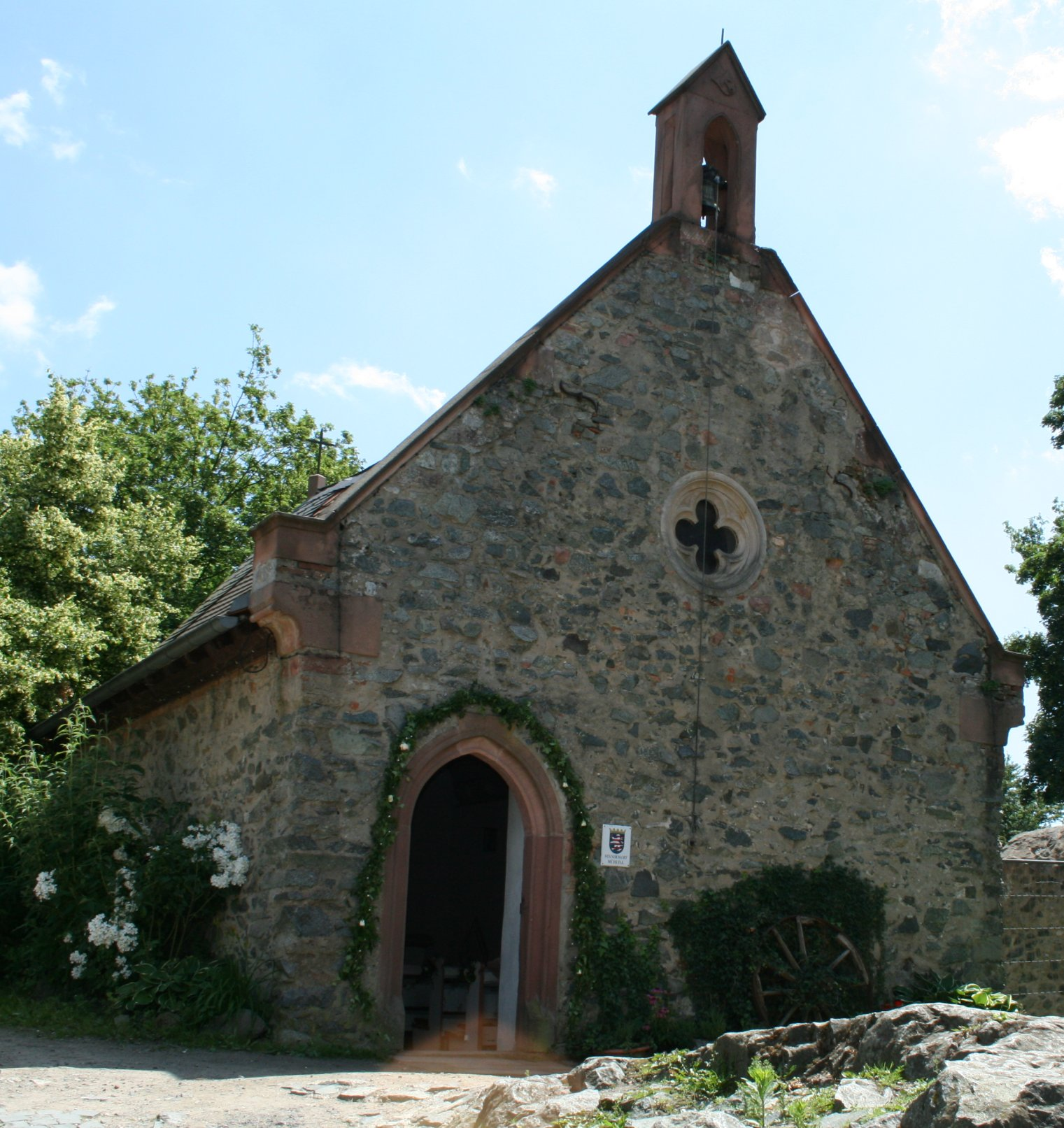
Frankenstein Castle Chapel

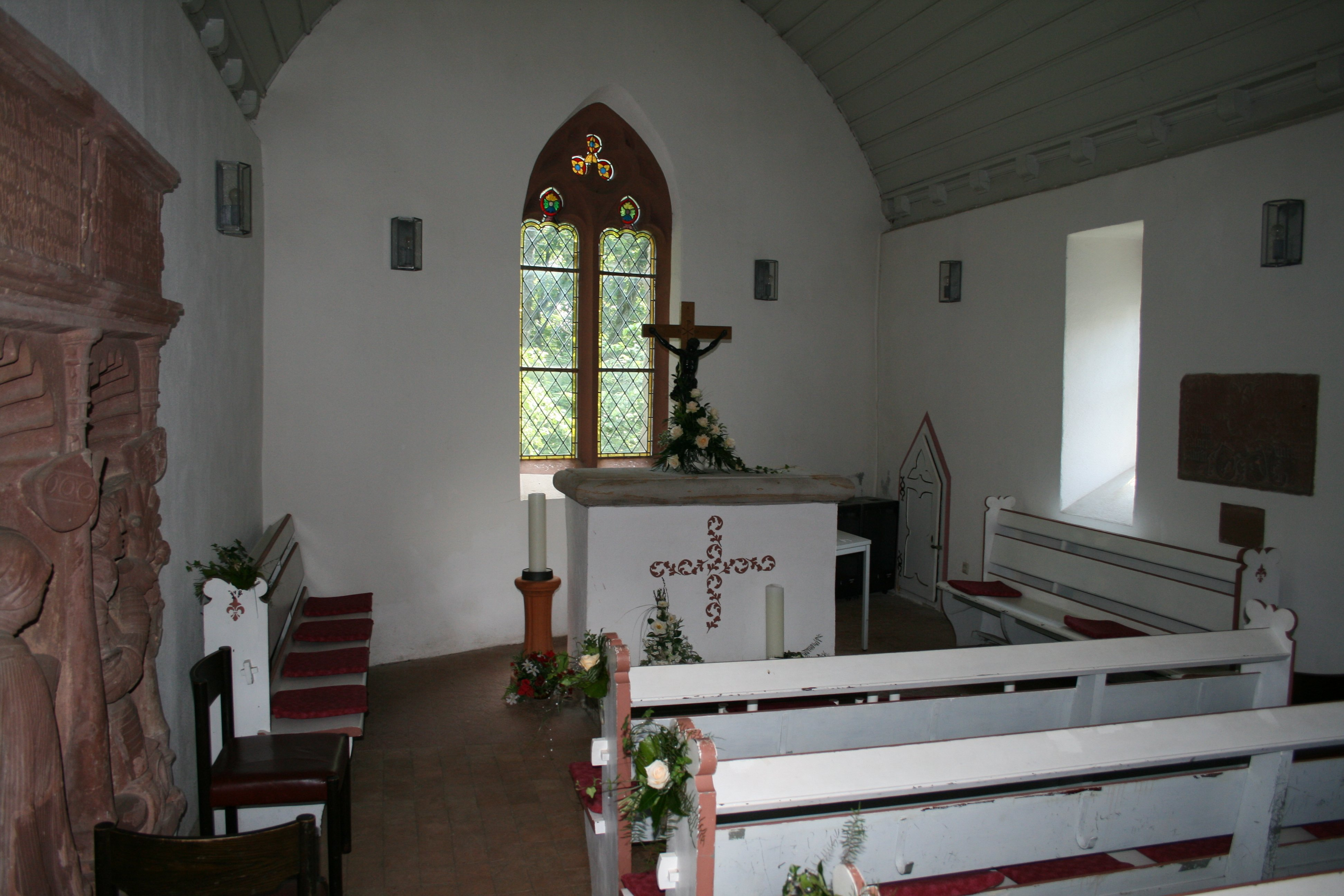
The interior of Frankenstein Castle Chapel

Before 1250, Lord Conrad II Reiz of Breuberg built Frankenstein Castle and thereafter named himself von und zu Frankenstein. The first document proving the existence of the castle in 1252 bears his name. He was the founder of the free imperial Barony of Frankenstein, which was subject only to the jurisdiction of the emperor, with possessions in Nieder-Beerbach, Darmstadt, Ockstadt, Wetterau and Hesse. Additionally the Frankensteins held other possession and sovereignty rights as burgraves in Zwingenberg (Auerbach (Bensheim)), in Darmstadt, Groß-Gerau, Frankfurt am Main and Bensheim. The hill on which the castle stands was probably occupied by another castle from the 11th century, which fell into ruins after Frankenstein Castle was built a short distance away to the northwest. Claims of an even older predecessor upon the hill are widespread, but historically unlikely.

In 1292, the Frankensteins opened the castle to the counts of Katzenelnbogen (County of Katzenelnbogen) and formed an alliance with them.

In 1363, the castle was split into two parts and owned by two different families of the lords and knights of Frankenstein. At the beginning of the 15th century, the castle was enlarged and modernized. The Frankenstein knights became, again, independent of the counts of Katzenelnbogen.

The family were strong opponents of the Reformation, adhering to the Roman Catholic faith and the associated "right of patronage". Following, in addition, territorial conflicts and connected disputes with the Landgraviate of Hesse-Darmstadt, the family head Lord John I decided to sell the lordship to the Landgraves of Hesse-Darmstadt in 1662, after various lawsuits at the Imperial Chamber Court.

The castle was used as a refuge and a hospital afterward, falling into ruins in the 18th century. The two towers that are so distinctive today are an historically inaccurate restoration carried out in the mid-19th century.

On Halloween night in 1952, John Keel sent three American Forces Network reporters to Frankenstein Castle to explore the castle for a live radio broadcast. The reporters were told that a local legend claimed Frankenstein's monster would return to the castle that night. Reporter Carl Nelson investigated the castle's crypt, where Keel had "set up a statue in the middle of the crypt – and rigged it to move and topple" as a prank, terrifying Nelson. Reportedly, frightened radio listeners bombarded the station with calls and military police were dispatched to the castle.

== Legends and myths ==
A number of folktales and myths exist about Frankenstein Castle.

=== Alchemist Dippel, Mary Shelley and the monster ===
In 1673, Johann Konrad Dippel was born in the castle, where he was later engaged as a professional alchemist. It is suggested that Dippel influenced Mary Shelley's fantasy when she wrote her novel Frankenstein; or, The Modern Prometheus, though there is no mention of the castle in Shelley's journals from the time. However, it is known that in 1814, prior to writing the famous novel, Shelley took a journey on the river Rhine. She spent a few hours in the town of Gernsheim, which is located about 16 kilometres (10 miles) from the castle. Several nonfiction books on the life of Mary Shelley claim Dippel as a possible influence.

Dippel created an animal oil known as Dippel's Oil which was supposed to be equivalent to the "elixir of life". Dippel attempted to purchase Castle Frankenstein in exchange for his elixir formula, which he claimed he had recently discovered; the offer was turned down. There are also rumours that during his stay at Frankenstein Castle, Dippel practiced not only alchemy but also anatomy and may have performed experiments on dead bodies that he exhumed. There are rumours that he dug up bodies and performed medical experiments on them at the castle and that a local cleric would have warned his parish that Dippel had created a monster that was brought to life by a bolt of lightning. (The use of lightning to bring Frankenstein's monster to life comes from the 1931 film and isn't in the novel.) There are local people who still claim today that this actually happened and that this tale was related to Shelley's stepmother by the Brothers Grimm, the German ethnologists. However, none of these claims have been proven to this date, and some local researchers doubt any connection between Mary Shelley and Frankenstein Castle.

=== Lord George and the Dragon ===
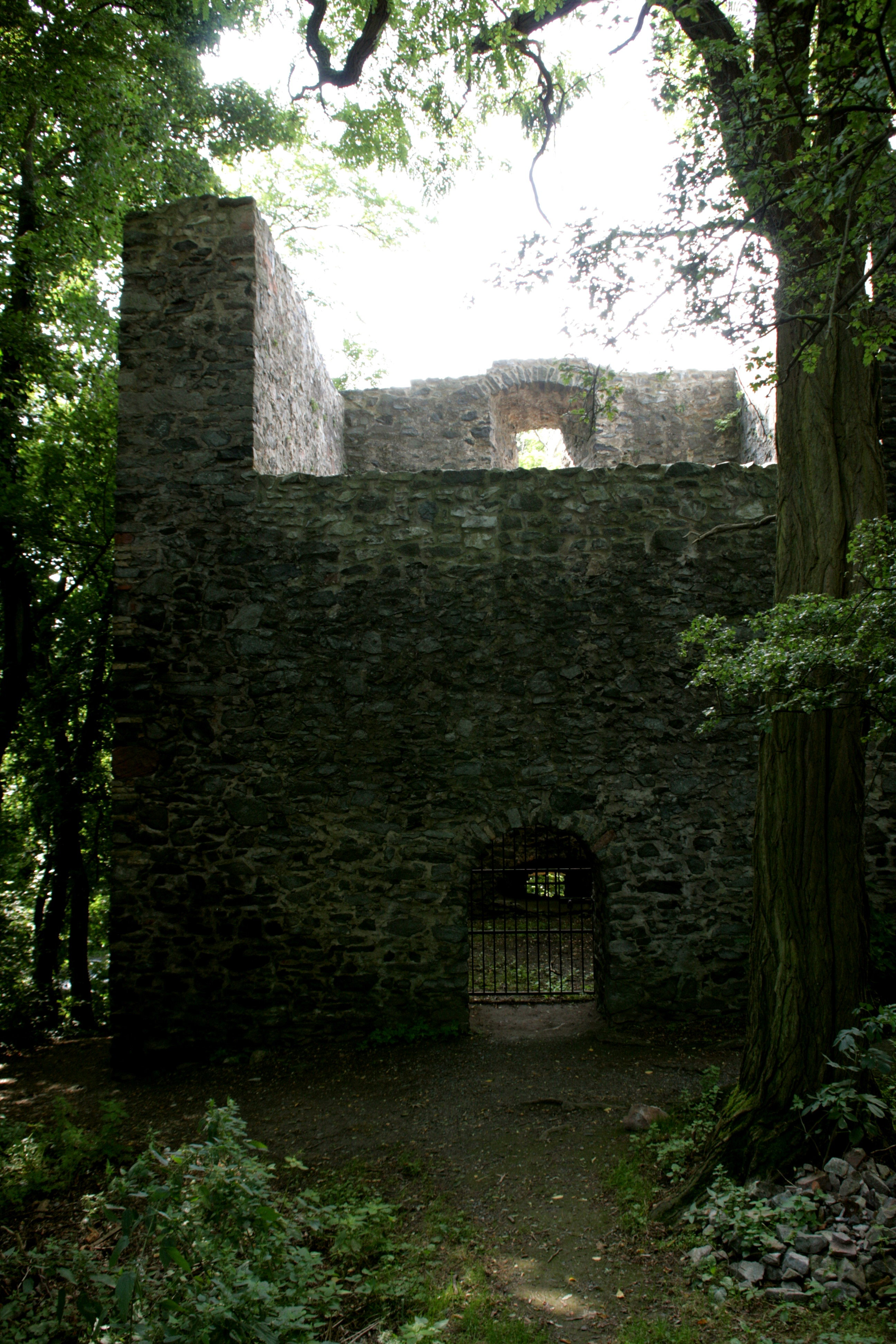
Frankenstein forest

One of the most famous legends is about Lord George and a dragon, by August Nodnagel (1803–1853). It is said that long ago a dangerous dragon lived in the garden near the well at the castle of Burg Frankenstein. The peasants of a neighboring village (Nieder-Beerbach) lived in fear of the mighty dragon. It is said the dragon would creep in at night and eat the villagers and their children in their sleep. One day a knight by the name of Lord George rode into town. The townsfolk were desperate; seeing a brave knight gave them hope, and they poured out their troubles and sorrows as he promised to help them.

The next day, he put on his armor and rode up to the castle, into the garden and straight to the well where the dragon was taking a rest in the sun. Lord George got off his horse and attacked the dragon. The dragon fought for his life, puffed and spewed out fire and steam. Hours passed as the two continued to battle. Finally, just as the knight was about to drop from exhaustion, and just as the dragon was going to drop from exhaustion, the knight plunged his sword into the underbelly of the beast and was victorious. But as the dragon struggled in agony, it coiled its tail with the poisonous spine around the knight's belly and stung. Lord George and the dragon both fell. The villagers were so happy and relieved that the dragon was finally slain they wanted to give the knight a proper, honorable burial. They brought him to the Church of Nieder Beerbach, in the valley on the east side of the castle, and gave him a marvelous tomb. To this day, you can still visit and pay your respects to Lord George, the Knight who slew the Dragon in the 13th century.

=== Gold rush ===
In the 18th century, a gold rush caused some turmoil near Frankenstein Castle. It is believed that a legend and visions of fortunetellers caused local residents to believe that a treasure was hidden near the castle. In 1763, chaotic scenes took place which even an intervention of a priest from the neighbouring village of Nieder-Beerbach could not stop. Even though no gold-filled vaults were ever found, fortune-hunters did not abandon the digging until one Johann Heinrich Drott was killed when his dig collapsed on him. He was given a suicide's burial. In 1770, 1787 and 1788, further attempts were made, but nothing of any value was found. It was then that local authorities banned further gold-digging.

=== Ghost Hunters investigation ===
Frankenstein Castle gained international attention when the SyFy TV-Show Ghost Hunters International made a whole episode about the castle in 2008 (Episode 107). The investigators met with a Frankenstein expert who guided Robb Demarest, Andy Andrews, Brian Harnois and their colleague through the castle and discussed its legends and paranormal sightings. After discussing their personal experiences, the team used audio and video devices for their investigation. Sounds from the chapel and the entrance tower sounded like words and an ultrasonic recorder picked up signals in the chapel. A recorded sound was identified as a phrase in Old German that means "Arbo is here", which was interpreted as "Arbo" probably meaning "Arbogast", the name of a knight of the castle, announcing his presence and claim over the land. A second sound bite was interpreted to mean "come here". The team left Frankenstein Castle convinced that there is some sort of paranormal activity going on.

=== Magnetic phenomena near the castle ===
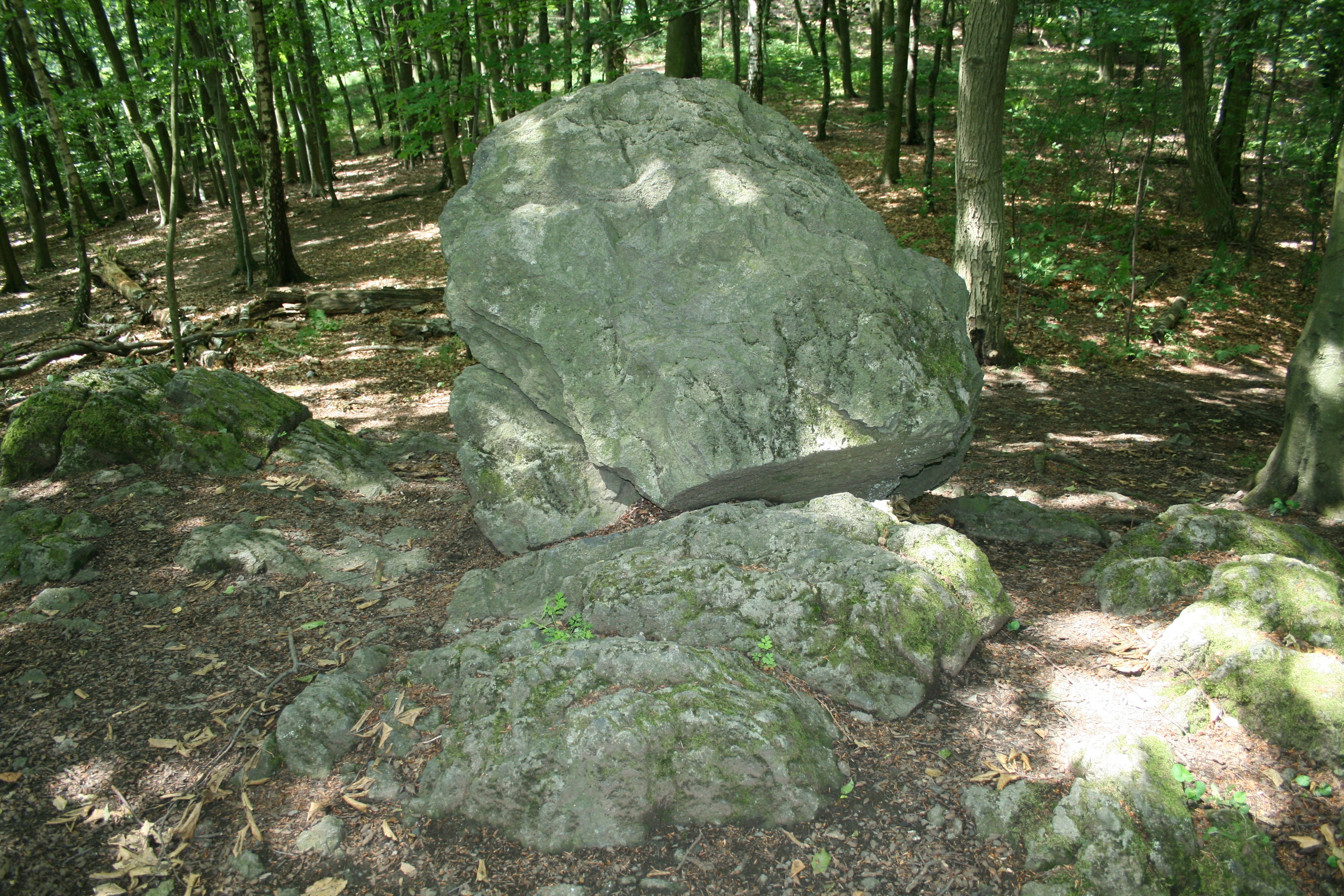
Magnetic stones at Frankenstein

In a remote part of the forest behind Frankenstein Castle on 417 meter high Mount Ilbes, radio operators detected frequent interference, thought to be due to magnetic stone formations of natural origin, though local legends connect the location with witchcraft.

== Current use ==
=== Frankenstein Castle as a tourist attraction ===
Despite being a well-known tourist destination, Frankenstein castle has never been developed into a commercial tourist attraction on a large scale. Local people use the mountain chain on which Frankenstein Castle is located for sport activities like hiking and mountain biking. Normally the castle is open to the public until late at night, on-site parking is possible right at the castle and a restaurant serves food and refreshments. Admission and parking are free except during special occasions like the Halloween festival, when there is a charge for admission. However, there are no further tourist facilities on the site.

=== Wedding office ===
Since the year 2000, the chapel at Frankenstein Castle has been in use as a registry office for civil wedding ceremonies handled by the municipality of Mühltal.

=== Halloween at Frankenstein Castle ===
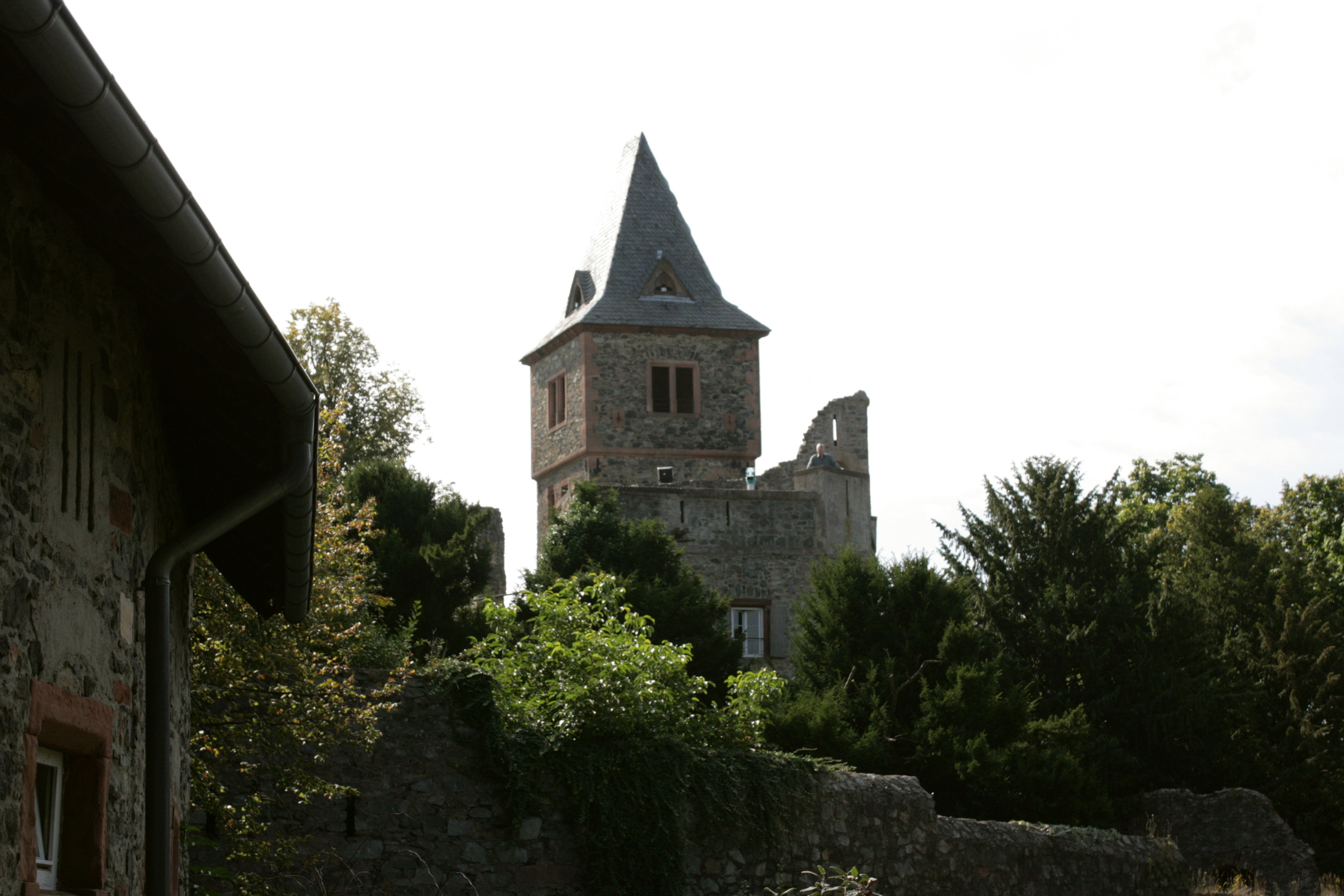
Frankenstein Castle

In 1978, American airmen from the 435th Transportation Squadron stationed at Rhein-Main Air Base started an annual Halloween festival at the castle, which became one of the biggest Halloween festivals in Europe. In 1977, the 440th Signal Battalion organized a 13 km running competition routed along steep forest trails from Cambrai-Fritsch Army Housing Site in Darmstadt to the castle. The Frankenstein Castle Run was held until 2008 when all American forces left Darmstadt. The city of Darmstadt organized a final race in October 2008.

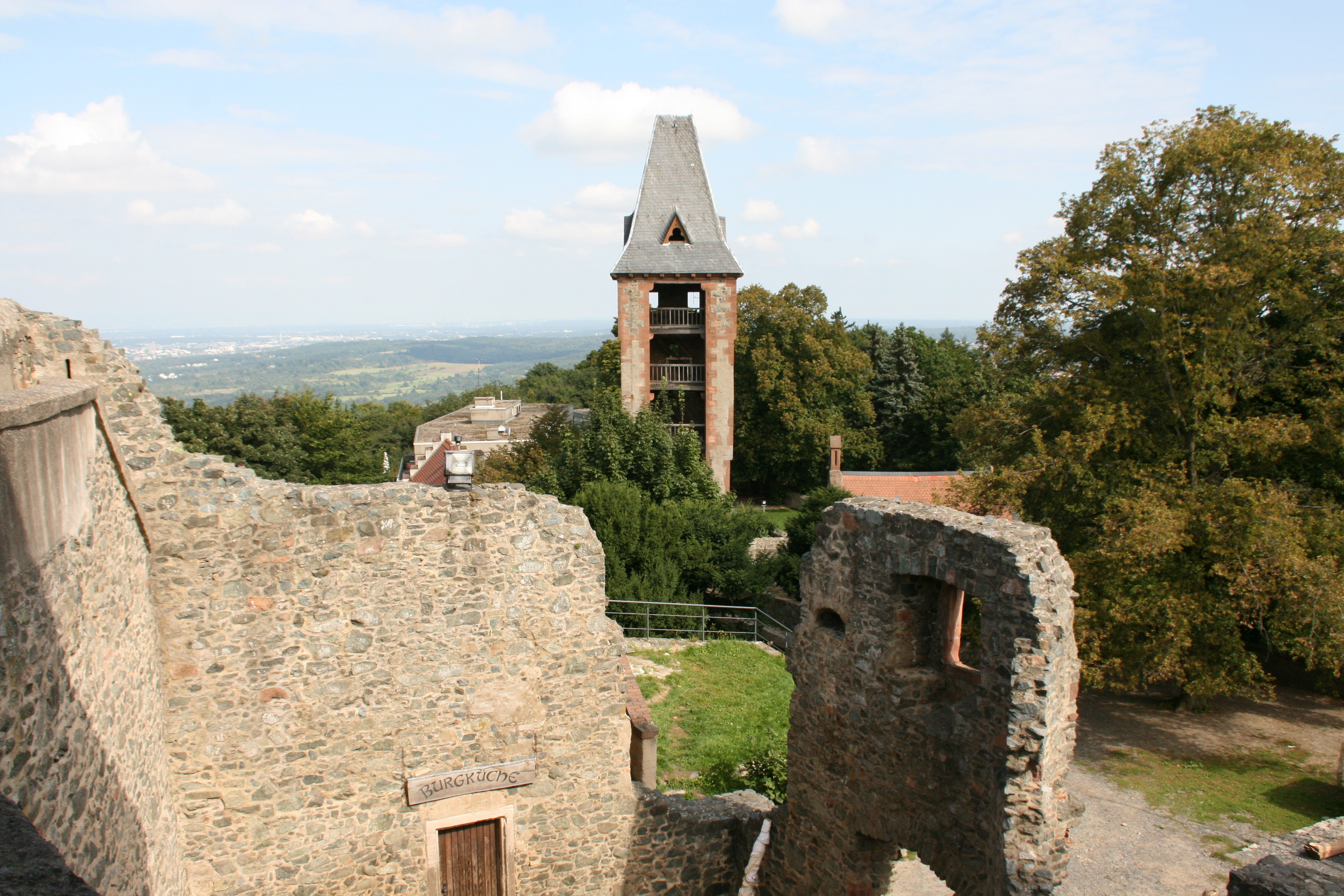
Frankenstein Castle

=== Restaurant ===
A restaurant with a sun terrace, located right below the castle towers, offers regular service as well as special events (e.g., Horror Dinner Nights).

== Travel information ==
The castle is easily accessible via Autobahn A5, exit "Darmstadt-Eberstadt". The site is 35 km (20 mi) from Frankfurt International Airport. The public transport system of Darmstadt serves tram stop "Frankenstein" (located at the foot of the mountain range, a steep 3 km walk from the ruins) with tram lines 1, 6, 7 and 8.

== See also ==
- Lordship of Franckenstein

== Literature ==
- Art. "Frankenstein", in: Hessen, hg. v. Georg W. Sante, Stuttgart 1960 (Handbuch der historischen Stätten Deutschlands, 4. Bd.), p. 117
- Nieder-Beerbach, in: Georg Dehio, Handbuch der Deutschen Kunstdenkmäler: Hessen, bearb. v. Magnus Backes, 1966, p. 622
