= List of the burgraves of Friedberg =

This is a list of the burgraves of Friedberg includes all verifiable burgraves of the Reichsburg Friedberg as the center of the Burgraviate of Friedberg in Hesse.

== Burgraves of Friedberg (1216–1806) ==
- Giselbert (1216)
- B. (1219)
- Eberwin von Kransberg (1220 to c. 1222)
- Winther von Kalsmunt (1223)
- Ludolf (1227–1237)
- Rupert von Carben (1239–1244)
- Eberwin II of Kransberg 1243–1245
- Rupert I von Carben (1239-1247)
- Eberwin von Kransberg (1249/1250)
- Rupert von Carben (1256)
- Franko von Mörlen (1256–1261)
- Wigand von Carben (1262)
- Winter (1262–1265/66)
- Rupert von Carben (1265/66–1280/82)
- Friedrich von Carben (1284–1287)
- Rupert von Carben (1288–1290)
- Friedrich von Carben (1290)
- Dugel von Carben (1294)
- Konrad von Cleen (1298)
- Friedrich Dugel von Carben (1300)
- Eberwin von Kransberg (1302)
- Heinrich von Pfaffenau (1305–1308)
- Wigand von Büches (1310)
- Rupert von Carben (1311)
- Wenzel bzw. Werner von Cleen (1316–1318)
- Rudolf von Sachsenhausen (1333–1342; † 1371)
- Friedrich von Carben (1346)
- Johann von Bellersheim (1351–1361)
- Eberhard Wais von Fauerbach (1365–1385)
- Eberhard Löw von Steinfurth the Elder (1385–1405)
- Johann von Stockheim (1405)
- Hermann Wais von Fauerbach (1456–1459)
- Rudolf von Cleen (1462–1466)
- Johann von Bellersheim (1468–1473/74)
- Ludwig Wais von Fauerbach (1473/74–1483)
- Emmerich von Carben (1483–1502)
- Eberhard Wais von Fauerbach (1504–1526)
- Ludwig Löw von Steinfurth (1526–1532)
- de:Johann Brendel von Homburg the Elder (1532–1569)
- Johann Oyger Brendel von Homburg (1570–1577)
- Johann Eberhard von Cronberg (1577–1617)
- Konrad Löw von Steinfurth (1617–1632)
- Wolfgang Adolf von Carben (1632–1671)
- Hans Eitel Diede zum Fürstenstein (1671–1685)
- Philipp Adolf Rau von Holzhausen (1685–1692)
- Johann zu Schlitz genannt von Götz (1692–1699)
- Adolf Johann Karl von Bettendorf (1699–1705)
- Johann Löw von und zu Steinfurth (1706–1710)
- Johann Erwein von Greiffenclau-Vollrads (1710–1727)
- Hermann XVIII Riedesel of Eisenbach (1727–1745)
- Hans Eitel Diede zum Fürstenstein (1745–1748)
- Ernst Ludwig von Breidenbach zu Breidenstein (1749–1755)
- Franz Heinrich von Dalberg (1755–1776)
- Johann Maria Rudolf Waldbott von und zu Bassenheim (1777–1805)
- Clemens August von Westphalen (1805–1817/18)

== Gallery ==
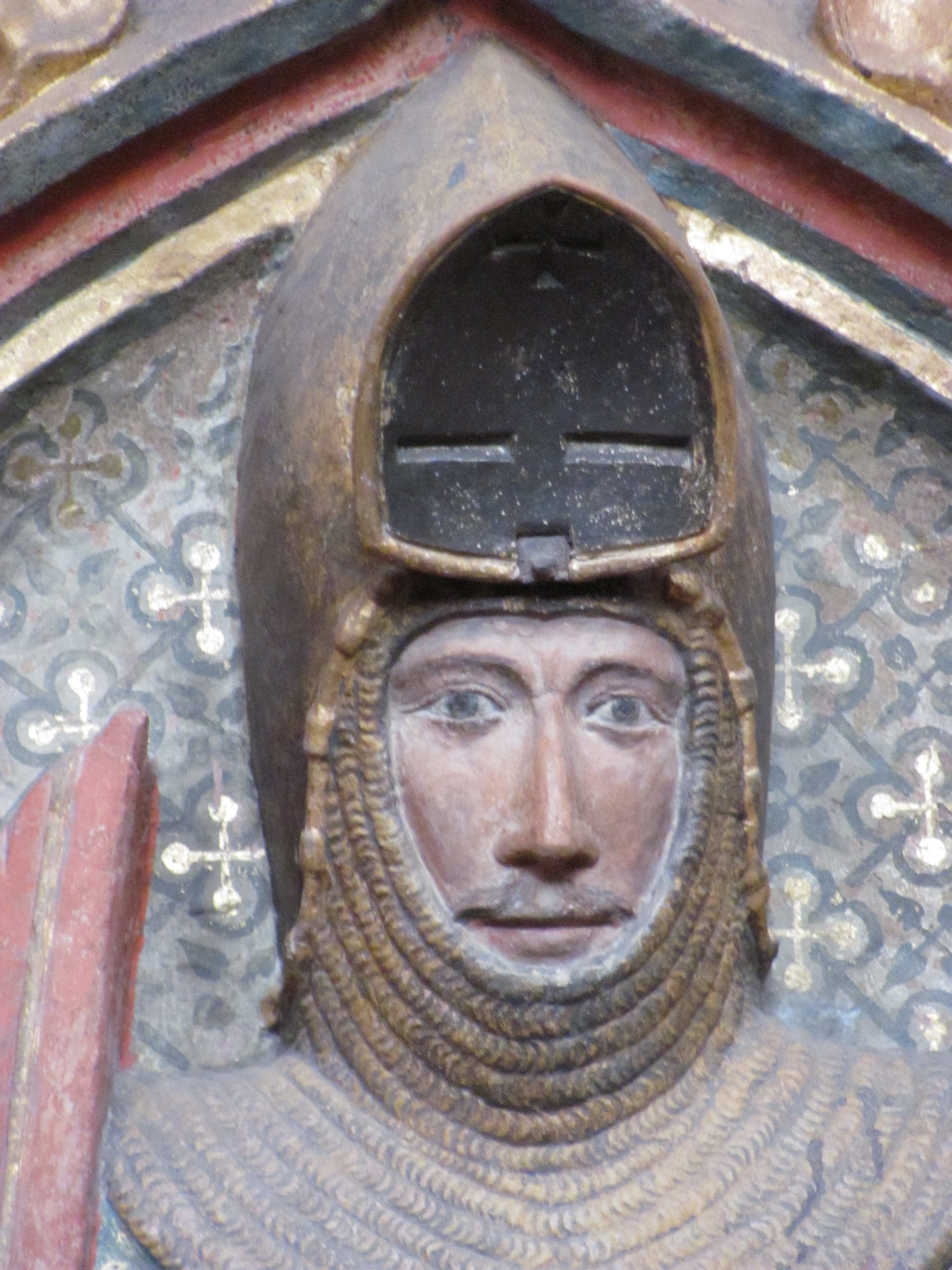
Rudolf von Sachsenhausen, detail from the gravestone in Frankfurt Cathedral

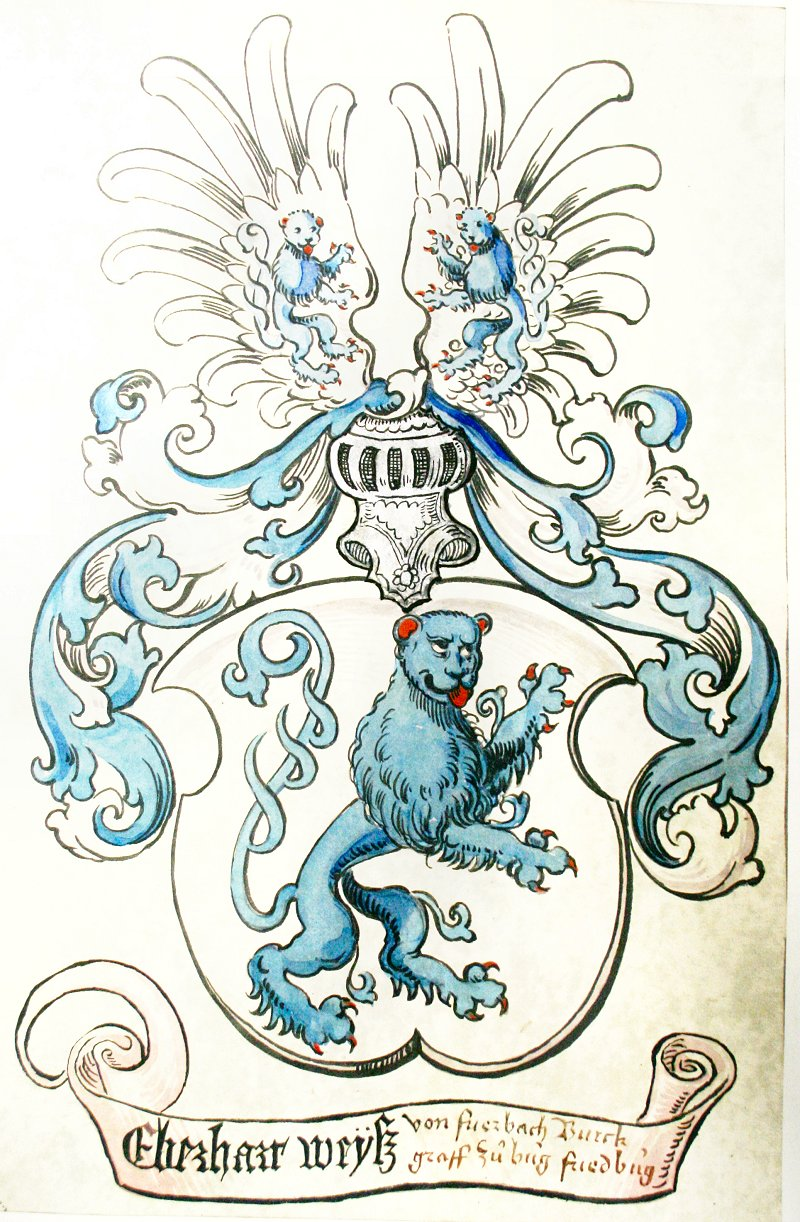
Coat of arms of the burgrave Eberhard Wais von Fauerbach in the land register of the Naumburg monastery

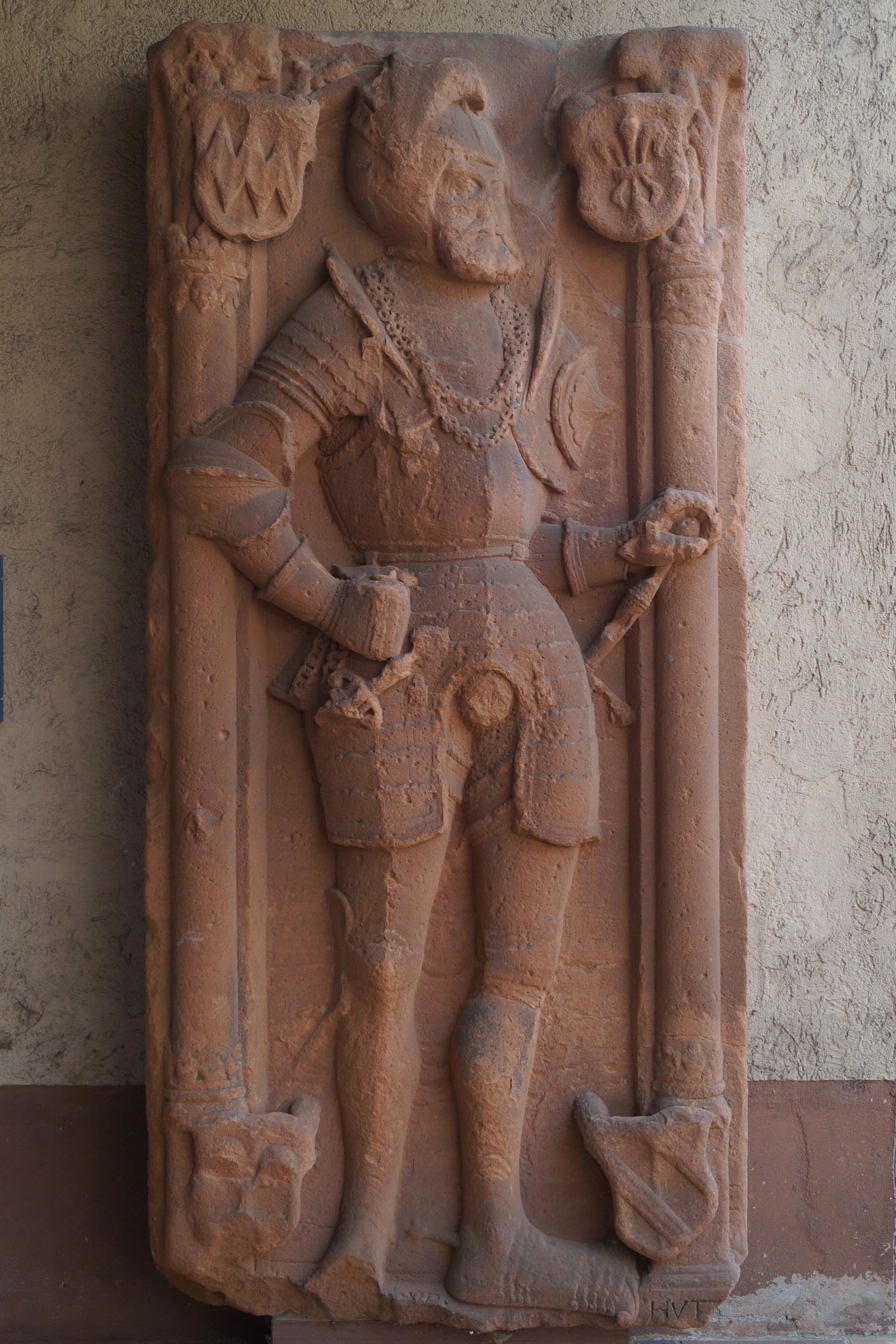
Gravestone of the burgrave Johann Brendel von Homburg (d. 1569) in the courtyard of the Wetterau Museum

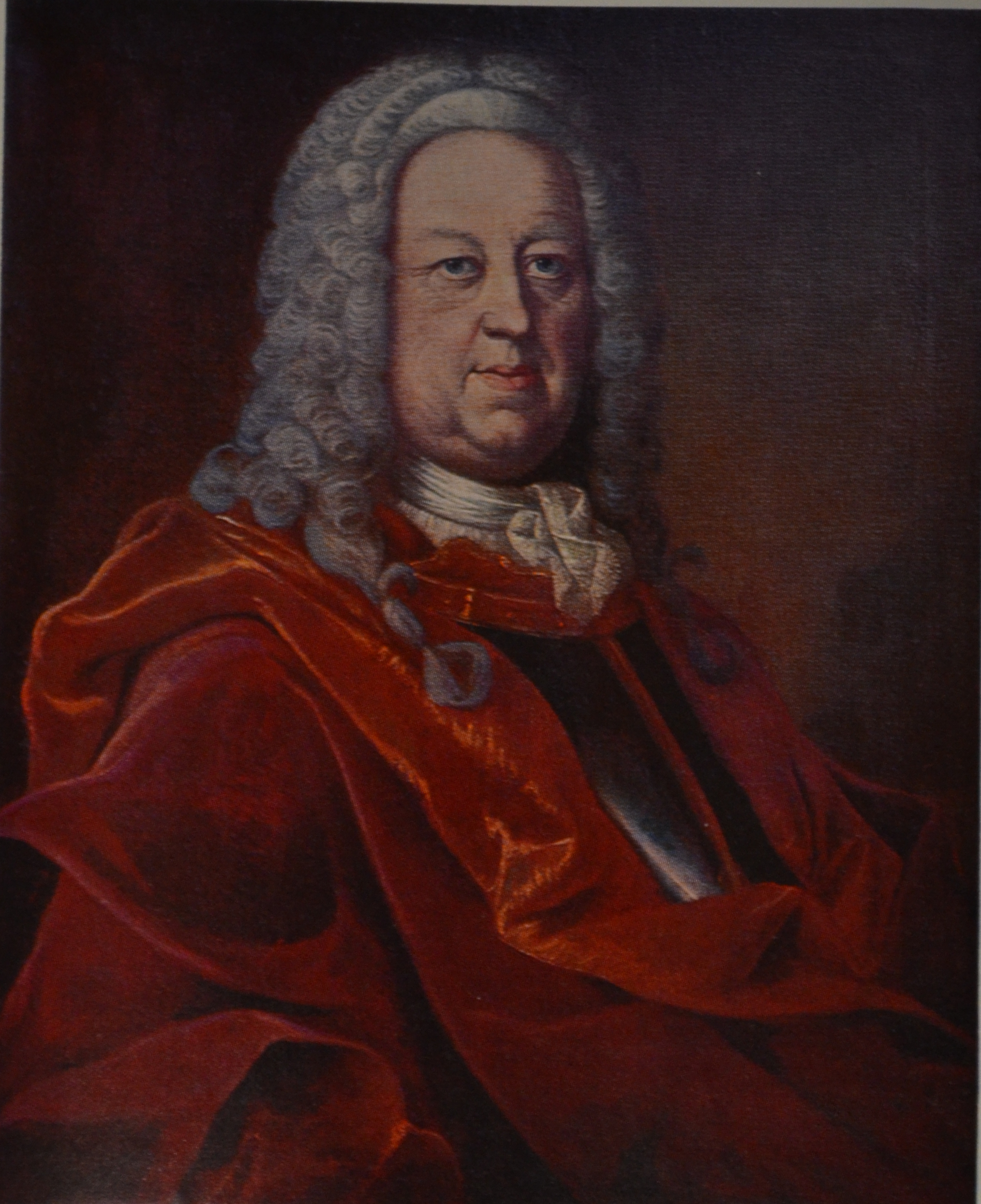
Hermann XVIII Riedesel of Eisenbach

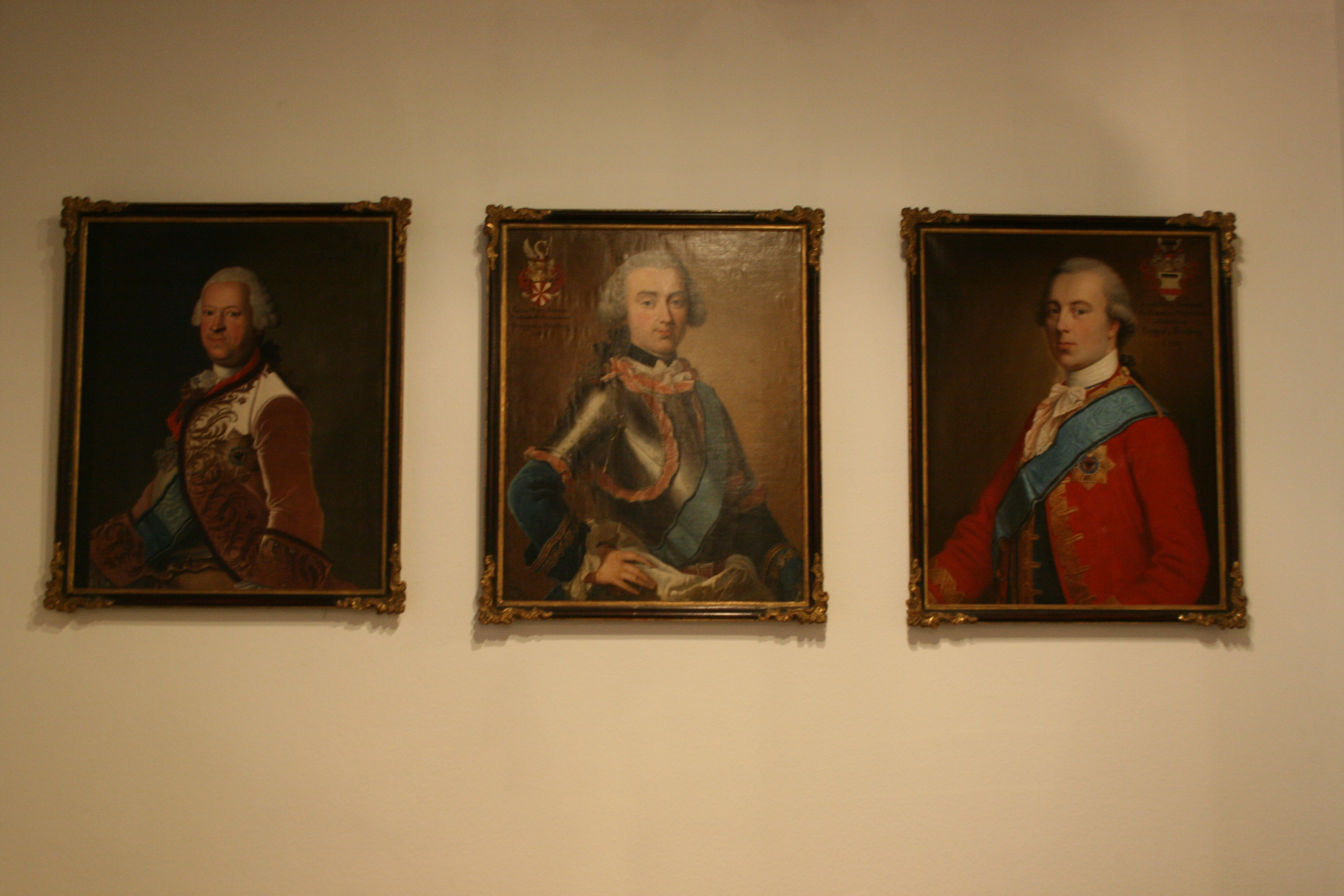
Portraits of the last three burgraves of Friedberg in the Wetterau Museum, from left to right: Franz Heinrich von Dalberg, Johann Maria Rudolf Reichsgraf Waldbott von Bassenheim, Clemens August von Westphalen.

== See also ==
- Burgraviate of Friedberg
