= Büdingen =

- Town
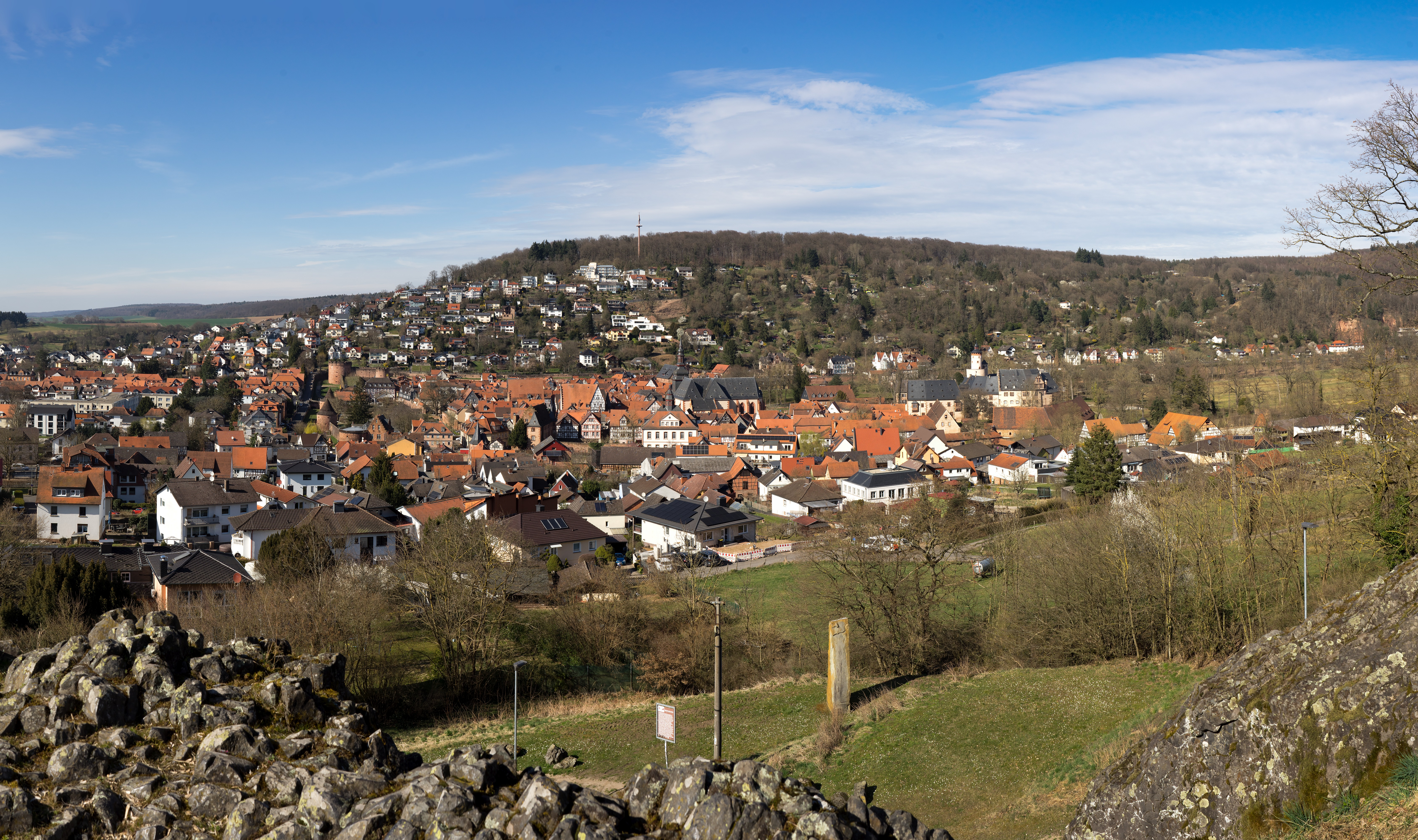
- Historic centre

- Coat of arms

- Location of Büdingen within Wetteraukreis district
- Interactive map of Büdingen
- Location within Germany Location within Hesse
- Coordinates: 50°17′27″N 9°6′45″E
- Country: Germany
- State: Hesse
- Admin. region: Darmstadt
- District: Wetteraukreis
- Subdivisions: 16 districts

Government
  - Mayor (2021–27): Benjamin Harris (CDU)

Area
  - Total: 122.88 km^{2} (47.44 sq mi)
- Elevation: 134 m (440 ft)

Population (2025-12-31)
  - Total: 22,068
  - Density: 179.59/km^{2} (465.14/sq mi)
- Time zone: UTC+01:00 (CET)
  - Summer (DST): UTC+02:00 (CEST)
- Postal codes: 63654
- Dialling codes: 06042
- Vehicle registration: FB, BÜD

Büdingen (German pronunciation: [ˈbyːdɪŋən]) is a town in the Wetteraukreis, in Hesse, Germany. It is mainly known for its well-preserved, heavily fortified medieval town wall and half-timbered houses.

== Geography ==
=== Location ===
Büdingen is in the south of the Wetterau below the Vogelsberg hills at an altitude of approx. 160 meters. The city is situated 15 km northwest of Gelnhausen and about 40 km east from Frankfurt am Main. Historically, the city belongs to Oberhessen.

=== Geology ===
Büdingen is situated in a wet and swampy valley. The castle and the old town therefore rest on centuries-old oak planks, placed horizontally across vertical beech piles (poles). The water level has to be kept high enough so that no air can reach these foundations.

=== Districts ===
Since 1972, the municipality includes the following formerly independent villages: Aulendiebach, Büches, Büdingen (core or centre), Calbach, Diebach am Haag, Düdelsheim (the largest municipality), Dudenrod, Eckartshausen, Lorbach, Michelau, Orleshausen, Rinderbügen, Rohrbach, Vonhausen, Wolf, and Wolferborn.

In the same year, the district (Landkreis) of Büdingen was dissolved, and Büdingen and the district of Friedberg formed the Wetteraukreis, with Friedberg becoming the new district capital.

== History ==
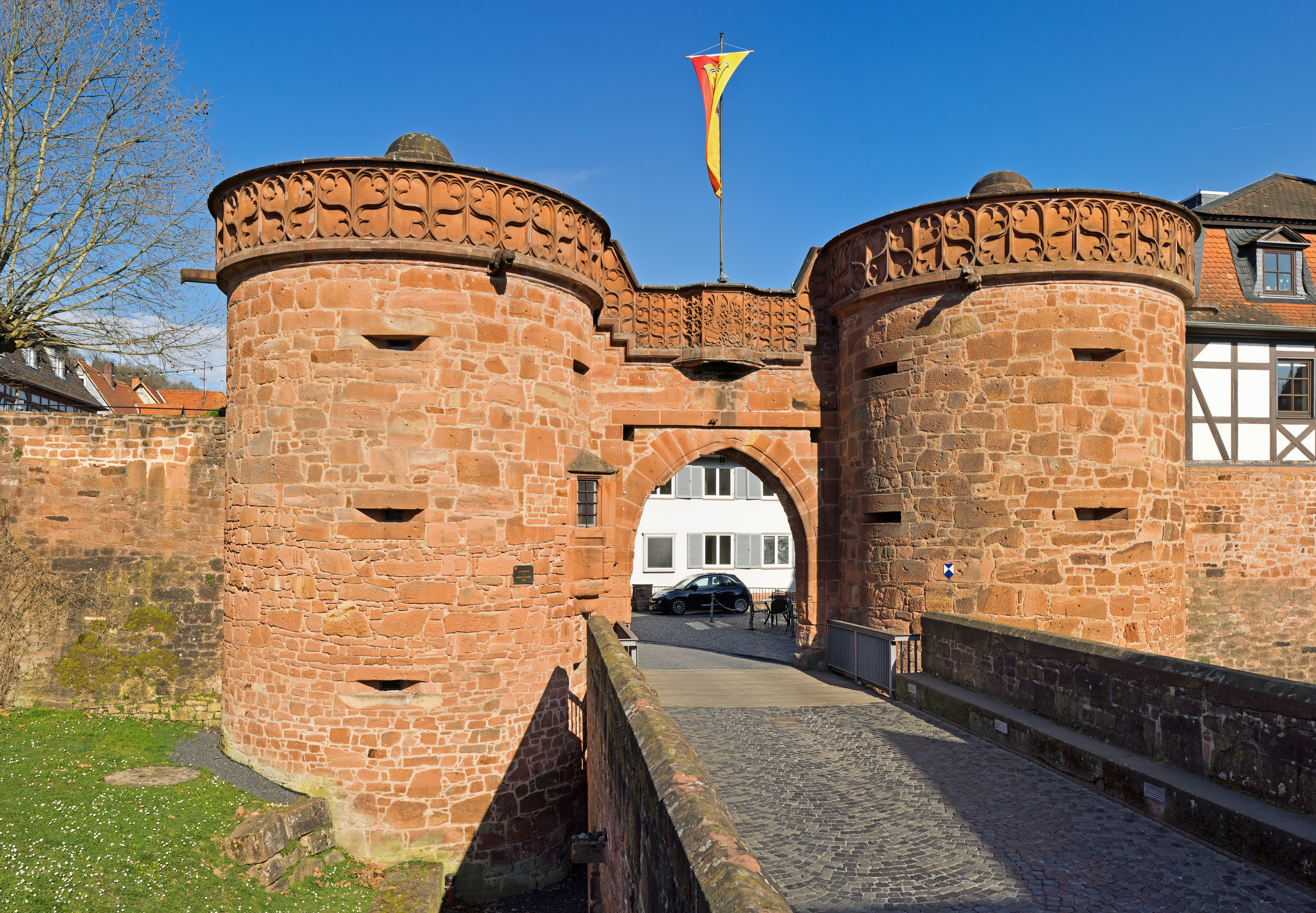
"Jerusalem Gate" (or "lower gate")

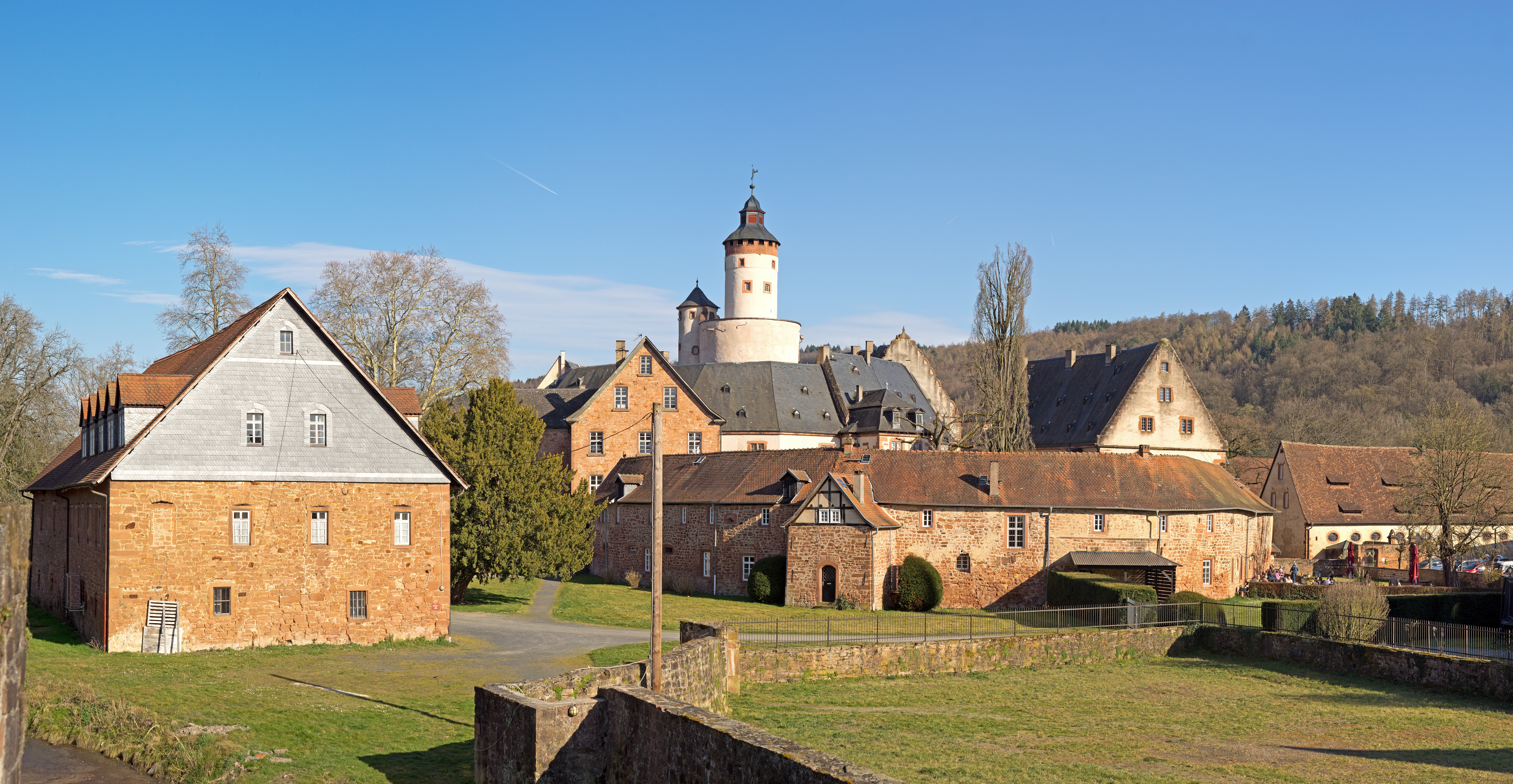
Büdingen Castle

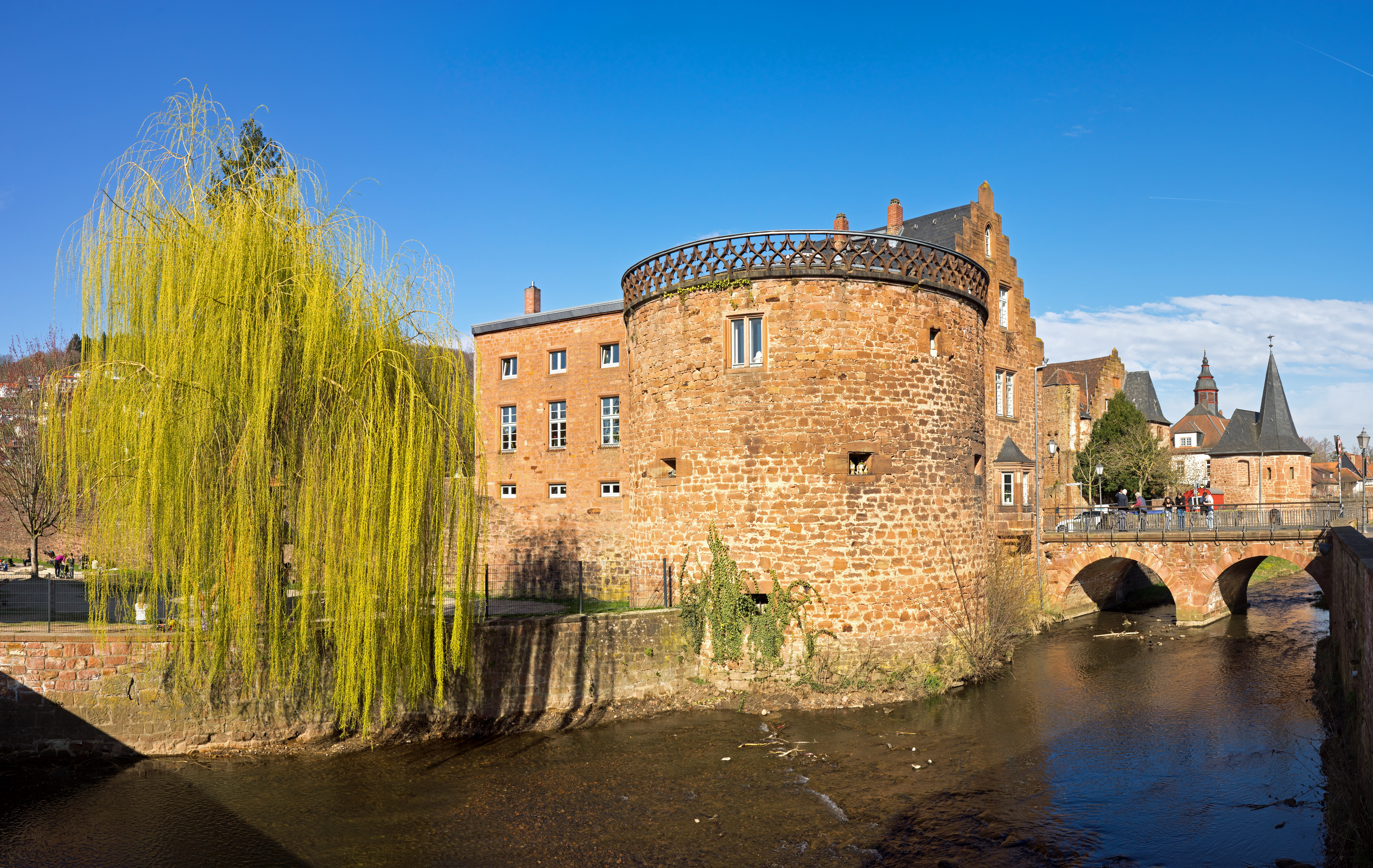
Mühltorbrücke

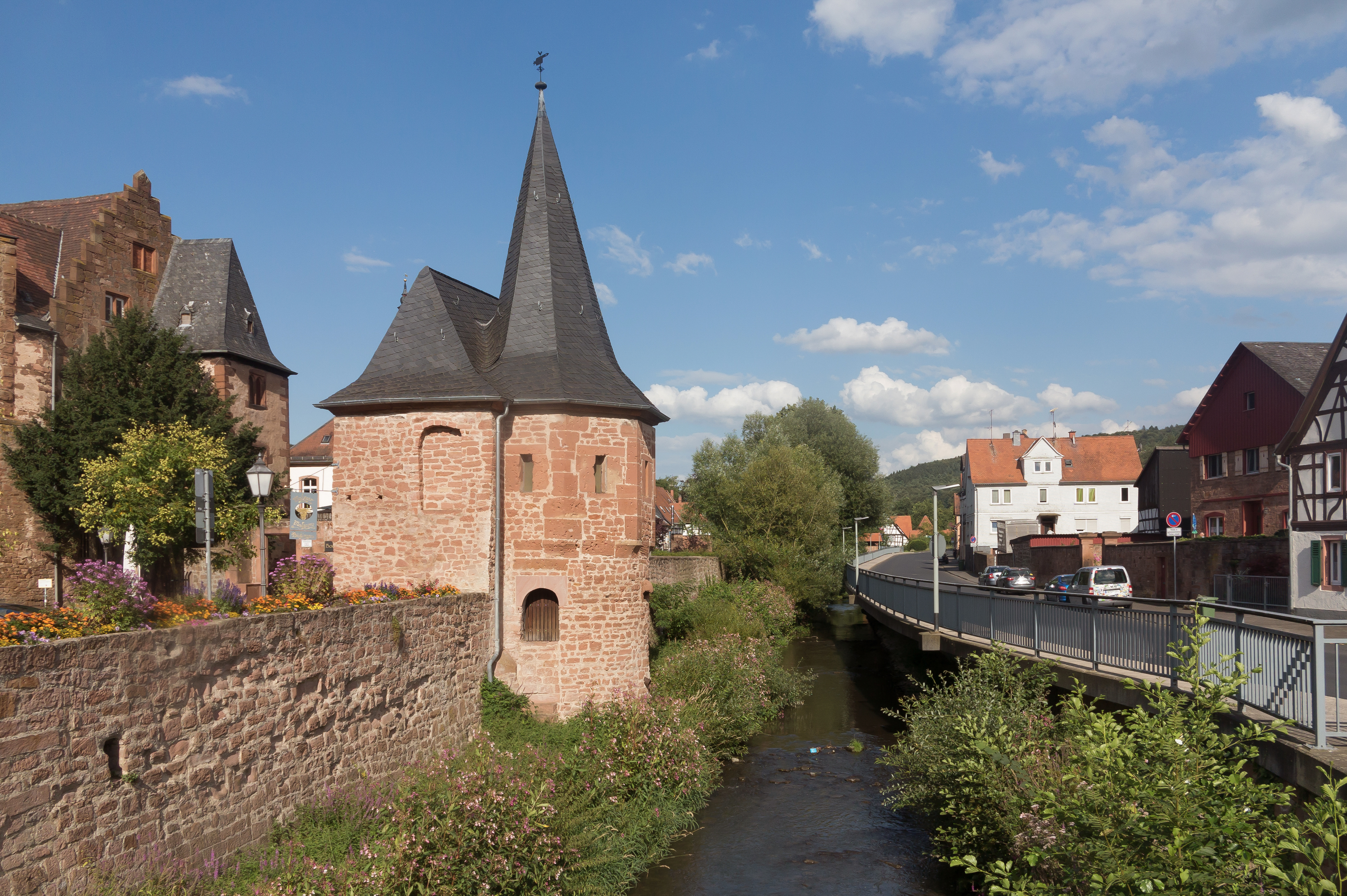
Schlaghaus

Around 700 the wooden church of Saint Remigius was built by an unknown lord. In 847 a "Büdingen" was named in a document for the first time, but it is not clear which Büdingen was meant, because there are some other smaller towns with the same name in Germany and Lorraine. An additional floor was added to St. Remigius's church in about 1050 and the building has basically remained unchanged since then.

In 1131 the House of Büdingen were mentioned for the first time. They became Burggrafen of Gelnhausen in 1155. The villa ("city") of Büdingen was officially mentioned in 1206. The ruling House of Büdingen died out with Gerlach II before 1247.

Their successors were the houses of Hohenlohe-Brauneck, of Isenburg-Kempenich, of Trimberg, of Hohenlohe and of Isenburg. On 26 July 1330, Holy Roman Emperor Louis IV granted the status of a market town to Luther of Büdingen.

With his edict of liberty in 1353, Burggraf Heinrich II granted freedom and some independence to the people of Büdingen. In return the people had to defend the city, so the Marksmen's Society was founded. This society still exists today as one of the oldest rifle associations in Germany.

Since 1442 the masters of Büdingen have been known as Grafen of Isenburg-Büdingen. After a local war, Graf Ludwig II built an enormous new defensive wall with 22 towers around the old stronghold between 1480 and 1510. These walls are still nearly completely extant and are one of the most important medieval fortifications in Germany.

In 1521, Martin Luther allegedly passed through. In the same year, the town became Protestant, later to become Calvinist.

In 1576, and again in 1632, the Black Death killed many inhabitants. In 1590, a great fire destroyed many buildings.

In 1633 and 1634, as many as 114 people were victims of witch hunting, although the first prosecutions took place in 1567. During the Thirty Years' War, in 1634, the town was taken by Imperial troops, who defeated the Swedish occupants.

In 1578 Emperor Rudolf II rewarded the Grafen/Counts of Büdingen with the "Jubilate"-market (from the Latin word jubilate: "to praise"); an occasion for feasting. In 1806 the County of Ysenburg-Büdingen was annexed to the Principality of Isenburg-Birstein. After the Congress of Vienna, the Principality of Isenburg was divided in 1816 between the Grand Duchy of Hessen-Darmstadt and the Electorate of Hessen; Büdingen went to Hesse-Darmstadt. In 1840, Graf Ernst Casimir III was promoted by a decree of the Grand Duke to the status of hereditary prince.

In 1601 Graf Wolfgang Ernst founded the Latin School, known today as the Wolfgang-Ernst-Gymnasium. In 1712 Graf Ernst Casimir I issued an edict of tolerance permitting religious dissenters to settle in Büdingen. As a result, by 1724 there was a suburb at the Lower Gate (Jerusalem Gate) where Huguenots, Waldensians, sectarians, and other separationists lived.

In 1822, administration and justice were split in the Grand-Duchy of Hesse-Darmstadt. Büdingen became seat of the Büdingen counties lawcourt, which was followed in 1852 by the installation of the district of Büdingen. In 1839, the laborers' school (later called the trade school) was founded. The Mathildenhospital was built between 1867 and 1868. In 1879, a credit union (today the Volksbank), was founded. In 1936 Büdingen became a garrison town; U.S. troops were stationed there beginning in 1945. The last American troops (1st Squadron, 1st Cavalry Regiment) departed Büdingen on 15 August 2007, ending 71 years of town history as a military garrison.

Mail service between Büdingen and Frankfurt am Main began in 1739: one mail coach and two mounted messengers a week. The Gießen–Gelnhausen railway, including Büdingen station was opened between Büdingen and Gelnhausen on 30 November 1870. In 1879 the new Gymnasium was built, including a gym and the principal's residence. Between 1888 and 1895 built a water main and began partial installation of a sewage system. The municipal gas works was established in 1910, and Büdingen received electric light in 1913.

== Trivia ==
- Büdingen was the home to the 1st Squadron, 1st Cavalry Regiment (1-1 CAV), the Division Cavalry unit for the United States Army's 1st Armored Division.
- Büdingen was formerly the home to the 3rd Squadron, U.S. 12th Cavalry Regiment (3-12 CAV), the Division Cavalry unit for the United States Army's 3rd Armored Division from 1957 to 1989. In February 1989 it was reflagged as the 4th Squadron, 7th Cavalry. The town was also formerly home to the 3rd Battalion, 61st Air Defense Artillery (later 3/5 ADA), the Division ADA unit for the 3rd Armored Division (the Spearhead division). Including the 2nd Battalion 83rd artillery (disbanded).
- Albert Einstein visited the castle museum incognito in 1952, but confirmed this later in a letter.

== Twin towns – sister cities ==
Büdingen is twinned with:

- Bruntál, Czech Republic
- Gistel, Belgium
- Herzberg, Germany
- Loudéac, France
- Sebeș, Romania
- Tinley Park, United States

== Notable people ==
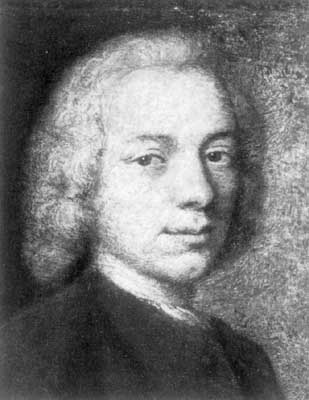
Samuel König

- Diether von Isenburg (1412–1482), Archbishop of Mainz (1459–1463 and 1475–1482)
- Johann Samuel König (1712–1757), mathematician (König's theorem)
- Johannes Jährig (1741–1795), Mongolist and translator of Tibetan and Mongolian texts
- Ernst Casimir II (1808–1861), 2nd Prince of Ysenburg and Büdingen
- Johann Ludwig Wilhelm Thudichum (1829–1901), pioneer of Neurochemistry
- Bruno (1837–1906), 3rd Prince of Ysenburg and Büdingen
- Erich Geißler (1895–1967), Generalmajor, bearer of the Iron Cross
- Ado Kraemer (1898–1972), chess composer
- Gerhard Wies (born 1961), athlete, silver medalist in the 2004 Paralympics

=== Associated with the town ===
- Erasmus Alber (c. 1500–1553), theologian, reformer and poet, about 1520 teacher in Büdingen
- Hermann von Ihering (1850–1930), physician, zoologist and paleontologist, lived here the last nine years of his life and is buried in Büdingen
- Christian Schwarz-Schilling (1930-2026), Austrian-German politician, entrepreneur and philanthropist, managing director of the Accumulatorenfabrik Sonnenschein in Büdingen in 1957–1982
