= Burgraviate of Friedberg =

Territory of the Holy Roman Empire

Burgraviate of Friedberg Burggrafschaft Friedberg
- Middle Ages–1806
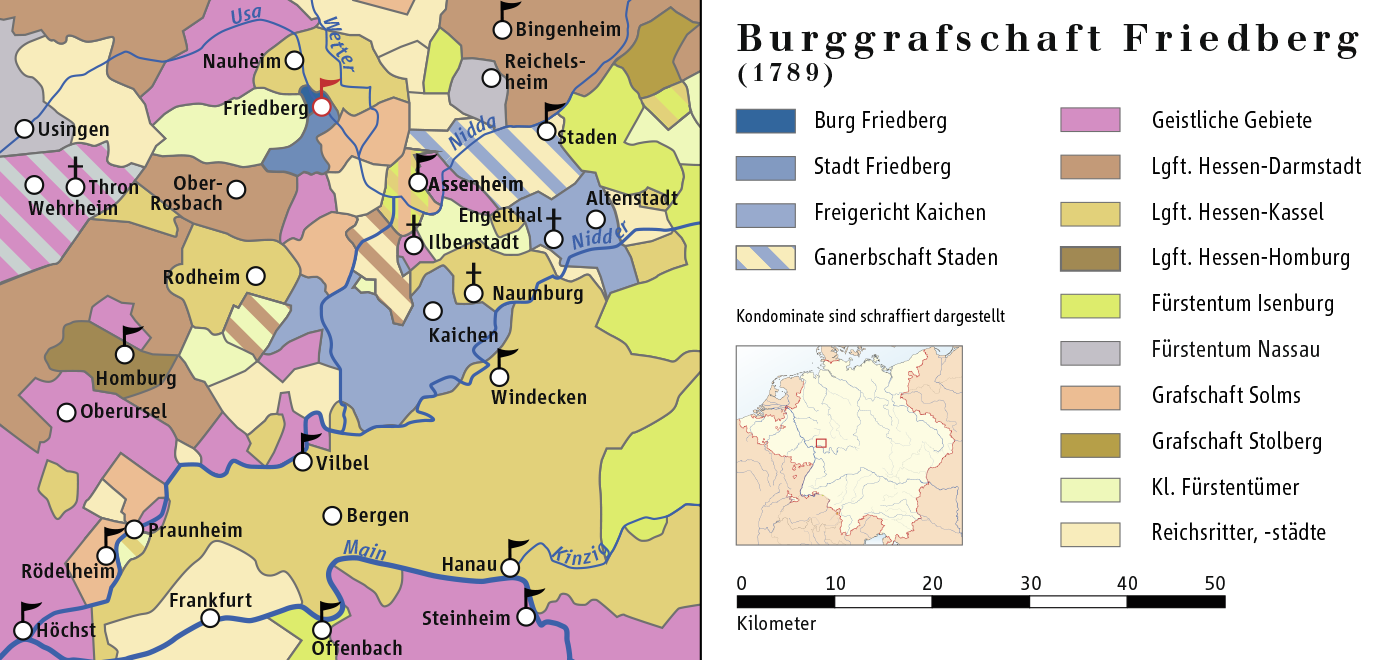
- Status: State of the Holy Roman Empire
- Capital: Friedberg
- Historical era: Middle Ages, Early modern period
  - Established: Middle Ages
  - Disestablished: 1806
Succeeded by
Grand Duchy of Hesse

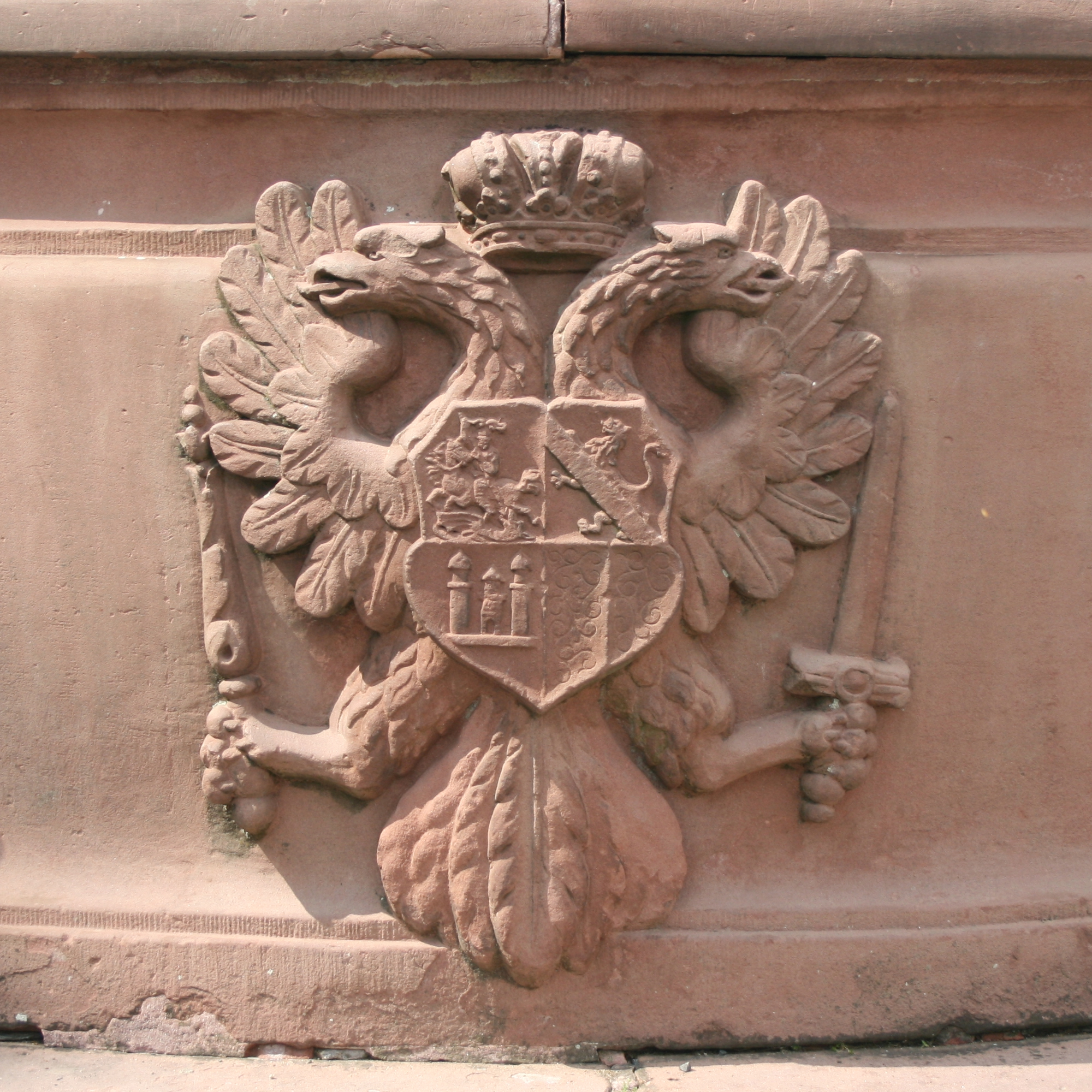
Georgsbrunnen

The Burgraviate of Friedberg was a territory within the Holy Roman Empire. It emerged during the Late Middle Ages from the Burgmannschaft of Reichsburg Friedberg in Hesse. Notably, the Burgraviate featured a cooperative constitutional structure and was endowed with manorial privileges by the Emperor, which were reaffirmed multiple times until its dissolution in 1806. The Burgraviate established its territory, which, in addition to overseeing the neighboring Reichsstadt Friedberg and the Freigericht Kaichen, included a narrow strip of land in the southern Wetterau. Consequently, Friedberg Castle can be regarded as the sole reichsständische castle since its inclusion in the Reichsmatrikel in 1431. According to its self-perception, the Kayserliche und des heiligen Reichs-Burg Friedberg, as it was called, was a prominent institution of the Imperial Knighthood and directly subordinate to the king or emperor.

== History ==
=== Foundation and Hohenstaufen period ===
Friedberg Castle was first documented in 1217 when King Friedrich II addressed the Friedberg burgrave Giselbert, the burgomans, and the Frankfurt Schultheiß, stating that Ulrich von Münzenberg had returned the goods previously owned by his father and brother. It is believed to have been established as a planned foundation by the Staufer dynasty, likely occurring a few years earlier. This assumption is supported by the remains of a Romanesque predecessor church located beneath the Stadtkirche. The construction of the town and castle is understood within the context of Staufer's imperial land policy. Following 1171, when the Grafen von Nürings died out, their fiefs in the Wetterau reverted to the Empire, accelerating its transformation into a Staufer estate. The establishment of Friedberg parallels the founding and expansion of the castles and Imperial Cities Gelnhausen and Wetzlar.

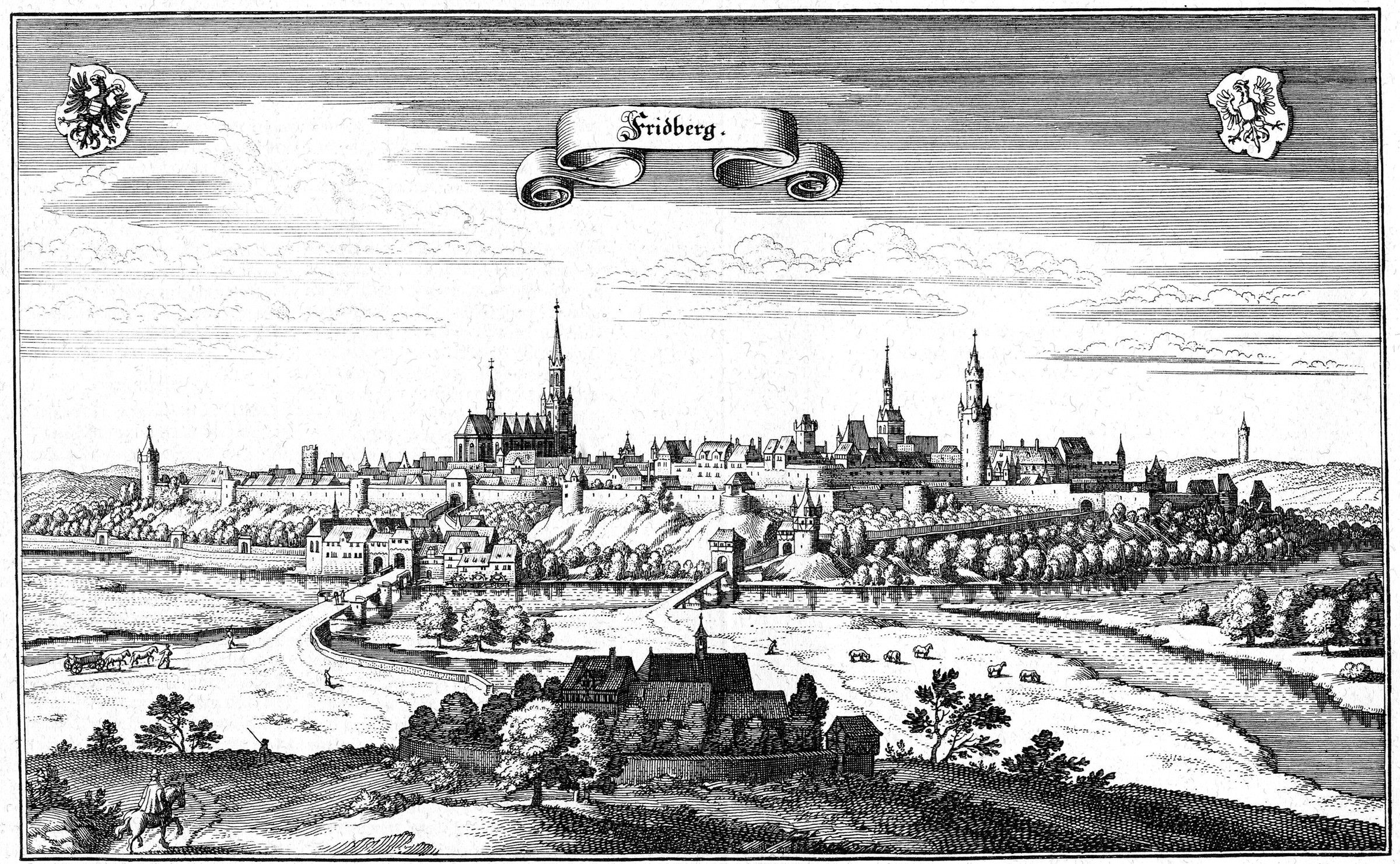
Friedberg town and castle in the 17th century, engraving by Matthäus Merian

=== Interregnum ===
During the Interregnum (1245-1273), both the castle and town of Friedberg, like many imperial towns founded by the Hohenstaufen emperors, initially supported the Hohenstaufen cause. However, with Conrad IV's departure to Italy in 1252, Friedberg shifted its allegiance. This change is first documented with charters issued by the counter-king William of Holland on 17 September 1252. The shift in allegiance and the end of loyalty to the Hohenstaufen proved advantageous when William, just a few days later on 20 September 1252, exempted the Burgmannen from the obligation to participate in imperial military service but offered them a voluntary personal and financial contribution.

During this period, the Burgmannen successfully elevated their status from Reichsministerialen to lower nobility. By the end of the Interregnum, they had full land rights over their castle fiefs and possessed full feudal capacity. Subsequent kings only needed to confirm this status to secure the support of the Burgmannen, as evidenced by a document from Albrecht I. in 1298. This elevation marked their rise to imperial independence within the cooperative association.

King Rudolf I had previously confirmed extensive rights for the castle and its Burgmannen, solidifying their prominent position. This had a significant impact on the constitutional development of the burgraviate:

- In autumn 1275, Rudolf supported the castle materially by allocating the annual tax from the Friedberg Jews, amounting to 130 Marks of Cologne pfennigs, to the castle. This support likely addressed the substantial maintenance costs of the large castle complex. Although it has been suggested that these donations indicate the castle had been previously destroyed by the city, this remains unproven. Additionally, the castle was granted the Ungeld collected in the town in 1285 (in subsidium edificiorum et reparacionis castri nostri).
- The court privilege of 1 May 1287 was granted to the Burgmannen as recognition of their loyal service. This privilege meant they could only be tried or sued before their burgrave, except in cases involving the royal court. This right was repeatedly reaffirmed by subsequent rulers until modern times, often as part of broader confirmations of castle privileges. The existence of a separate castle court is likely as early as the first half of the 13th century.
- In another document from the same period, Rudolf prohibited the construction of new castles, fortifications, or festen Häusern near Friedberg to maintain the imperial castle's spatial dominance.
- In 1285, Rudolf also granted the Burgmannen the privilege of controlling the admission of freemen or lords to the Burgmannschaft, effectively granting them a de facto right to influence membership. By the 14th century, this prerogative had become fully established, with the king no longer influencing the selection of new cooperative members.

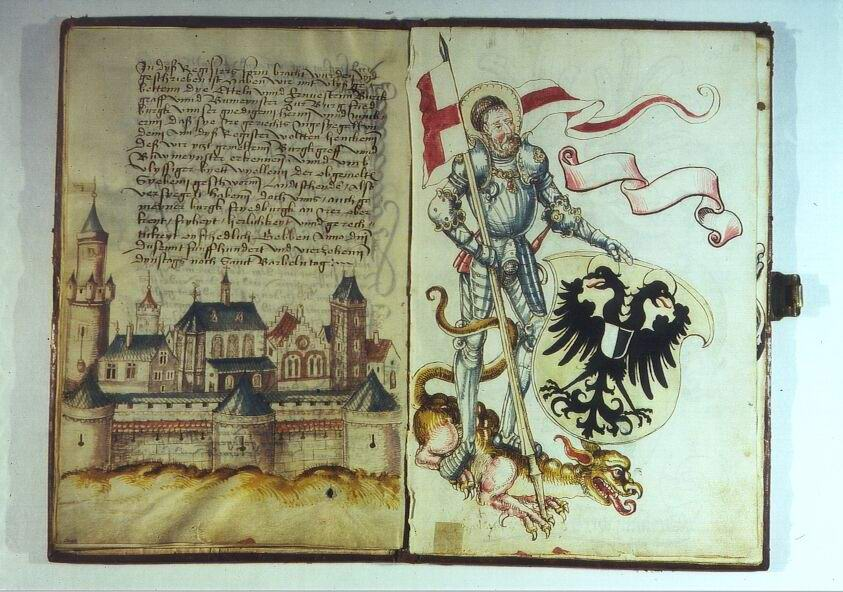
Depiction of Friedberg Castle and St. George as the patron saint of the castle in the Salbuch of Naumburg Abbey

=== Late Middle Ages ===
The rights acquired during the Interregnum, which were already extensive for the organization of imperial castles, were further consolidated in the 14th and 15th centuries. In 1347, Count Adolf I of Nassau-Wiesbaden lost a feud to the lordship of the castle. The ransom paid for this defeat was used to construct the formidable Adolf Tower, serving as a second keep and landmark of the castle. In 1349, under Emperor Charles IV, the Burgfrieden (castle peace treaty) was established, granting the Burgmannschaft the right to appoint the Burgrave, a responsibility previously held by the king.

Despite the burgraviate's peak of power with its inclusion in the imperial register in 1431, the town of Friedberg had been in decline since the 14th century. The Friedberg trade fairs lost prominence due to the nearby Frankfurt Trade Fair and were eventually discontinued. The decline was exacerbated by a reduction in cloth production, two devastating fires in 1383 and 1447, epidemics, and the emigration of citizens. The burgraviate ultimately triumphed in repeated disputes with the imperial city of Friedberg during the 15th century, as the Burgmannen adeptly took advantage of the city's weakened position. By 1454, the city faced insolvency, worsened by the termination of escort services to the Frankfurt trade fair, which significantly impacted its economy and cloth production. In February the following year, the town council was replaced, with the Burgrave and six Burgmannen remaining on the council and assuming a mediating role. Although initially driven by unrest, this transfer of authority was not merely symbolic; it substantially increased the Burgmannschaft's influence over the town.

In 1455, the burgraviate, which had previously maintained a cautious approach, began acquiring portions of the imperial pledge. By 1482, it had compelled the town council to issue the Verherrungsrevers, which prohibited the town from changing lords without permission, effectively subjugating it. In 1483, the burgraviate also secured the signing of a homagesverschreibung, which detailed the relationship between the town and the castle as its lord. Additional shares of the pledge, previously held by various parties, were acquired in subsequent years. By 1376, the burgraviate had gained its first rights in the Freigericht Kaichen, with full sovereignty granted in 1475. The same year, it also secured sovereignty over parts of the Mörler Mark. Additionally, it held a share in the Ganerbschaft Staden around Burg Staden in the Wetterau, which had existed since 1405.

As a result, the sovereignty of the state grew in importance compared to municipal tax and judicial revenues. In 1541, the Münzprivileg (minting privilege) was granted in Friedberg, with coins issued in the name of the respective Burgrave.

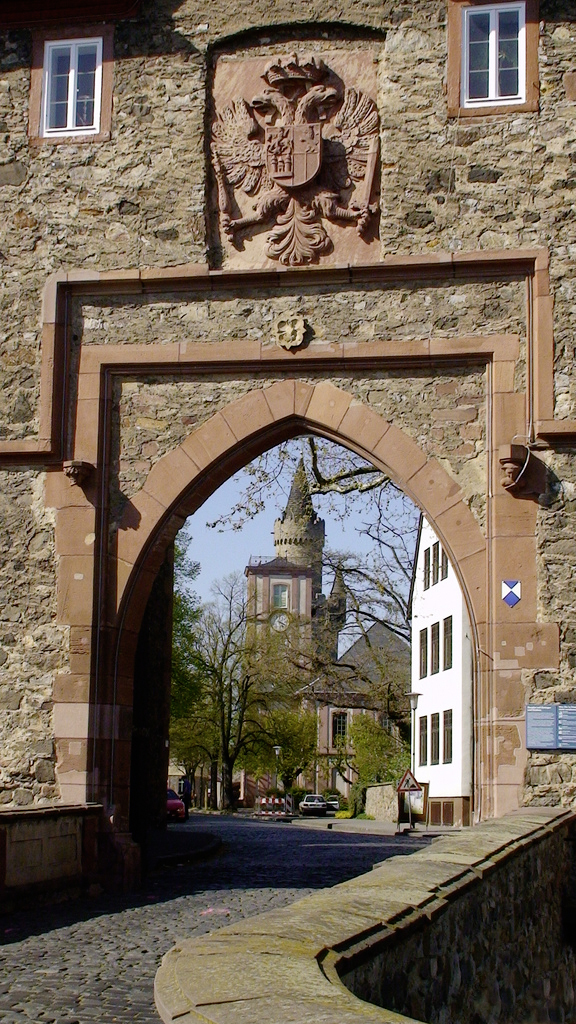
Coat of arms of Friedberg Castle with imperial eagle above the south gate of the castle.

=== Modern times ===
Following the Passau Treaty in 1552, the Reformation in its Lutheran variant was officially introduced in the burgraviate. From 1569, a church order shared with the imperial city of Friedberg was in force. Despite this, the Burgmannschaft continued to include Roman Catholic members, and their numbers even grew over time. After prolonged disputes, Franz Heinrich von Dalberg was elected as the first Roman Catholic Burgrave in 1755.

The decline of the lower nobility in the 17th and 18th centuries had significant consequences for the burgraviate. The extinction and impoverishment of many knightly families in the region led to the deterioration of the essential components of the Burgmannschaft, such as residence obligations, Burghut, Burggericht, and Burglehen. By the 17th century, the castle ceased to actively exercise its imperial status. The number of Burgmannen reached its lowest point at the end of the Thirty Years' War.

The influence of the remaining local lesser nobles diminished further due to conflicts of interest arising from service obligations to larger sovereigns. A significant portion of the castle community was effectively excluded from influencing castle politics. By the 15th century, it became common practice to delegate governance and administrative duties to a smaller body, the Burgregiment, composed of twelve Burgmannen. In burgrave elections, the common burghers had little more than a ceremonial role, with candidates pre-selected by the regiment. Consequently, participation in castle conventions and manorial-administrative events virtually disappeared by the 18th century.

In the modern era, membership in this unique cooperative of the imperial knighthood primarily served to enhance the social prestige of its members within the estate society. However, the influence of the burgraviate was increasingly overshadowed by larger sovereign entities. The archbishops of Mainz ultimately aligned the burgraviate with imperial Catholic policies. By the mid-18th century, most Burgrave families, who had been Protestant since the Reformation, were removed from the office of the Burgrave and from the regiment. The establishment of the Order of St. Joseph in 1768 further solidified this policy and elevated the prestige of the Burgmannschaft, although this prestige no longer reflected its actual importance.

=== Resolution ===
From the 17th century onwards, the castle increasingly transformed into a manor house, evidenced by notable structures such as the castle itself, initially the seat of Johann Eberhard von Cronberg, later the burgraviate, as well as the extensive castle garden and the castle church. During the 18th century, encroachment by the Landgraviate of Hesse-Kassel and the Roman Catholic Electorate of Mainz, coupled with the increased influence of Roman Catholic members, paralyzed the traditional cooperative structure of the burgraviate, leading to its political decline.

After the Landgraviate of Hesse-Darmstadt occupied the imperial city of Friedberg on 2 September 1802, it formally took possession of the burgraviate on 10 December 1803. Military forces entered the castle on 21 January 1804, led by Karl du Thil, who later became Minister President of the Grand Duchy of Hesse. Following these events, Rudolf Waldbott von Bassenheim, who died in 1805, was succeeded by Clemens August von Westphalen. Although the Grand Duke, who had become Landgrave Ludewig I, recognized the sovereignty of the last burgrave de jure, he agreed to respect the burgrave's rights. The last burgrave was permitted to retain his title and collect income from the castle until his death. At the Congress of Vienna, he attempted to revive the burgraviate but was forced to accept a cession agreement in 1817, which limited him to a titular role and the rank of Standesherren. He died in Frankfurt in 1818, and the final Burgmann, Sigmund Löw zu Steinfurth, died in 1846.

Initially, the Grand Duchy incorporated the burgraviate into its administrative structure as the "Amt Burg-Friedberg". In 1821, judicial and administrative reforms led to the separation of jurisdiction from administration at the lower level. The "Amt Burg-Friedberg" was dissolved, with its administrative functions transferred to the newly formed Landratsbezirk Butzbach, and its judicial functions to the Landgericht FriedbScopeerg.

== Scope ==
The Burggrafschaft Friedberg comprised:

- the Burg Friedberg, consisting of:
  - castle;
  - suburb;
  - Jägerhaus;
- the Freigericht Kaichen.

== Constitution ==
=== Inner condition ===
The castle's administration was organized as a cooperative. The group elected a burgrave and master builder as their leaders. Despite various attempts by larger dynasties to assert control, this cooperative structure effectively resisted external influence throughout the Middle Ages and Early Modern Period. For instance, Reinhard I of Hanau was granted a castle fief as Landvogt of Wetterau around 1275, but the Hanau family exited the alliance in 1409. Similar events occurred with the lords von Eppstein in 1292 and Konrad von Trimberg in 1297. Although these fiefs, primarily granted by the king, were notable, they did not significantly alter the constitution of the castle community. The castle rights granted to the German Order Commandery from Sachsenhausen and Marburg, though lasting longer, initially had no substantial impact on the burgraviate's constitution.

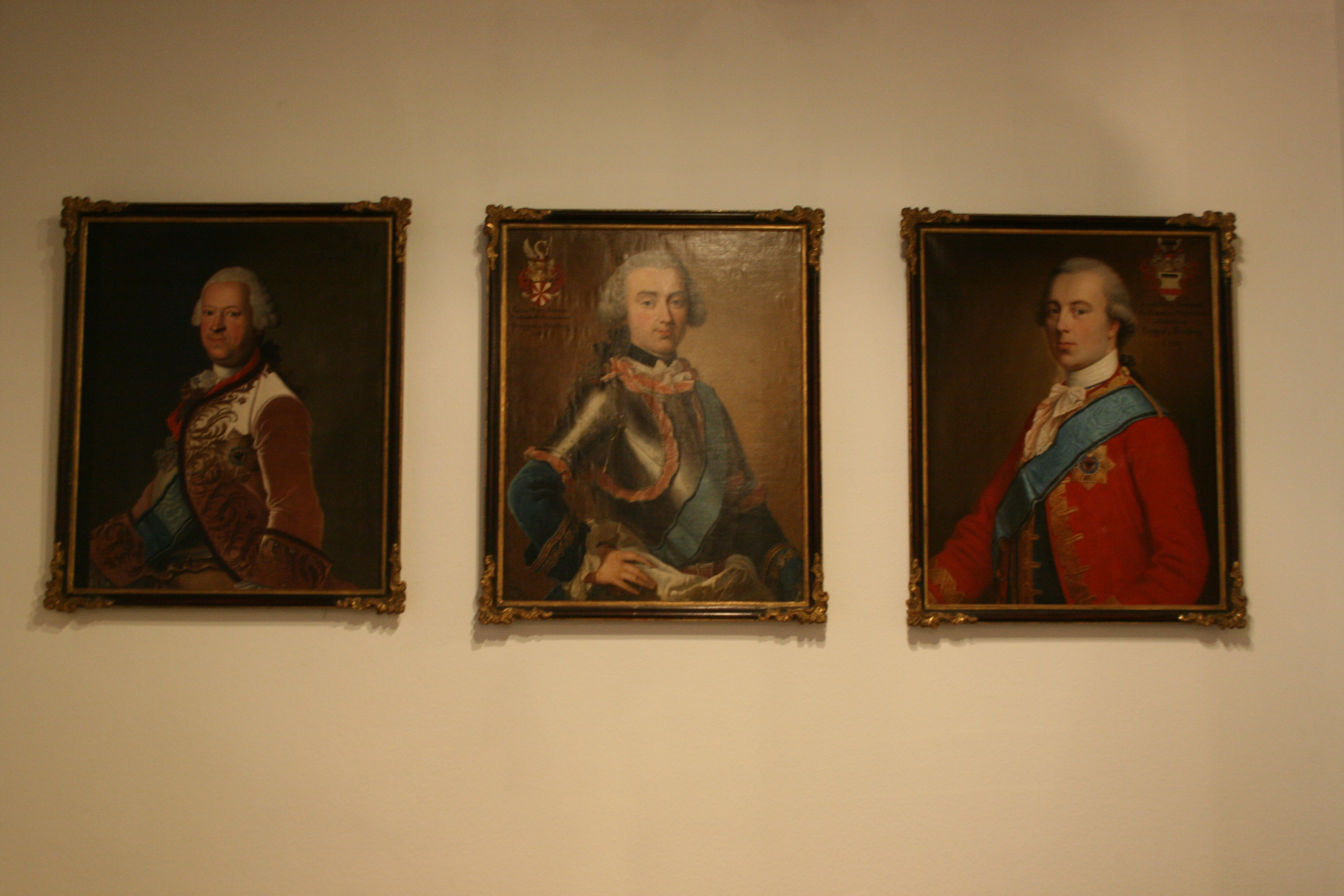
Portraits of the last three Friedberg burgraves in the Wetterau Museum, from left to right: Franz Heinrich von Dalberg, Johann Maria Rudolf Reichsgraf Waldbott von Bassenheim, Clemens August von Westphalen.

==== Viscount ====
The office of the burgrave is first mentioned in a document from 1217, indicating its establishment at that time. Initially appointed by the king, the burgrave was elected for life and required royal confirmation from the mid-14th century onward. Unlike many hereditary burgraveships in the empire, the Friedberg burgraves were drawn from the imperial ministerial family.

The burgrave had comprehensive responsibilities, including military command, representation, and judicial authority over the castle court. His role extended to the imperial city, where he served as the highest representative of the imperial authority (in the 14th century: des Reiches Amtmann), overseeing city officials and acting as the chief judge. The burgrave also executed royal orders outside the castle and town.

==== Master builder ====
The administration of the castle also included two master builders, one older and one younger, as documented in later times. The office was established following the castle's reconstruction after its destruction by the City of Friedberg in 1275. Over time, the master builders' roles expanded to include economic and financial administration. They became prominent members of the castle community, often appearing in documents alongside the burgrave and regimental burgomans. By the 16th century, like the burgrave, the master builders were required to reside permanently within the castle, serving as representatives of the burgrave and administrators of the burgraviate's finances.

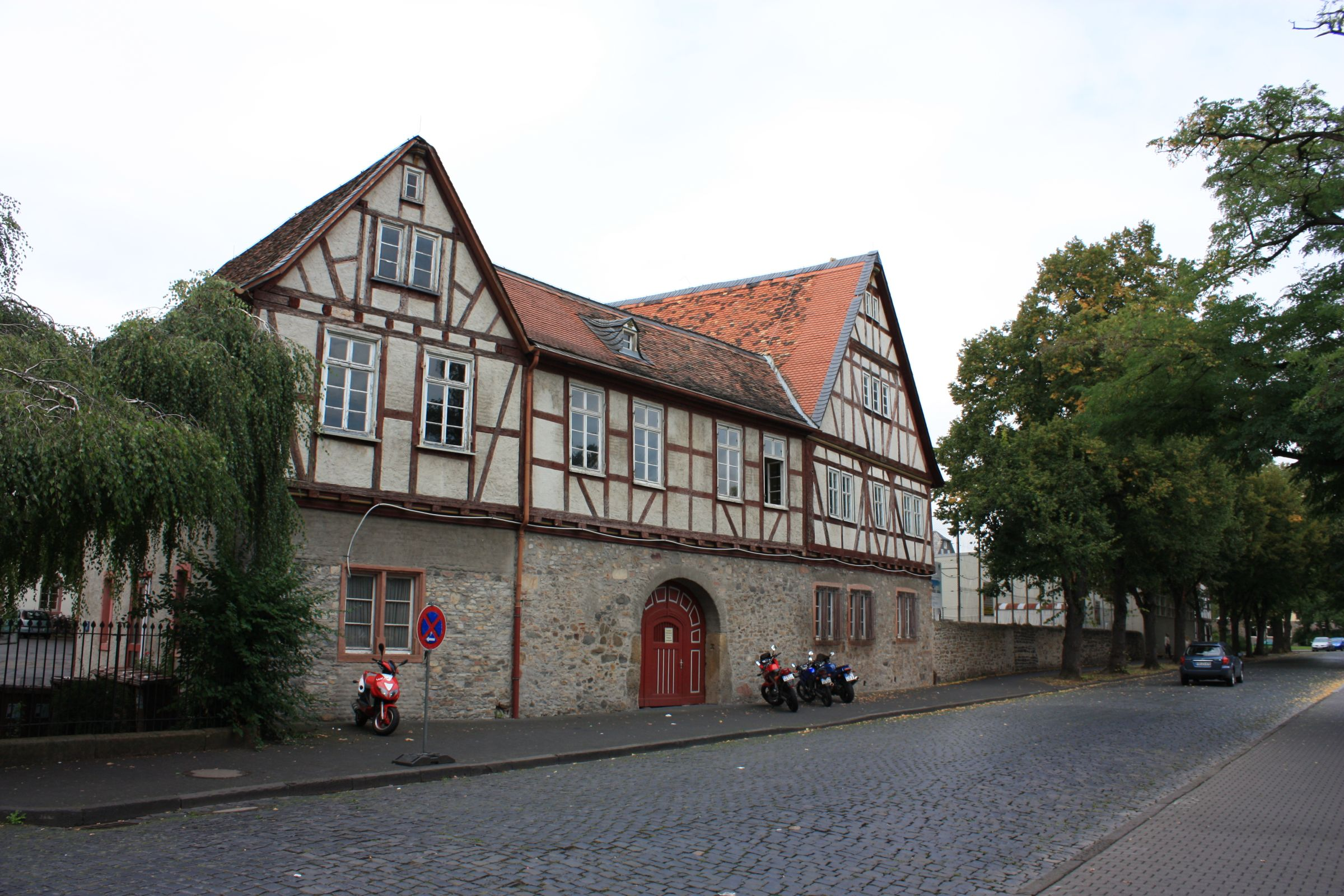
Former Burgmannenhäuser within Friedberg Castle.

==== Burgomasters ====
In the 13th century, approximately 35 noble families with around 100 Burgmannen constituted the Burgmannschaft. The composition of this group fluctuated significantly over the centuries due to genealogical changes and political circumstances. The first known Reception Statute dates back to 1478 and aimed to maintain the homogeneity of knightly status among new members. From this point, proof of entitlement to inherit a castle fief was no longer mandatory; instead, a fee of 100 guilders was required, which was exceptionally high for the time.

The proof of equality through an ancestor test, established by the Reception Statute, became a crucial requirement. This test evolved, becoming increasingly detailed. By 1652, the presentation of family trees in color was mandated, and by 1692, specific size and material requirements were set. From 1712 onwards, certificates from knightly families were required to verify lineage. In some cases, proof of up to 32 knightly ancestors was needed, although, in practice, evidence typically covered four generations, encompassing 16 knightly ancestors.

Initially, Burgmannen were appointed by the king, but by the 14th century, the role included a right of cooptation by existing Burgmannen. Membership could only be revoked for false statements during the Aufschwörung or for violating the Burgfrieden. Expulsions were rare, and those facing expulsion often preempted the action by resigning their membership.

To fulfill their Burghut obligations, ministerials were originally granted estates by the king without legal claims. These estates were later transformed into hereditary castle fiefs, reflecting Rudolf I's imperial land policy. By 1276, it was noted that the king had organized castle fiefs in Reichsburg Rödelheim following the Friedberg model. The extent of these endowments in Friedberg remains unclear, but they included both monetary and goods fiefs, and sometimes fiefs in kind to support the Burgmannen. Higher dynasts and counts typically received better-endowed grants compared to former ministerials. Estates in the Friedberg possessions of Mörler Mark and the Freigericht Kaichen were also granted later.

Originally, the Burgmannen were subject to a residency requirement, leading them to build Burgmannenhäuser within the castle from the 14th century. Over time, personal residency obligations were relaxed, and Burgmannen duties were often fulfilled by appointed officials. By the 16th and 17th centuries, the personal Burghut became obsolete due to the rise of mercenary armies. During the Sickingian Feud in 1523, additional servants were accepted and paid. By 1535, the castle regiment requested additional men from the free court of Kaichen, and by 1546, substitutes such as Reissige or Landsknecht were permitted. By 1657, monetary payments had replaced personal service, with twelve Reichstaler for four months being a common substitute.

The Burgmannschaft, a cooperative entity since the early 13th century, initially comprised wealthy lower nobility from the Wetterau region. The number of Burgmannen varied greatly over time. Initially, the count was around 20 to 30, increasing to 40-50 by the end of the 13th century, and around 100 by the early 14th century. By 1400, there were 99 Burgmannen from 49 different families. In the 16th century, the number stabilized around 50 but dropped to 19 in the mid-17th century. It later rose again, reaching a peak of 113 in 1783. Between 1473 and 1806, 230 families provided Burgmannen.

By the end of the Holy Roman Empire in 1806, only three of the original families remained in the Burgmannschaft: the Löw von Steinfurth, the Dalberg, and the Schenck zu Schweinsberg.

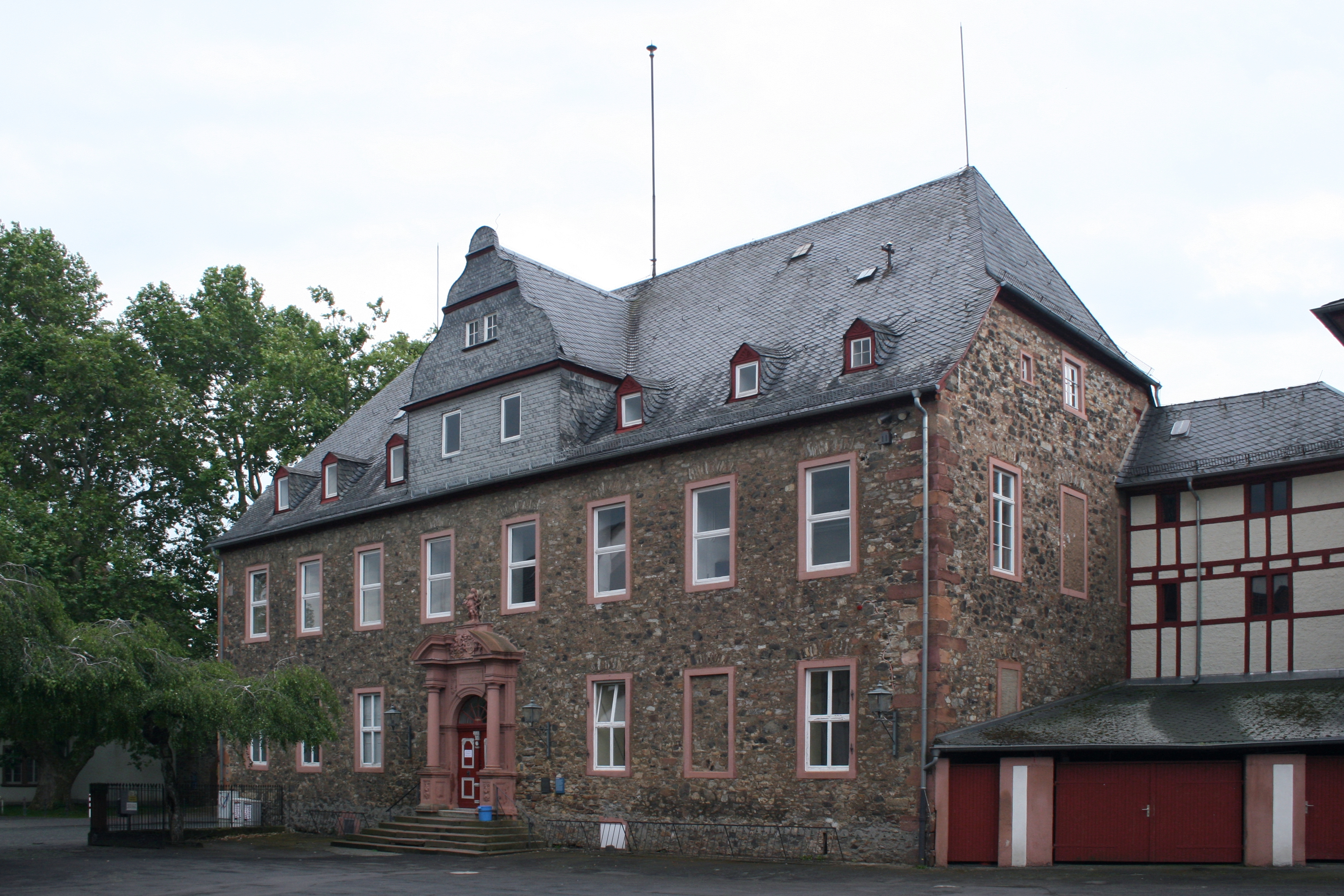
Chancellery building in Friedberg Castle, built in 1512 and rebuilt in 1705. The building was long the seat of the Middle Rhine Imperial Knighthood, today it is part of the castle grammar school.

==== Burgregiment ====
In the 14th century, as the number of Burgmannen increased, it became necessary to streamline administration. By 1401, a committee of twelve Burgmannen was first mentioned, which eventually solidified into the Burgregiment, formally referenced in 1467. Initially, this group included the burgrave, who later assumed a distinct role, along with the master builder and five burgomans delegated to the Rat der Reichsstadt Friedberg.

The Burgregiment was responsible for managing the castle and its surrounding territory. This committee also functioned as the castle court, chaired by the burgrave. From at least 1491, the Burgrave had to be elected from among the Burgmannen, specifically those who had previously served as regimental Burgomaster. This system, along with the election of two master builders from within the regiment, concentrated administrative responsibilities in the hands of this smaller governing body. The regimental burgomans were required to reside near Friedberg to ensure prompt availability for decision-making, making their assembly more practical than the broader Burgkonvent or Burgverbot of all Burgmannen.

==== Law ====
The Friedberg Police Regulations, first recorded in writing in 1679, governed the burgraviate's specific laws. These regulations, which addressed policing, administrative, and order-related matters, were the principal source of law alongside the broader Solmser Landrecht, which covered civil law. The Gemeine Recht was applied in cases where neither the Friedberg Police Regulations nor the Solmser Landrecht provided guidance. This legal framework persisted into the 19th century after the burgraviate's incorporation into the Grand Duchy of Hesse. It was only with the enactment of the Bürgerliches Gesetzbuch on 1 January 1900, establishing uniform law across the German Empire, that these older laws were repealed.

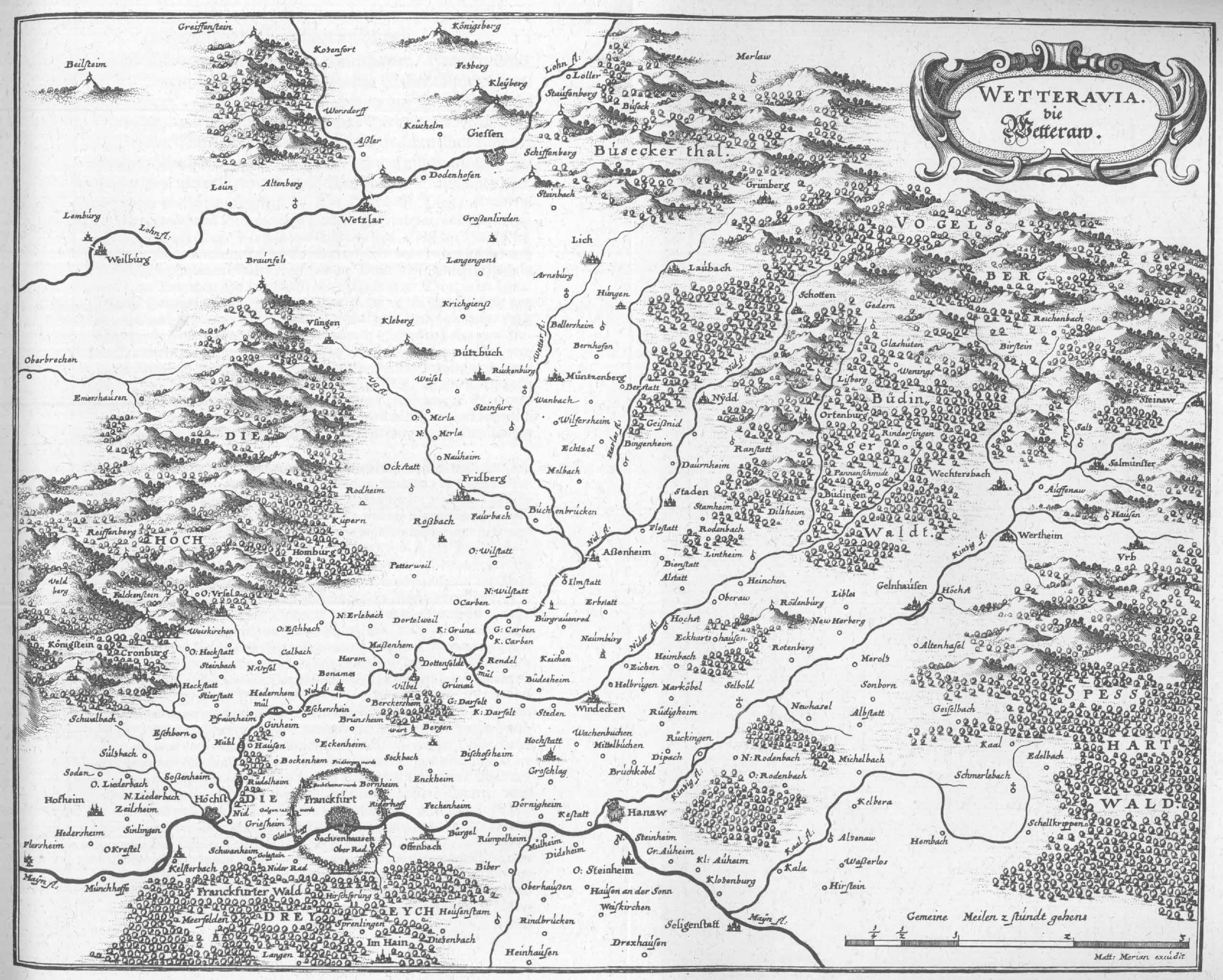
The Wetterau in the Topographia Hassiae et regionum vicinarum.

=== External condition ===
==== Relationship with the empire ====
The constitutional status of the Burgmannschaft in the Holy Roman Empire was indeed an anomaly within the broader imperial structure, primarily due to the special privileges and direct ties they enjoyed with the imperial head. This unique status was formalized at the Imperial Diet of Nuremberg in 1431, with the burgraviate being included in the Imperial Registry, marking its formal recognition of imperial immediacy. The burgraviate was required to provide 30 gleves for the Hussite War, which was comparable to the contingent of significant imperial entities like the Dukes of Mecklenburg or the Bishop of Speyer.

Over time, the Burgmannschaft sought to extricate itself from these obligations. The dual burden of military service and taxation—stemming from their position as both Reichsstand (imperial estates) and members of the Reichsritterschaft (imperial knighthood)—was onerous. Additionally, the division into Reichskreiss (imperial circles) introduced further financial burdens. Citing the imperial military privilege of 1252, the Burgmannschaft sought to renounce their imperial status as early as the 16th century.

The Empire's recognition of this legal position was sluggish. Although some emperors exempted the Burgmannschaft from imperial taxes, these exemptions were not always confirmed by their successors. Consequently, Friedberg Castle continued to receive invitations to imperial diets until 1662. From 1564 onward, Friedberg ceased to accept these invitations, although evidence suggests that envoys continued to travel to the diets. The disputes over their status were eventually resolved in 1577 when Emperor Rudolf II granted an exemption from imperial and county taxes and confirmed Friedberg’s status as part of the imperial knighthood. Despite this resolution, discussions about resuming obligations persisted internally but did not lead to significant action until the dissolution of the Empire.

Friedberg Castle maintained a prominent position within the imperial knighthood as the seat and center of the Ritterkantons Mittelrhein (Knightly Canton of the Middle Rhine). The burgrave of Friedberg led this canton until 1729. The members of the canton were largely drawn from the Burgmannschaft. It wasn’t until 1729, and definitively by 1764, that the two bodies—the castle and the Ritterkanton—were formally separated.

==== Relationship with the imperial city of Friedberg ====
The relationship between the Burggraviate of Friedberg and the imperial city of Friedberg was complex and hierarchical. Initially, the castle and town were separate legal entities, with the castle holding power over the town. From its foundation, Friedberg Castle exerted political precedence over the city. The burgrave acted in place of the imperial Schultheiß (local magistrate) and had authority over municipal courts.

By the late Middle Ages, the castle extended its influence over the city, notably from 1306 when King Albrecht I mandated that six Burgmannen, known as the "Noble Six", be sent to the town council. This arrangement ensured significant castle influence over city politics. Although the "Noble Six" were theoretically required to report on injustices in the city, in practice, the town council’s autonomy diminished, and all municipal decisions occurred under the castle’s oversight. Throughout the 14th and 15th centuries, there were numerous disputes as the city council attempted to reclaim some autonomy. However, the financial and political crises of the 15th century, combined with the acquisition of pledges from various lords, eventually left the city in a dependent state. By the end of the 15th century, citizens were obliged to pay homage to the reigning Burgrave, reflecting the complete dominance of the castle over the city.

==== Rule and rights in the Wetterau ====
The expansion of the Friedberg burgraviate’s rights and estates over the centuries illustrates the gradual transformation of the castle's role from a purely imperial stronghold into a significant territorial power in its right. Initially, the burgraviate’s rights included essential resources necessary for maintaining and supporting the castle. These rights encompassed hunting and forest rights granted by the Staufer emperors, which were crucial for providing game and timber. The burgraviate also had timber and fishing rights important for both construction and sustenance. A roughly 60-hectare meadow area between Dorheim and Ossenheim was used primarily for supplying horses. These early rights were foundational for the operation and self-sufficiency of the castle, but conflicts with neighboring territories, such as those involving the Grafen von Solms, occasionally arose over the usage of these lands.

From the 15th century onwards, the burgraviate began to extend its influence into a broader territorial rule within the Wetterau region. This expansion included the Mörler Mark, an area north-west of Friedberg, which was partly assigned to individual burgomans as service property. Although the entire Mark was never fully possessed by the castle, it was crucial for timber and other resources. The suburb Zum Garten, directly controlled by the castle, contributed labor services for construction and maintenance, though its population dwindled in the 15th century. Additionally, the burgraviate acquired the imperial town of Friedberg in 1455, significantly bolstering its political and economic influence.

In 1405, the burgraviate acquired a share in the Ganerbschaft Staden, a complex communal ownership arrangement involving several parties. Originally consisting of four parts and 19 shareholders, this partnership gradually diminished. By 1806, it included only three partners: Burg Friedberg with 12/57 shares, Grafschaft Isenburg with 13/57 shares, and the barons Löw von Steinfurth with 32/57 shares. The Ganerbschaft covered several villages, including Ober-Florstadt, Nieder-Florstadt, and Stammheim, and extended judicial jurisdiction over additional villages.

The acquisition of the Freigerichts Kaichen in 1475 marked a significant expansion of the burgraviate’s jurisdiction and influence. This free court encompassed 18 villages and four deserted villages, and its jurisdiction included the collection of Gefälle (feudal dues). The burgmannen were the primary feudal lords here, having initially received their estates in the 12th century from imperial possessions of the County of Malstatt.

Efforts by the burgraviate to fully integrate the free court of Kaichen were met with strong resistance from various feudal lords, including those from Frankfurt and the surrounding lords and counts. The disputes centered around taxation and jurisdiction, with the burgraviate seeking to extend its tax authority over the court. Resistance from other feudal entities, invoking their privileges, led to legal challenges. In 1431, King Sigismund intervened to prevent taxation by the castle. It wasn’t until 1467 that Emperor Friedrich III confirmed the burgraviate’s supremacy over the free court. This was followed by further privileges in 1474 and 1475, which reinforced the burgraviate's rights, including tax sovereignty and the ability to influence the court’s administration. These privileges confirmed the burgraviate’s control over the free court, marking a significant consolidation of its power and territorial influence. By the late 15th century, the Friedberg burgraviate had established a significant territorial authority, extending its control over various estates and jurisdictions. Despite ongoing resistance from other feudal lords and occasional conflicts over rights and responsibilities, the burgraviate successfully expanded and solidified its position within the Wetterau region, laying the foundation for its role in the broader imperial structure.

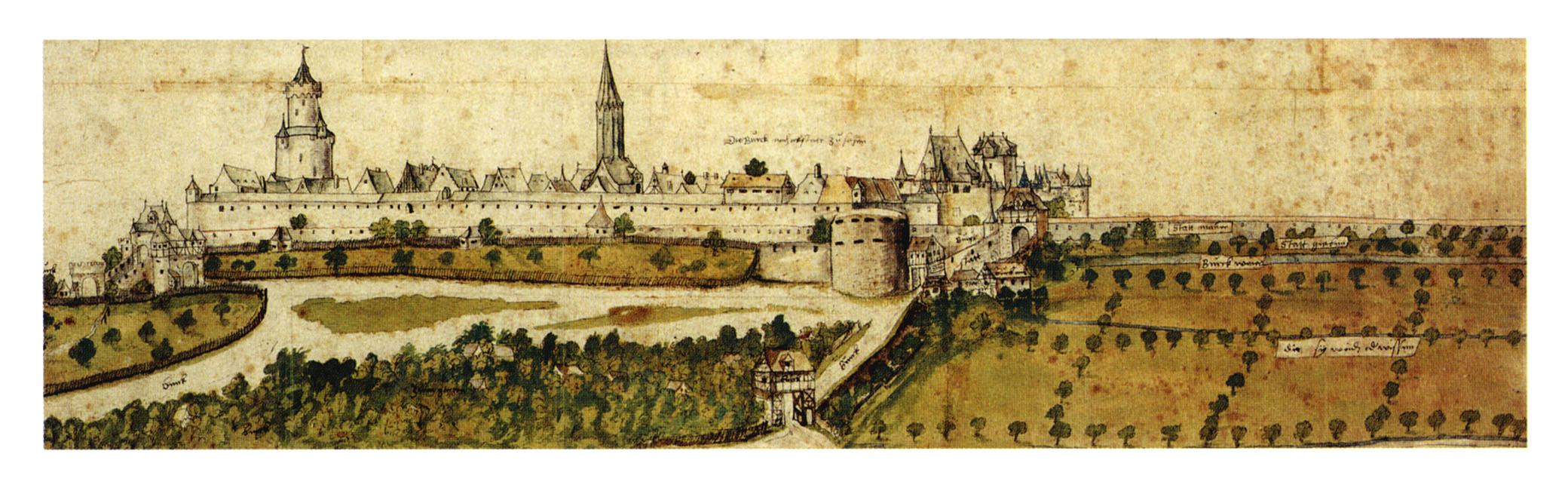
Western view of the densely built-up Friedberg Castle with the suburb Zum Garten in the early modern period (watercolor by Hans Döring, 1553).

=== Noble societies at Friedberg Castle ===
The noble societies associated with Friedberg Castle during the late Middle Ages reflect its vibrant social and religious life. Two notable societies from this period were the Gesellschaft der Grünen Minne (Society of the Green Love) and the Gesellschaft vom Mond (Society of the Moon). The Gesellschaft der Grünen Minne, established in 1365, and the Gesellschaft vom Mond, founded in 1371, both included canons of Friedberg Castle. Despite their concurrent existence, there is limited documentation on these societies. Four documents pertain to the Grüne Minne, while only two mention the Gesellschaft vom Mond, though three additional documents refer to their altar in the castle church. These altars served as the spiritual centers for the societies. The societies themselves ceased to exist by 1387, following a reorganization of church services. Although the altars were retained and continued to be named, the societies were not, and their members were incorporated into a new organization.

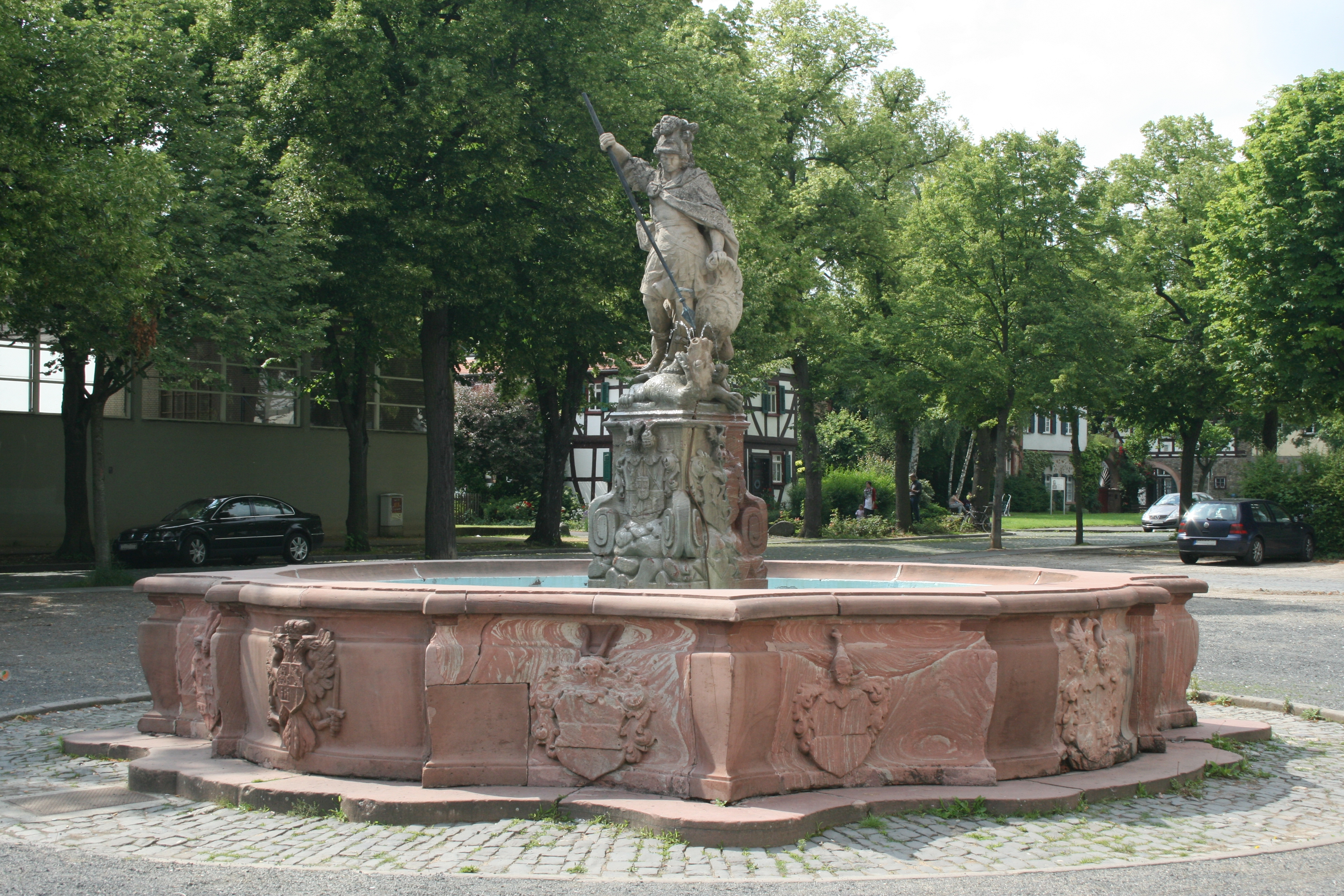
St. George's Fountain in Friedberg Castle (built in 1738, master builder Johann Philipp Wörrishöfer). The coats of arms of Burgrave Herrmann Friedrich Freiherr Riedesel zu Eisenbach (left) and master builder Freiherr von Breidbach-Bürresheim (right) can be seen on the plinth. Not in the picture is the coat of arms of the other castle builder Groschlag von Dieburg, on the fountain bowl the castle coat of arms and the individual fields with the coats of arms of the ten regimental burghers. The sculptor was Burkard Zamels.

==== Brotherhood of St. George ====
In contrast, more detailed information is available about the Fraternitas equestris S. Georgii (Equestrian Brotherhood of St. George), which is documented from 1492. This fraternity, officially recognized by a confirmation letter from Archbishop Berthold von Henneberg, included members such as the canons of the castle, the burgrave, rectores, knights, and individuals of knightly descent. Founded prior to 26 March 1492, the brotherhood was dedicated to the veneration of God, Mary, the saints Antonius and George, and for the salvation of its members. One of its primary activities involved the veneration of a Corpus Christi relic. Annually, on the Monday after Corpus Christi, the members held masses followed by a procession with the relic.

Members of the Fraternitas equestris S. Georgii were required to wear a silver or gold-plated necklace featuring the image of St. George on specific days. St. George was a patron saint of the castle, and the medieval castle church, which was demolished in 1783, was dedicated to him. The St. Georgsbrunnen (St. George's Fountain) in the castle, adorned with coats of arms of the burgrave, the two master builders, the castle, and the ten regimental burgomans, highlighted the castle's governance.

==== Order of St. Joseph ====
In 1768, Emperor Joseph II established an Order of St. Joseph for the Burgmannen of Friedberg. This order's structure included the reigning Roman Emperor as Grand Master, the Burgrave as Grand Prior, with master builders, and regimental Burgmannen serving as commanders. The Burgmannen themselves were knights of the order, reflecting the ongoing significance of the castle and its associated nobility within the broader context of the empire.

== See also ==
- List of the burgraves of Friedberg

== Literature ==
- Karl Ernst Demandt: Geschichte des Landes Hessen. 2. Auflage. Bärenreiter-Verlag, Kassel/Basel 1972, ISBN 3-7618-0404-0, S. 470f.
- Albrecht Eckhardt: Die Burgmannenaufschwörungen und Ahnenproben der Reichsburg Friedberg in der Wetterau 1473–1805. In: Wetterauer Geschichtsblätter. 19, 1970, S. 133–167.
- Albrecht Eckhardt: Burggraf, Gericht und Burgregiment im mittelalterlichen Friedberg (mit einem Urkundenanhang). In: Wetterauer Geschichtsblätter. 20, 1971, S. 17–81.
- Friederun Hardt-Friederichs: Das königliche Freigericht Kaichen in der Wetterau in seiner landes- und rechtshistorischen Bedeutung. (= Wetterauer Geschichtsblätter. 25). Bindernagel, Friedberg 1976, ISBN 3-87076-013-3, bes. S. 25–29 und S. 39–41.
- Friedberg (Burggrafschaft). In: Gerhard Köbler: Historisches Lexikon der deutschen Länder. Die deutschen Territorien vom Mittelalter bis zur Gegenwart. 4., vollständig überarbeitete Auflage. C.H. Beck, München 1992, ISBN 3-406-35865-9, S. 179.
- Friedrich Karl Mader: Sichere Nachrichten von der Kayserlichen und des heiligen Reichs-Burg Friedberg und der darzu gehörigen Grafschaft und freyen Gericht zu Kaichen, aus zuverläßigen Archival-Urkunden und beglaubten Geschicht-Büchern zusammen getragen auch hin und wieder erläutert. 1. Teil Lauterbach 1766 (Digitalisat); 2. Teil Lauterbach 1767 (Digitalisat); 3. Teil Lauterbach 1774 (Digitalisat)
- Volker Press: Friedberg – Reichsburg und Reichsstadt im Spätmittelalter und in der frühen Neuzeit. In: Wetterauer Geschichtsblätter 35. Bindernagel, Friedberg 1986. ISBN 3-87076-050-8, S. 1–29.
- Klaus-Dieter Rack: Die Burg Friedberg im Alten Reich: Studien zu ihrer Verfassungs- und Sozialgeschichte zwischen dem 15. und 19. Jahrhundert. (= Quellen und Forschungen zur hessischen Geschichte. 72). Hessische Historische Kommission, Darmstadt 1988, ISBN 3-88443-161-7.
- Klaus-Dieter Rack: Vom Dreißigjährigen Krieg bis zum Ende des Alten Reiches. In: Michael Keller (Hrsg.): Friedberg in Hessen. Die Geschichte der Stadt. Band II, Bindernagel, Friedberg 1999, ISBN 3-87076-081-8.
- Thomas Schilp: Die Reichsburg Friedberg im Mittelalter. Untersuchungen zu ihrer Verfassung, Verwaltung und Politik. (= Wetterauer Geschichtsblätter. 31). Bindernagel, Friedberg 1982, ISBN 3-87076-035-4. (zugleich Dissertation Uni Marburg).
- Thomas Schilp: Urkundenbuch der Stadt Friedberg, zweiter Band. Die Reichsburg Friedberg im Mittelalter. Regesten der Urkunden 1216–1410. (= Veröffentlichungen der Historischen Kommission für Hessen. 3/2). Elwert, Marburg 1987, ISBN 3-86354-070-0.
- Arthur Benno Schmidt: Die geschichtlichen Grundlagen des bürgerlichen Rechts im Großherzogtum Hessen. Curt von Münchow, Giessen 1893.
- Georg Schmidt: Reichsritterschaften. In: Winfried Speitkamp (Hrsg.): Ritter, Grafen und Fürsten – weltliche Herrschaften im hessischen Raum ca. 900-1806. (= Handbuch der hessischen Geschichte. 3; = Veröffentlichungen der Historischen Kommission für Hessen. 63). Marburg 2014, ISBN 978-3-942225-17-5, S. 348–375.
- Joachim Schneider: Ganerbschaften und Burgfrieden in der frühen Neuzeit – Relikte oder funktionale Adaptionen? In: Eckart Conze, Alexander Jendorff, Heide Wunder: Adel in Hessen. Herrschaft, Selbstverständnis und Lebensführung vom 15. bis ins 20. Jahrhundert. (= Veröffentlichungen der Historischen Kommission für Hessen. 70). Historische Kommission für Hessen, Marburg 2010, ISBN 978-3-942225-00-7, S. 129–148, bes. S. 136–141.
- Reimer Stobbe: Die Stadt Friedberg im Spätmittelalter. Sozialstruktur, Wirtschaftsleben und politisches Umfeld einer kleinen Reichsstadt. (= Quellen und Forschungen zur hessischen Geschichte. 92). Hessische Historische Kommission Darmstadt und Historische Kommission für Hessen, Darmstadt/Marburg 1992, ISBN 3-88443-181-1, bes. S. 162–209.
- Reimer Stobbe: Die Geschichte Friedbergs: Von der Gründung bis zur Reformationszeit. In: Michael Keller (Hrsg.): Friedberg in Hessen. Die Geschichte der Stadt. Band I: Von den Anfängen bis zur Reformation. Bindernagel, Friedberg 1997, ISBN 3-87076-080-X, S. 129–246.
