= Ado Kraemer =

German chess player

Adolf (Ado) Kraemer (Krämer) (23 March 1898, in Büdingen – 25 June 1972, in Berlin) was a German chess master and problemist.

He tied for 2nd-3rd, behind Paul Krüger, at Bad Salzuflen 1925, took 6th at Giessen 1928 (Richard Réti won), and took 9th at Dortmund 1928 (Fritz Sämisch won). and tied for 2nd-3rd, behind Krüger, at Bad Salzuflen 1930.
