= Johann Samuel König =

German mathematician (1712-1757)

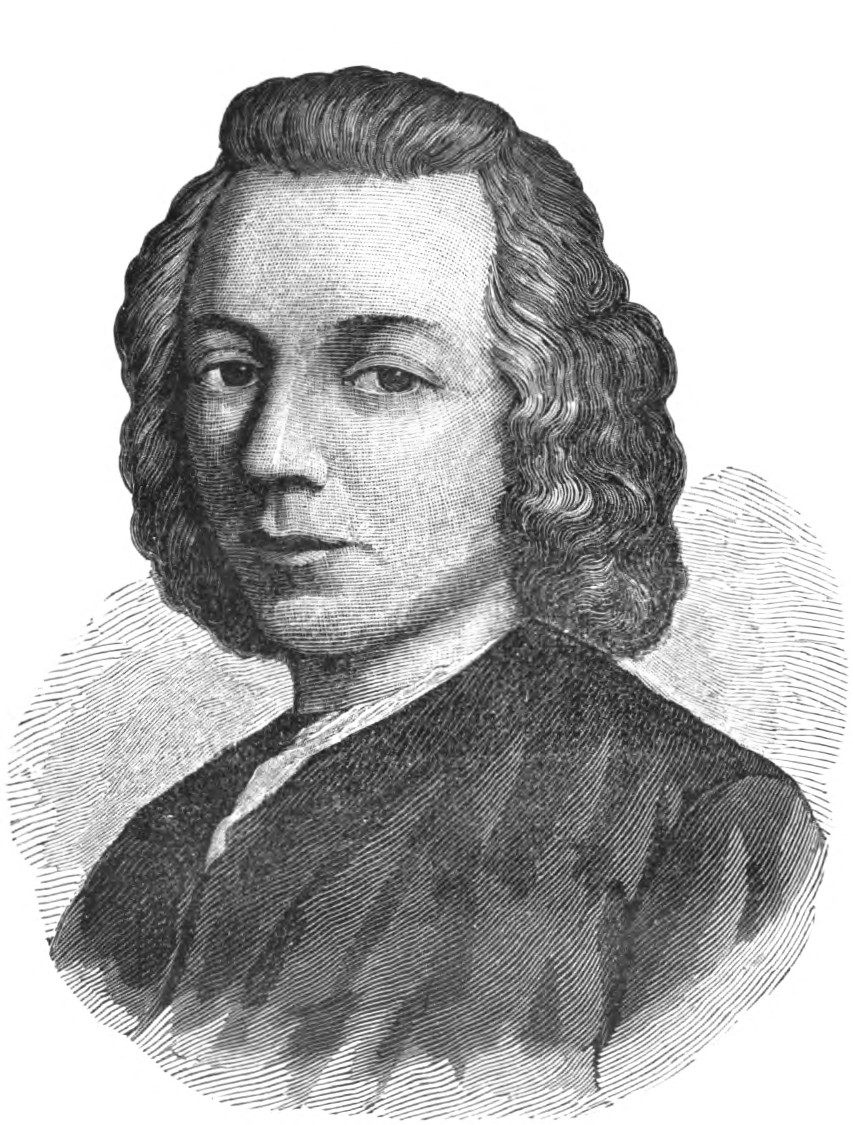
- Born: 31 July 1712; Büdingen
- Died: 21 August 1757 (aged 45); Zuilenstein near Amerongen
- Known for: König's theorem
- Scientific career
- Fields: Mathematics

Johann Samuel König (31 July 1712 – 21 August 1757) was a German mathematician.

== Biography ==
Johann Bernoulli instructed both König and Pierre Louis Maupertuis as pupils during the same period. König is remembered largely for his disagreements with Leonhard Euler, concerning the principle of least action. He is also remembered as a tutor to Émilie du Châtelet, one of the few female physicists of the 18th century.

== Gallery ==
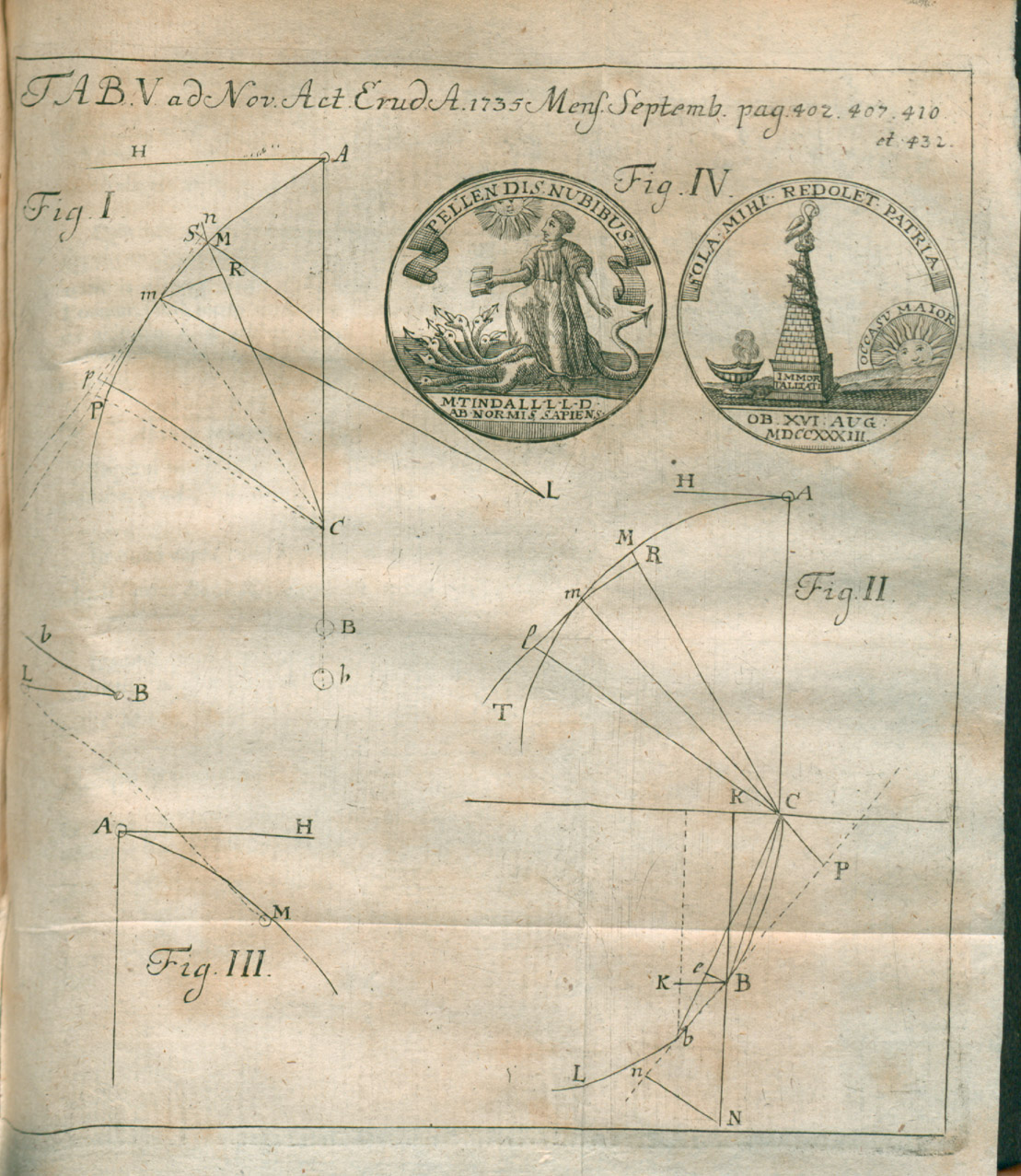
Illustration about the article De nova quadam facili delineatu trajectoria... from Acta Eruditorum, 1735

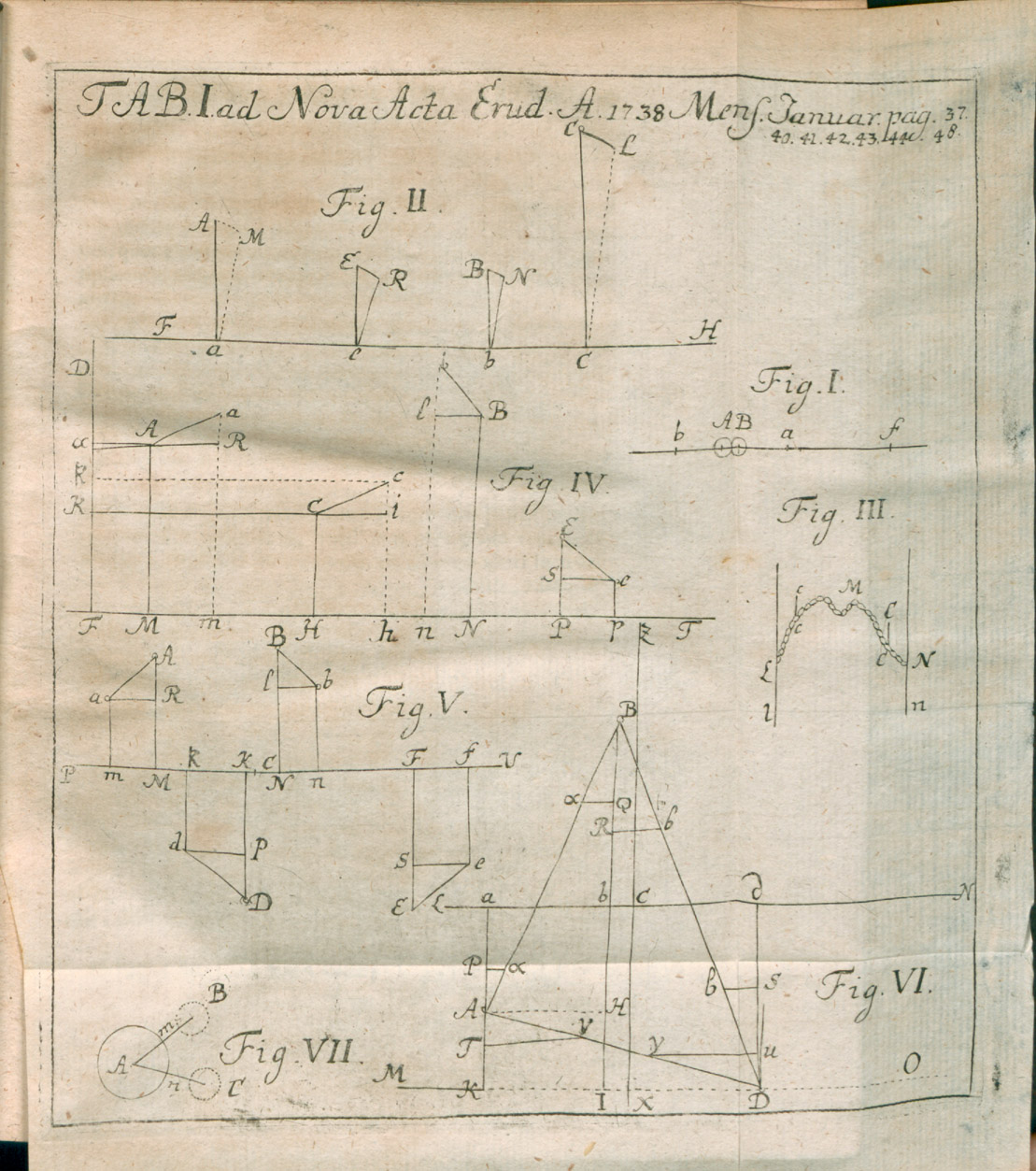
Illustration about the article De centro inertiae... from Acta Eruditorum, 1738
