= Victor von Carben =

Renaissance-era rabbi, later a Catholic priest

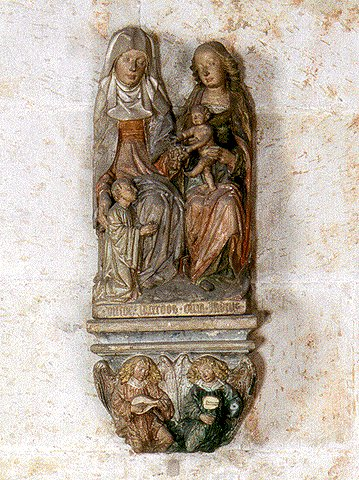
A stone relief memorial, commemorating the converted rabbi Victor von Carben, showing Saint Anne and Saint Mary with Carben kneeling at Anne's feet, looking up at the Christ child, who holds a bunch of grapes out towards him. In Cologne Cathedral, carved ca. 1470.

Victor von Carben, or Victor of Carben (1422–1515) was a German rabbi of Cologne who converted to Catholicism and later became a priest. He endeavored to show his zeal for his new religion by writing against his former coreligionists.

Carben was involved in the Pfefferkorn controversy and was one of the four imperial commissioners appointed to examine Jewish books for blasphemy against Christianity, the others being Johannes Pfefferkorn, Johann Reuchlin, and Jacob van Hochstraten. His work, Judenbüchlein, published in Cologne in 1508 or 1509 described the conditions and customs of Jews with a view to aiding in their conversion to Christianity. He disputed with learned Jews before the Archbishop of Cologne at Bonn, and secured the expulsion of Jews from Brühl, Deutz, and other towns in the Diocese of Cologne. He wrote to the archbishop, congratulating him on having "plucked away the weeds from his bishopric and ridden it of Jews," though like Pfefferkorn, he tried to persuade Christians that mistreating Jews would not aid in their conversion.

In his writings Carben repeatedly asserts that it is not wise for Christians to enter into religious controversy with Jews, the latter being taught from childhood how to uphold their faith. He was chiefly concerned in exonerating himself from the accusation of having apostatized for the sake of worldly advantages; and in view of this, he paid the Jews a gratuitous compliment when he asserted that they, of all the people of the earth, are the most difficult to convert, their attachment to their Law being so strong that neither riches nor fear of persecution can cause them to abandon their faith.

In his old age Carben became a priest; and after his death the following epitaph was engraved on the door of the church of Sainte-Ursule at Cologne: "Victor, formerly a Jew, wrote in the year 1509 four works against the errors of the Jews."

The Judenbüchlein was reprinted at Cologne in 1550.

== Bibliography ==
Victor von Carben was the author of Opus Aureum ac Novum in quo Omnes Judæorum Errores Manifestantur, divided into four parts, the first of which treats of the life and customs of the Jews (Cologne, 1509). Raimann holds that the real author of the latter work was Ortuinus Gratius. It was translated into German. (2) Propugnaculum Fidei Christianæ, Instar Dialogi inter Christianum et Judæum, in quo quod Jesus Verus Messias, Verus Deus et Homo, Totiusque Humani Generis Salvator Sit Demonstratur (Cologne, 1504–08).
