= König's theorem (kinetics) =

Mathematical relation in mechanics

In kinematics, König's theorem or König's decomposition is a mathematical relation derived by Johann Samuel König that assists with the calculations of angular momentum and kinetic energy of bodies and systems of particles.

== For a system of particles ==
The theorem is divided in two parts.

=== First part of König's theorem ===
The first part expresses the angular momentum of a system as the sum of the angular momentum of the centre of mass and the angular momentum applied to the particles relative to the center of mass.

$\displaystyle \vec{L} = \vec{r}_{CoM} \times \sum\limits_{i} m_{i} \vec{v}_{CoM} + \vec{L}'= \vec{L}_{CoM} + \vec{L}'$

==== Proof ====
Considering an inertial reference frame with origin O, the angular momentum of the system can be defined as:

$\vec{L} = \sum\limits_{i} (\vec{r}_{i} \times m_{i} \vec{v}_{i} )$

The position of a single particle can be expressed as:

$\vec{r}_{i} = \vec{r}_{CoM} + \vec{r}'_{i}$

And so we can define the velocity of a single particle:

$\vec{v}_{i} = \vec{v}_{CoM} + \vec{v}'_{i}$

The first equation becomes:

$$\vec{L} = \sum\limits_{i} (\vec{r}_{CoM} + \vec{r}'_{i}) \times m_{i} (\vec{v}_{CoM} + \vec{v}'_{i})$$

$$\vec{L} = \sum\limits_{i} \vec{r}'_{i} \times m_{i} \vec{v}'_{i} + \left( \sum\limits_{i} m_{i}\vec{r}'_{i}\right) \times  \vec{v}_{CoM} + \vec{r}_{CoM} \times \sum\limits_{i} m_{i} \vec{v}'_{i} + \sum\limits_{i} \vec{r}_{CoM} \times m_{i} \vec{v}_{CoM}$$

But the following terms are equal to zero:

$\sum\limits_{i} m_{i} \vec{r}'_{i} = 0$

$\sum\limits_{i} m_{i} \vec{v}'_{i} = 0$

So we prove that:

$\vec{L} = \sum\limits_{i} \vec{r}'_{i} \times m_{i} \vec{v}'_{i}+M \vec{r}_{CoM} \times \vec{v}_{CoM}$

where M is the total mass of the system.

=== Second part of König's theorem ===
The second part expresses the kinetic energy of a system of particles in terms of the velocities of the individual particles and the centre of mass.

Specifically, it states that the kinetic energy of a system of particles is the sum of the kinetic energy associated to the movement of the center of mass and the kinetic energy associated to the movement of the particles relative to the center of mass.

$K = K' + K_{\text{CoM}}$

==== Proof ====
The total kinetic energy of the system is:

$K = \sum_i \frac{1}{2} m_i v_i^2$

Like we did in the first part, we substitute the velocity:

$$K = \sum_i \frac{1}{2} m_i |\bar v'_i + \bar v_\text{CoM}|^2$$

$$K = \sum_i \frac{1}{2} m_i (\bar v'_i + \bar v_\text{CoM})\cdot(\bar v'_i + \bar v_\text{CoM}) = \sum_i \frac{1}{2} m_i {v'_i}^2 + \bar v_\text{CoM} \cdot \sum_i m_i \bar v'_i + \sum_i \frac{1}{2} m_i v_\text{CoM}^2$$

We know that $\bar v_{CoM}\cdot\sum_im_i \bar v'_i = 0,$ so if we define:

$K' = \sum_i \frac{1}{2} m_i {v'_i}^2$

$K_\text{CoM} = \sum_i \frac{1}{2} m_i v_\text{CoM}^2 = \frac 12 M v_\text{CoM}^2$

we're left with:

$K = K' + K_\text{CoM}$

== For a rigid body ==
The theorem can also be applied to rigid bodies, stating that the kinetic energy K of a rigid body, as viewed by an observer fixed in some inertial reference frame N, can be written as:

$^{N}K = \frac{1}{2} m \cdot {^N\mathbf{\bar{v}}} \cdot {^N\mathbf{\bar{v}}} + \frac{1}{2} {^N\!\mathbf{\bar{H}}} \cdot ^{N}{\!\!\mathbf{\omega}}^R$

where ${m}$ is the mass of the rigid body; ${^N\mathbf{\bar{v}}}$ is the velocity of the center of mass of the rigid body, as viewed by an observer fixed in an inertial frame N; ${^N\!\mathbf{\bar{H}}}$ is the angular momentum of the rigid body about the center of mass, also taken in the inertial frame N; and $^{N}{\!\!\mathbf{\omega}}^R$ is the angular velocity of the rigid body R relative to the inertial frame N.
