= Clemens August von Westphalen =

German aristocrat

- Imperial Count of Westphalen
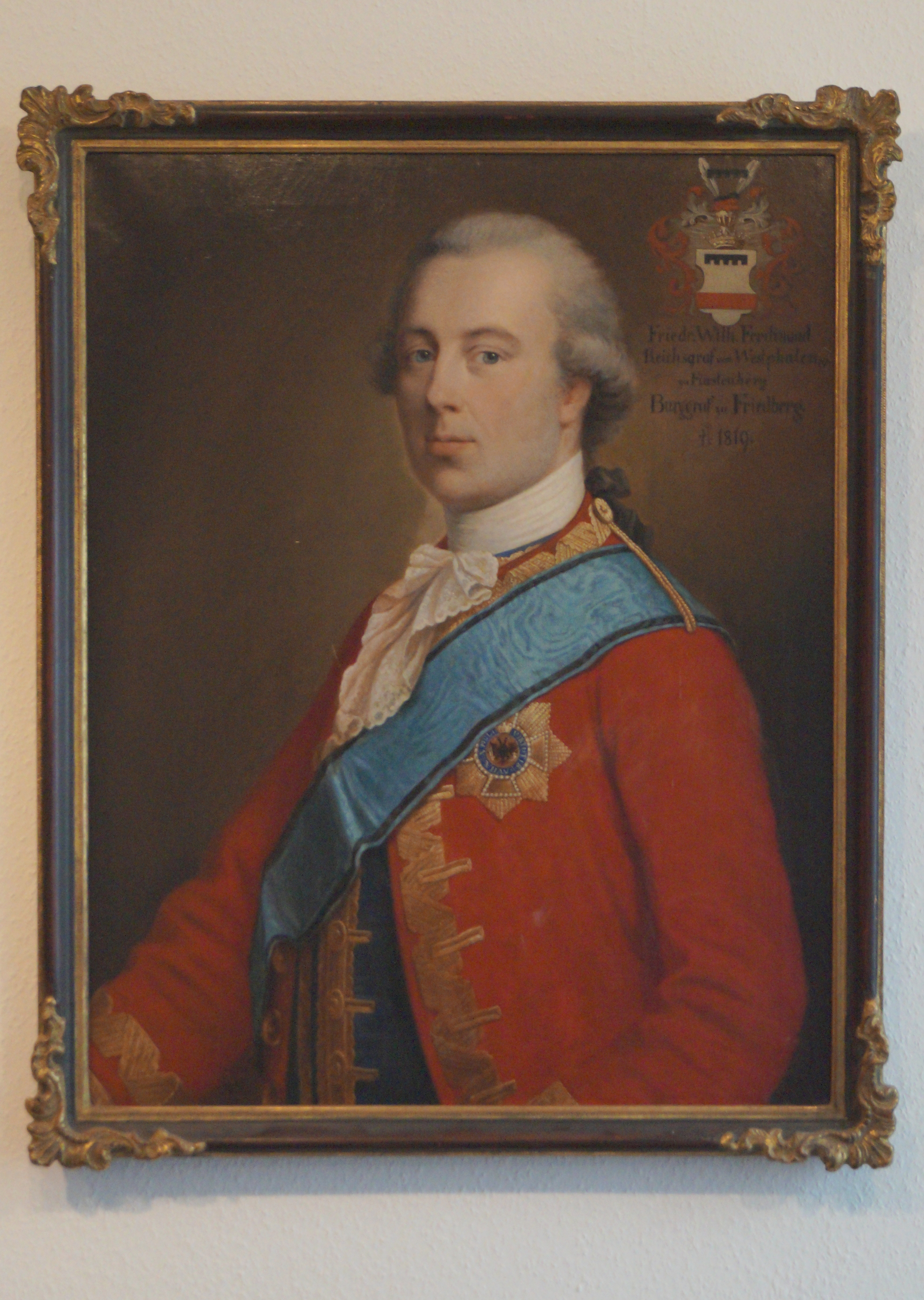
- Portrait of Westphalen in the Wetterau-Museum
- Born: Clemens August, Freiherr von Westphalen; 12 January 1753; Paderborn
- Died: 26 December 1818 (aged 65); Frankfurt am Main
- Spouse: Maria Antonia Waldbott von Bassenheim (m. 1778; died 1786) Maria Theresia von Bocholtz (m. 1788; died 1818)
- Issue: Friedrich Wilhelm von Westphalen; Fernandine von Westphalen; Marie Antoinette Franziska von Westphalen; Rudolph Victor von Westphalen; Joseph Clemens von Westphalen
- Father: Clemens August von Westphalen
- Mother: Theresia Isabella von Brabeck

Clemens August, Freiherr von Westphalen zu Fürstenberg (Reichsgraf from 1792; 12 January 1753 – 26 December 1818) was a German aristocrat who held numerous offices in various North-West German Bishoprics and served as Minister of State of the Electorate of Mainz and Imperial Envoy.

== Early life ==
Westphalen was born on 12 January 1753 in Paderborn into the von Westphalen zu Fürstenberg family, a Westphalian noble family. He was the son of Theresia Isabella von Brabeck (1731–1754), who died shortly after his birth, and Clemens August von Westphalen (1726–178), the Prince-Bishop of Paderborn's Master of the Horse (an official corresponding to the Crown Equerry in England). After his mother's death in 1754, his father married Maria Antonia Waldbott von Bassenheimn. From that marriage, he had a half-sister, Maria Anna von Westphalen zu Fürstenberg (wife of Baron Clemens August Bruno von Mengersen, Privy Councillor and Lord Marshal of the Princes of Hildesheim and Paderborn).

His paternal grandparents were Wilhelm Ferdinand Joseph von Westphalen zu Fürstenberg and Anna Helene Von Westphalen zu Fürstenberg zu Hindenburg.

== Career ==
In the Bishoprics of Hildesheim, Paderborn and Osnabrück, he held the Hereditary honorary offices of Hereditary Butler (Cupbearer) and Hereditary Master of the Hunt. He was a Wirklicher Geheimer Rat (equivalent to Active Privy Councillor in the Russian Empire) and Master of the Horse in Hildesheim and Paderborn. He was also a representative of the state parliament of the Bishopric of Paderborn. In this territory, he was the Landdrost and Drost of the Liebenburg and Hunnesrück offices. He was also the Minister of State of the Electorate of Mainz and, as such, the second Ambassador in the 1790 imperial election following the death of Emperor Joseph II. He was also responsible for General Imperial, District, Judicial and Police Affairs.

Clemens August was also Imperial and Royal Chamberlain and Privy Councillor. For many years he was Imperial Envoy with the rank of Minister Plenipotentiary at the Courts of the Electors of Cologne and Trier as well as at the Lower Rhenish–Westphalian Circle. At the beginning of the Coalition Wars, he tried in vain to urge the Imperial Circle to actively prepare for war. In 1792, Emperor Leopold II elevated him to the rank of Imperial Count for his services. In 1801, he brought the Aachen Imperial Regalia, Coronation Gospels, St. Stephen's Purse and Charlemagne's Sabre from Aachen to Vienna.

=== Property and estates ===
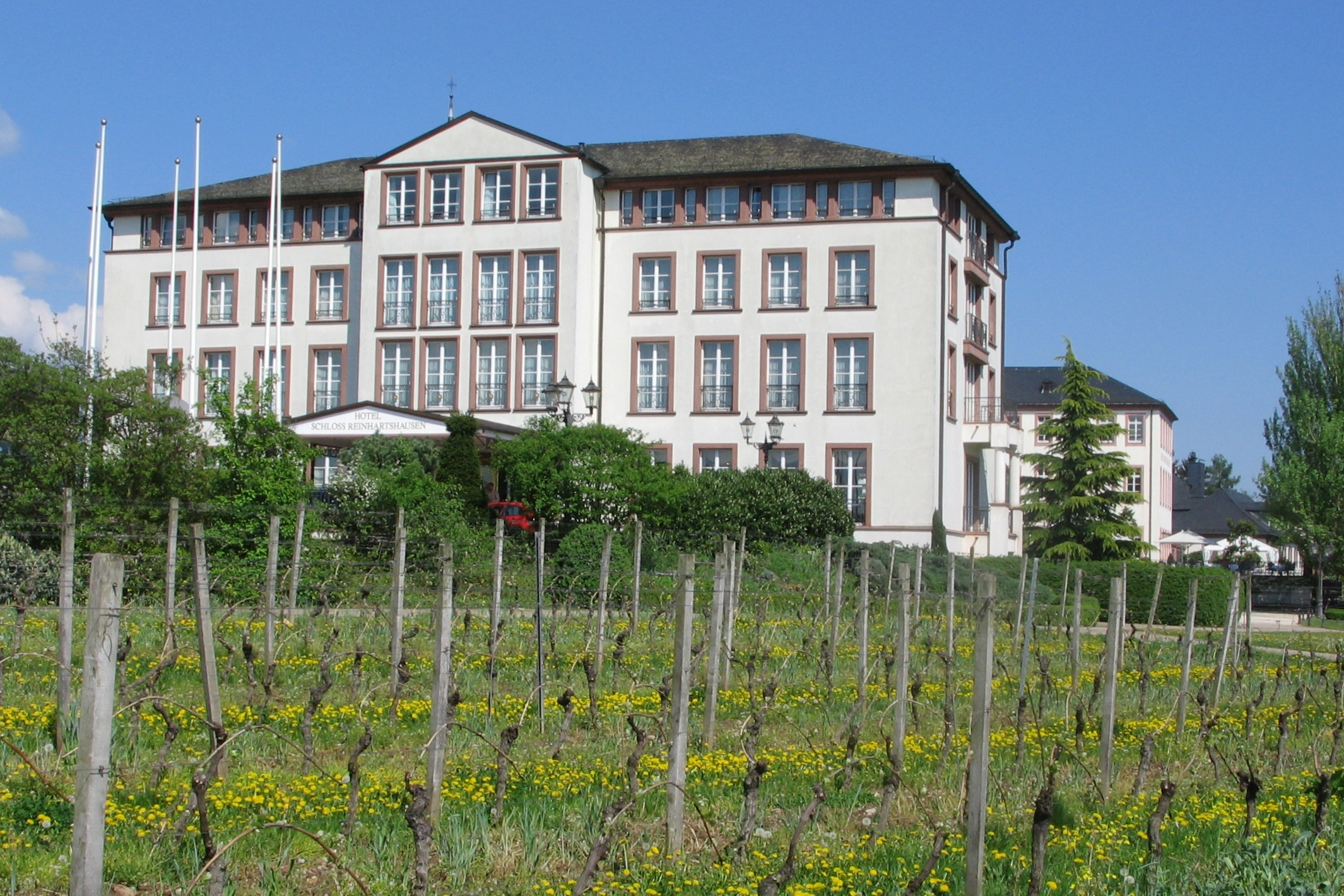
The Reinhartshausen Castle and winery in Erbach

Westphalen took over the family estates in 1778 and was able to increase the family's wealth considerably, as he was the sole heir of the Prince-Bishops Wilhelm Anton von der Asseburg, his great-uncle on his mother's side, and Friedrich Wilhelm von Westphalen, his uncle on his father's side. The latter left behind a fortune of 900,000 thalers. He expanded the property by purchasing land including the Rixdorf estate near Eutin.

From 1779, he was Burgmann at the Imperial Castle in Friedberg. From 1783 Regimental Burgmann and, from 1805, the last Burgrave of the Burgraviate of Friedberg and Grand Prior of the Order of St. Joseph. In 1801, he acquired the Reinhartshausen Castle and winery in Erbach and parts of Mariannenaue, the largest Rhine island on the Middle Rhine between Erbach and Hattenheim. The estate had been owned by the Rhenish noble family Langwerth von Simmern (who had acquired it from the Knights of Allendorf of 1797). Westphalen had the Knight's seat demolished and built the Castle, which survives today. (Note: Princess Marianne of the Netherlands (wife of Prince Albert of Prussia) acquired the estate in 1855 and, in 1896, the river island in front of Schloss Reinhartshausen was renamed Mariannenaue in honor of her by the estate's then owner, Princess Marianne's son Prince Albert of Prussia.) From 1801 he had the castle built in its current form.

== Personal life ==
In 1778, he married Countess Maria Antonia Waldbott von Bassenheim (1757–1786), the daughter of Count Johann Maria Rudolph Waldbott von Bassenheim and Baroness Eleonora Walburgis Ernesta von Hoheneck. Before her death in 1786, they were the parents of five children, including:

- Friedrich Wilhelm von Westphalen zu Fürstenberg (1780–1809), who married Countess Elisabeth von Thun und Hohenstein, a daughter of Count Wenzel Joseph Johann von Thun und Hohenstein.
- Fernandine von Westphalen zu Fürstenberg (1781–1813), who married Count Franz Erwein von Schönborn-Wiesentheid.
- Marie Antoinette Franziska von Westphalen zu Fürstenberg (1783–1867), who married Friedrich Carl Joseph von Ingelheim.
- Rudolph Victor von Westphalen zu Fürstenberg (1784–1868), who married Baroness Caroline von Lützow.
- Joseph Clemens von Westphalen zu Fürstenberg (1785–1863), who married his brother's widow, Countess Elisabeth von Thun und Hohenstein.

In his second marriage he married Maria Theresia von Bocholtz in 1788. This marriage remained childless.

Count von Westphalen died on 26 December 1818 in Frankfurt am Main.
