= Johannes Jährig =

German translator (1747–1795)

Johannes Jährig (17 March 1747 in Herrnhaag – 26 June 1795 in Saint Petersburg) was a German Mongolist and translator of Tibetan and Mongolian texts.
