= List of ambassadors of Austria to the United States =

Ambassadors of Austria to the United States

Ambassador of the Republic of Austria to the United States
- Coat of arms of Austria

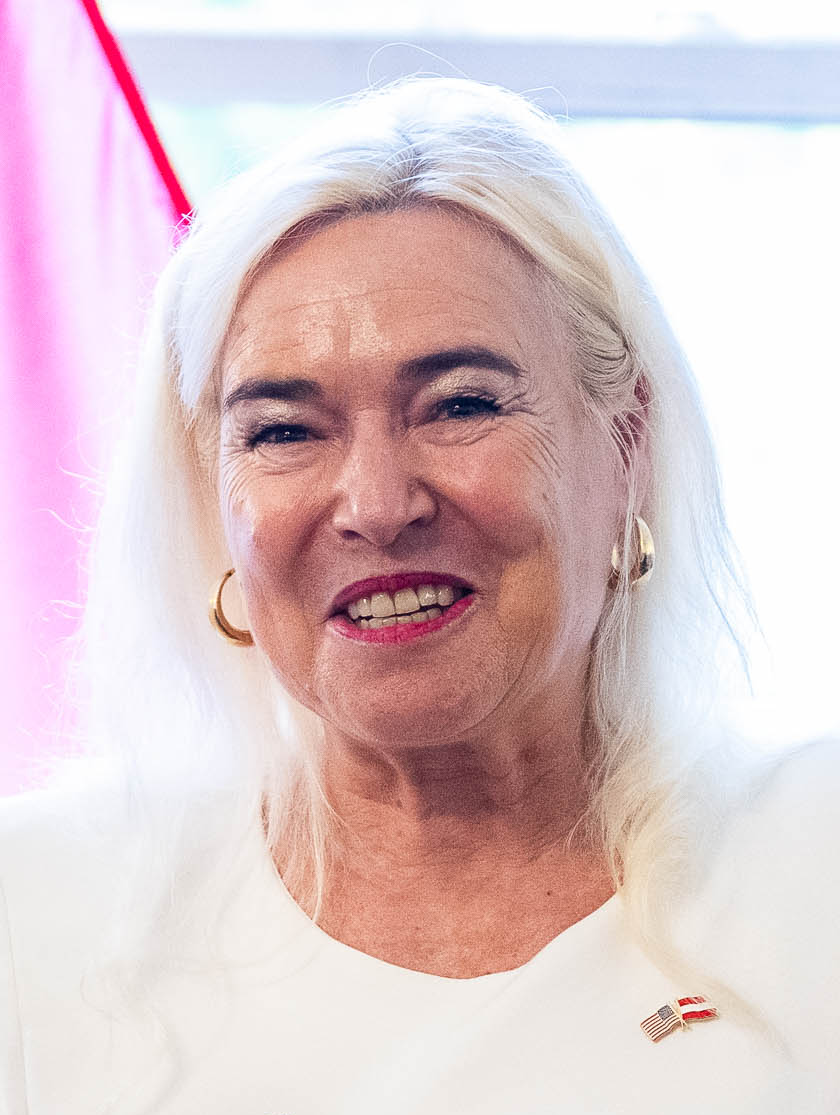
- Incumbent; Petra Schneebauer since 2023
- Ministry of Foreign Affairs; Embassy of Austria, Washington D.C.
- Style: Her Excellency
- Inaugural holder: Wenzel von Mareschall (as Ambassador of the Austrian Empire)
- Formation: 1838
- Website: Austrian Embassy, Washington D.C.

This is a list of ambassadors of Austria to the United States.

== History ==
The United States first established diplomatic relations with Austria in 1838 during the time of the Austrian Empire. Relations between the United States have been continuous since that time except for two interruptions during World War I and World War II.

As part of the modernization of the state system in the 1860s, Austria-Hungary began to send permanent envoys to the United States. After 11 November 1918, these were no longer representatives of the Emperor, but of the republican state of German-Austria or the Austrian Republic, who were now called ambassadors. On 13 March 1938, the Austrian representation in Washington, D.C. was closed due to the "Anschluss" to Nazi Germany and only reopened one and a half years after the re-establishment of the Republic of Austria following the end of World War II.

The fact that diplomatic relations were not resumed until November 1946 reflects the fact that the United States, as the occupying power in Austria, had a high-ranking presence in Vienna since 1 September 1945, and the four occupying powers considered themselves the supreme authority in Austria. It was not until the summer of 1946 that the government of Leopold Figl was given more political leeway.

The Austrian Embassy in the United States is located in Washington, D.C.

== Heads of Mission ==
=== Ambassadors of the Austrian Empire ===
Term Start	Term End	Name	Title	Notes
1838	1841	Wenzel von Mareschall		
1841	1855	Johann von Hülsemann	Chargé d'Affaires	August Belmont served as Consul-General from 1844 to 1850.
1855	1868	Johann von Hülsemann	Imperial and Royal Envoy Extraordinary and Minister Plenipotentiary	August Belmont served as Consul-General from 1844 to 1850.
1863	1864	Nikolaus von Giorgi	Imperial and Royal Envoy Extraordinary and Minister Plenipotentiary	
1865	1867	Ferdinand von Wydenbruck	Imperial and Royal Envoy Extraordinary and Minister Plenipotentiary	

=== Ambassadors of the Austro-Hungarian Empire ===
Term Start	Term End	Image	Name	Title	Notes
1867	1868		Karl von und zu Franckenstein	Chargé d'Affaires	
1868	1874		Karl von Lederer	Imperial and Royal Envoy Extraordinary and Minister Plenipotentiary	Previously Ambassador to the Hanseatic Cities in Hamburg
1874	1875		Wilhelm von Schwarz-Senborn	Imperial and Royal Envoy Extraordinary and Minister Plenipotentiary	Previously General Director of the 1873 Vienna World's Fair
1875	1878		Ladislaus von Hoyos-Sprinzenstein	Imperial and Royal Envoy Extraordinary and Minister Plenipotentiary	Later Ambassador to France in Paris
1878	1881		Ernst von Mayr	Imperial and Royal Envoy Extraordinary and Minister Plenipotentiary	
1881	1886		Ignaz von Schäffer	Imperial and Royal Envoy Extraordinary and Minister Plenipotentiary	
1887	1894		Ernst Schmit von Tavera	Imperial and Royal Envoy Extraordinary and Minister Plenipotentiary	
1894	1902		Ladislaus Hengelmüller von Hengervár	Imperial and Royal Envoy Extraordinary and Minister Plenipotentiary	Previously Austro-Hungarian Minister to Brazil and Serbia
1902	1913		Ladislaus Hengelmüller von Hengervár	Ambassador Extraordinary and Plenipotentiary	Previously Austro-Hungarian Minister to Brazil and Serbia
1913	1915		Konstantin Dumba	Ambassador Extraordinary and Plenipotentiary	Dumba was declared persona non grata by the U.S. Government on 8 September 1915 and left the U.S. on 5 October, however, his appointment formally ended a month later.
1916	1917		Adam Tarnówski von Tarnów	Ambassador Extraordinary and Plenipotentiary	Count Tarnowski was named ambassador following Dumba's expulsion and arrived in Washington in 1916 but never presented his credentials to President Wilson. Therefore, his name therefore does not appear in the U.S. records and the legation is said to have been led by Erich Zwiedinek von Südenhorst as Chargé d'affaires until the embassy was closed and diplomatic relations were officially broken off on 8 April 1917. The United States did not formally declare war on Austria-Hungary until 7 December 1917.
Interruption in relations due to World War I

=== Ambassadors of the First Austrian Republic ===
Term Start	Term End	Image	Name	Title	Notes
1921	1925		Edgar L. G. Prochnik	Chargés d'affaires ad interim	
1925	1938		Edgar L. G. Prochnik	Envoy Extraordinary and Minister Plenipotentiary	Terminated mission due to Anschluss with Germany
Interruption in relations due to World War II

=== Ambassadors of the Second Austrian Republic ===
Term Start	Term End	Image	Name	Title	Notes
1946	1951		Ludwig Kleinwächter	Envoy Extraordinary and Minister Plenipotentiary	Previously Consul in New York City, Buffalo, and Chicago and Counselor at the Legation in Washington, as well as Consul General to Ottawa. In 1938, the Gestapo arrested him as a "half Jew" and sent him to Dachau and Buchenwald concentration camps.
1951	1952		Ludwig Kleinwächter	Ambassador Extraordinary and Plenipotentiary	Previously Consul in New York City, Buffalo, and Chicago and Counselor at the Legation in Washington, as well as Consul General to Ottawa. In 1938, the Gestapo arrested him as a "half Jew" and sent him to Dachau and Buchenwald concentration camps.
1952	1954		Max Löwenthal	Ambassador Extraordinary and Plenipotentiary	Later Ambassador in Ottawa, Buenos Aires, and Rome
1954	1957		Karl Gruber	Ambassador Extraordinary and Plenipotentiary	Previously Foreign Minister of Austria from 1945 to 1953
1958	1965		Wilfried Platzer	Ambassador Extraordinary and Plenipotentiary	
1965	1969		Ernst Lemberger	Ambassador Extraordinary and Plenipotentiary	
1969	1972		Karl Gruber	Ambassador Extraordinary and Plenipotentiary	Second term
1972	1977		Arno Halusa	Ambassador Extraordinary and Plenipotentiary	
1977	1982		Karl Herbert Schober	Ambassador Extraordinary and Plenipotentiary	
1982	1987		Thomas Klestil	Ambassador Extraordinary and Plenipotentiary	Later served as President of Austria from 1992 to 2004
1987	1993		Friedrich Hoess	Ambassador Extraordinary and Plenipotentiary	
1993	1999		Helmut Tuerk	Ambassador Extraordinary and Plenipotentiary	
1999	2003		Peter Moser	Ambassador Extraordinary and Plenipotentiary	
2003	2009		Eva Nowotny	Ambassador Extraordinary and Plenipotentiary	Formerly Ambassador to France, and to the Court of St. James's (United Kingdom)
2009	2011		Christian Prosl	Ambassador Extraordinary and Plenipotentiary	
2011	2015		Hans Peter Manz	Ambassador Extraordinary and Plenipotentiary	Formerly Ambassador to Switzerland
2016	2019		Wolfgang Waldner	Ambassador Extraordinary and Plenipotentiary	Formerly State Secretary for European and International Affairs, Minister in charge of Commerce, Agriculture, Forestry, Tourism, Culture and Communities for the Regional Government of Carinthia, and Ambassador to Hungary.
2019	2022		Martin Weiss	Ambassador Extraordinary and Plenipotentiary	Formerly Ambassador to Israel, Director of the Press and Information Department of the Foreign Ministry, and Ambassador to Cyprus.
2023	Present		Petra Schneebauer	Ambassador Extraordinary and Plenipotentiary	Formerly Director-General for Consular Affairs at the Austrian Foreign Ministry and Austrian National Coordinator and leader of the Task Force for the Combat of Human Trafficking.

== See also ==
- Austria–United States relations
- United States Ambassador to Austria
- Foreign relations of Austria
