= Michael Linhart =

Austrian diplomat & politician (born 1958)

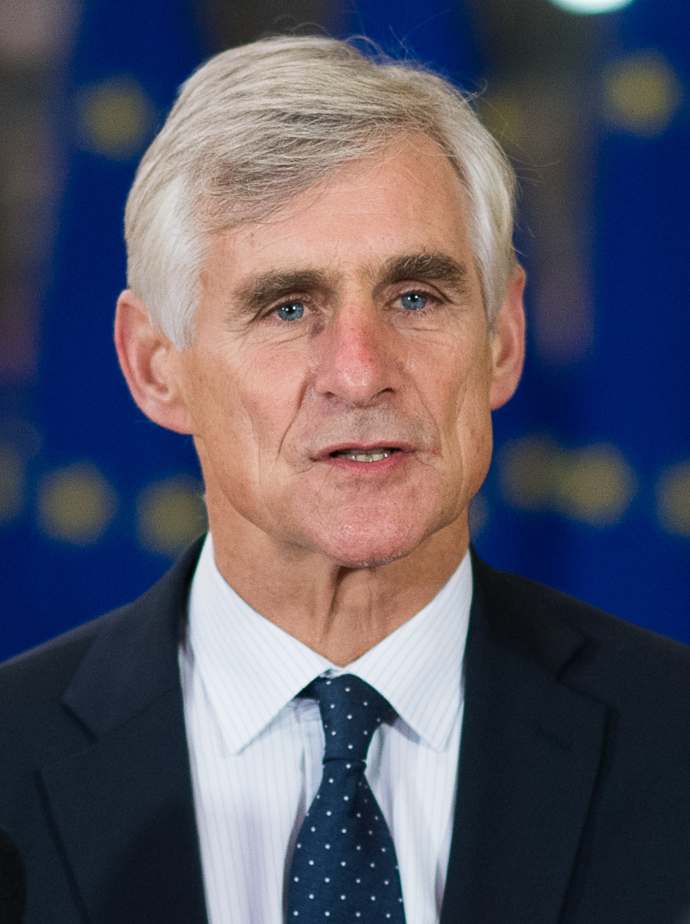
- Linhart in 2021

Minister of Foreign Affairs
- In office 11 October – 6 December 2021
- Chancellor: Alexander Schallenberg
- Preceded by: Alexander Schallenberg
- Succeeded by: Alexander Schallenberg

Secretary-General at the Federal Ministry for Europe, Integration and Foreign Affairs
- In office 2 December 2013 – 1 June 2018
- Minister: Michael Spindelegger; Sebastian Kurz; Karin Kneissl
- Preceded by: Johannes Kyrle
- Succeeded by: Johannes Peterlik

Managing Director of the Austrian Development Agency
- In office 2003–2007
- Preceded by: Office established
- Succeeded by: Brigitte Öppinger-Walchshofer

Personal details
- Born: 31 August 1958 (age 67) Ankara, Turkey
- Education: University of Salzburg; University of Vienna

Michael Linhart (Austrian German pronunciation: [ˈmɪçaeːl ˈlɪnhart]; born 31 August 1958) is an Austrian diplomat and politician who was appointed as the new Austrian Ambassador at Berlin on 15 December 2021. Before that, he served as minister of foreign affairs of the Republic of Austria in the Schallenberg government from 11 October to 6 December 2021, ambassador of the Republic of Austria to France from 2018 to 2021 and Secretary-General at the Federal Ministry for Europe, Integration and Foreign Affairs from 2013 to 2018.

== Early life ==
Michael Linhart was born on 31 August 1958 in Ankara, Turkey, where his father was a diplomat at the Austrian embassy. He attended high school in Feldkirch, Vorarlberg and graduated in 1976. After spending a year in the Austrian Armed Forces for military service, he began reading law in the University of Salzburg and the University of Vienna in 1977. Linhart received his doctorate degree in law in Vienna in 1985 and was qualified for legal practice in the same year.

== Diplomatic career ==
In 1986, Michael Linhart joined the diplomatic service in the Foreign Ministry and was deployed to the Austrian Embassy in Addis Ababa, Ethiopia. Two years later he became first secretary and was transferred to Damascus, Syria, assuming the role of deputy head of the embassy. He then was promoted to counsellor in 1992 and was sent to Zagreb, Croatia where he remained until 1995.

Linhart returned to Vienna in August 1995 as the private secretary to the Foreign Minister Wolfgang Schüssel. When Schüssel became Chancellor in 2000, Linhart was appointed his advisor on foreign policy as well as the Austrian Ambassador to Syria. From 2003 to 2007, he was the managing director of the new Austrian Development Agency under the Foreign Ministry. Afterwards, Linhart became the Austrian Ambassador to Greece until 2012 when he returned to Austria as the section head for development cooperation in the Foreign Ministry. On 2 December 2013, Linhart was appointed the Secretary-General in the Foreign Ministry but was replaced on 1 June 2018. He then became the Austrian Ambassador to France in summer 2018, replacing the retiring Walter Grahammer.

== Foreign minister ==
On 11 October 2021, Linhart was sworn in as Foreign Minister by President Alexander Van der Bellen as the successor to Alexander Schallenberg, who was appointed the new Austrian Chancellor on the same day. After the resignation of Chancellor Sebastian Kurz, Schallenberg succeeded him as head of government and, in his first official act, proposed Linhart as his successor in the Foreign Ministry.

In his first speech to the National Council on 12 October 2021, Linhart described his guiding principles as 'dialogue and commitment with a clear course of action for the country'. Saying that crises and conflicts across the world 'would not take a break' which was why under his leadership Austrian diplomacy would not come to a stop, he also reiterated the importance of a 'strong European Union' and a close relationship with other EU member states.

== Personal life ==
Linhart has two daughters and a son. His younger brother Markus Linhart is a People's Party politician who served as the mayor of Bregenz from 1998 to 2020.

Diplomatic posts
Preceded by Robert Karas	Austrian Ambassador to Syria; 2000–2003	Succeeded by Karl Schramek
Preceded by Herbert Kröll	Austrian Ambassador to Greece; 2007–2012	Succeeded by Melitta Schubert
Preceded by Walter Grahammer	Austrian Ambassador to France; 2018–2021	Succeeded by Barbara Kaudel-Jensen
Preceded by Peter Huber	Austrian Ambassador to Germany; 2021–present	Incumbent
Political offices
Preceded by Alexander Schallenberg	Foreign Minister of Austria; 2021–2021	Succeeded by Alexander Schallenberg
