= The Knifegrinder =

The Knifegrinder refers to various paintings:

- The Knifegrinder (Goya), a painting by Francisco de Goya
- The Knifegrinder (Malevich), a cubo-futurist painting by Kazimir Malevich

== See also ==
- Knifegrinder
