= Alajos Károlyi =

Austro-Hungarian Diplomat

Count Alajos Károlyi de Nagykároly
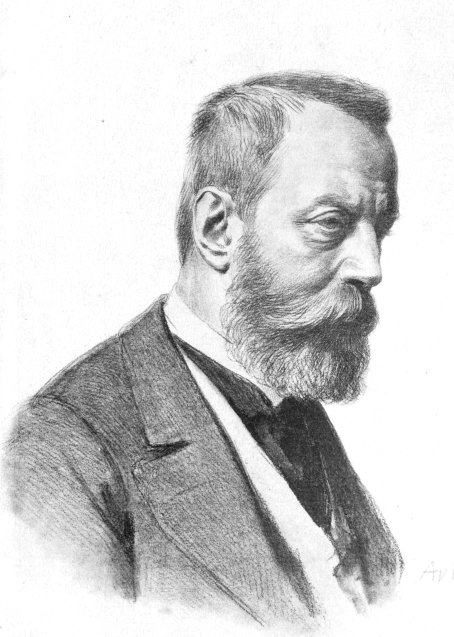

Ambassador Extraordinary and Plenipotentiary to the United Kingdom
- In office 3 November 1878 – 20 June 1888
- Monarch: William I
- Chancellor: Otto von Bismarck
- Preceded by: Friedrich Ferdinand von Beust
- Succeeded by: Franz Deym von Střítež

Ambassador Extraordinary and Plenipotentiary to the German Empire
- In office 10 December 1871 – 3 November 1878
- Monarch: William I
- Chancellor: Otto von Bismarck
- Preceded by: Alois Kübeck von Kübau (as Ambassador to the German Confederation)
- Succeeded by: Emmerich Széchényi

Member of the House of Magnates
- In office 13 May 1885 – 26 December 1889

Personal details
- Born: 8 August 1825 Vienna, Austrian Empire
- Died: 2 December 1889 (aged 64) Tótmegyer, Austria-Hungary
- Spouse: Fanni Erdődy
- Relations: Aloys von Kaunitz-Rietberg (grandfather)
- Children: 4

Count Alajos Károlyi de Nagykároly (8 August 1825 – 2 December 1889) was an Austro-Hungarian diplomat.

== Early life ==
He was born in Vienna on 8 August 1825. He was the of son Count Ludwig Károlyi de Nagykároly (1799–1863) and Countess Ferdinandine von Kaunitz-Rietberg (1805–1862).

His maternal grandparents were Prince Aloys von Kaunitz-Rietberg and the former Countess Franziska Xaveria Ungnad von Weissenwolff. His paternal grandparents were Count József Károlyi de Nagykároly and the former Countess Maria Elisabeth von Waldstein-Wartenberg (sister to Countess Maria Antonia von Waldstein, both daughters of Count Georg Christian von Waldstein and Countess Elisabeth Ulfeldt). His family, a part of the Hungarian nobility, had been prominent since the time of Sándor Károlyi (1668–1743), one of the generals of Francis II Rákóczi, who in 1711 negotiated the peace of Szatmár between the insurgent Hungarians and the new king, the emperor Charles VI, was made a count of the Empire in 1712, and subsequently became a field marshal in the imperial army.

== Career ==
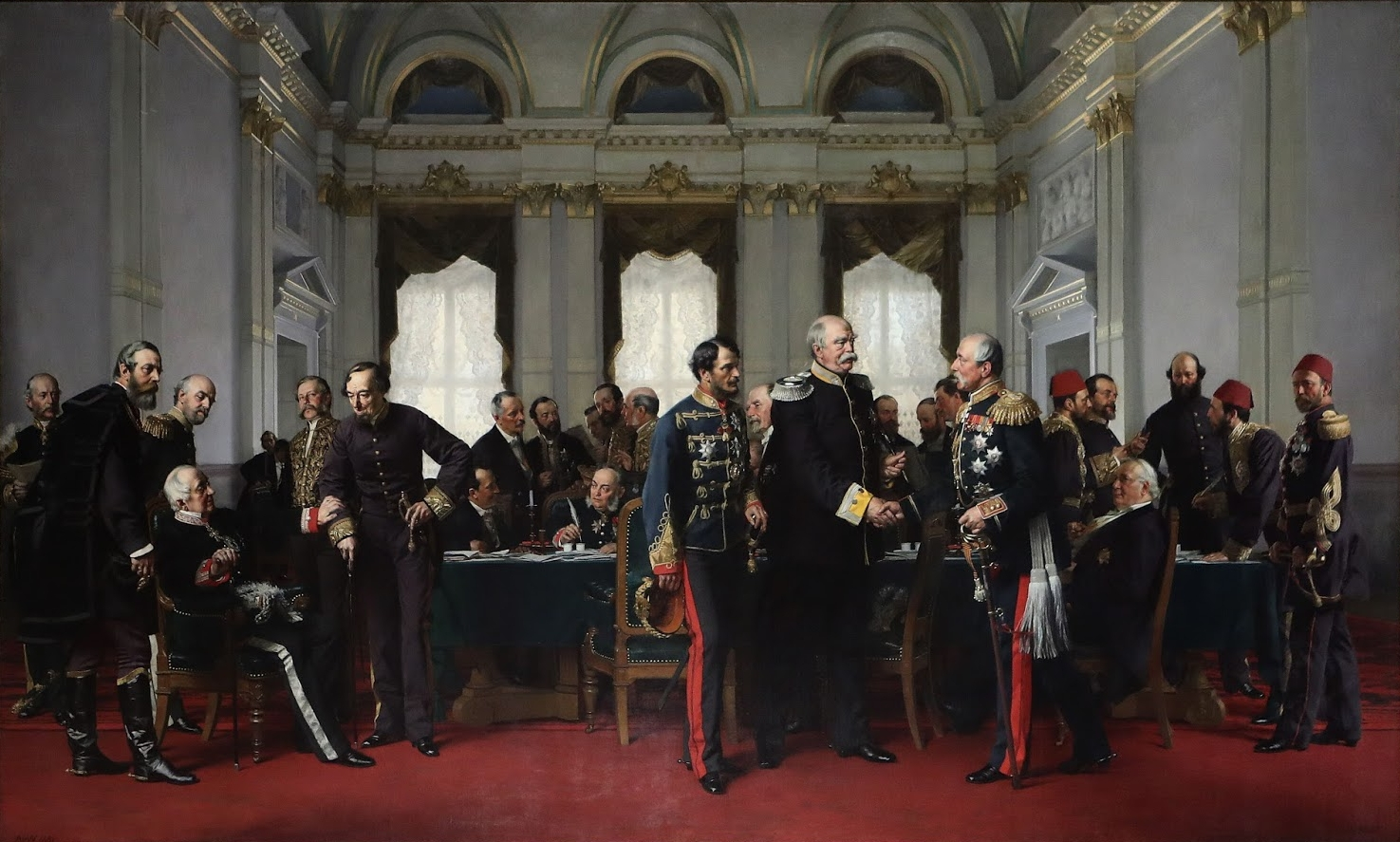
Count Károlyi (2nd from left) during the Berlin Congress, painting by Anton von Werner, 1881

At the age of 19, Károlyi entered the Austrian diplomatic service and, in 1845, became an attaché to the Berlin embassy. He was assigned successively to Austrian embassies at various European capitals; from 1853 at the diplomatic mission in London. In 1858 he was sent to Saint Petersburg on a special mission to seek the support of Russia in the threatening Franco-Austrian War against Napoleon III.

Károlyi was appointed Envoy Extraordinary at Berlin in 1866 at the time of the rupture between Prussia and Austria, and after the Seven Weeks War was responsible for the negotiation of the preliminaries of peace at Nikolsburg. Under Chancellor Otto von Bismarck, he was again sent to Berlin in 1871, acted as second plenipotentiary at the Berlin congress of 1878. In January 1864, he wrote to the Austrian Foreign Minister, Count Johann Bernhard von Rechberg und Rothenlöwen:

"the surest sign not only of the political but of the social divisiveness which is inherent in the internal life of the Prussian state, to wit, the passionate hatred of different estates and classes for each other. This antagonism... which places in sharp opposition the army and the nobility on one hand and all the other industrious citizens on the other is one of the most significant and darkest characteristics of the Prussian Monarchy."

In 1878, Károlyi was sent in the same year to London, where he represented Austria for ten years.

For his diplomatic efforts, he was awarded the Order of the Golden Fleece. Upon his death, his insignia of the Order was returned to the Emperor, before it was awarded to his kinsman Sándor Károlyi by Franz Joseph I, as it could only be held by one member of a family at the same time.

=== Stomfa Castle ===
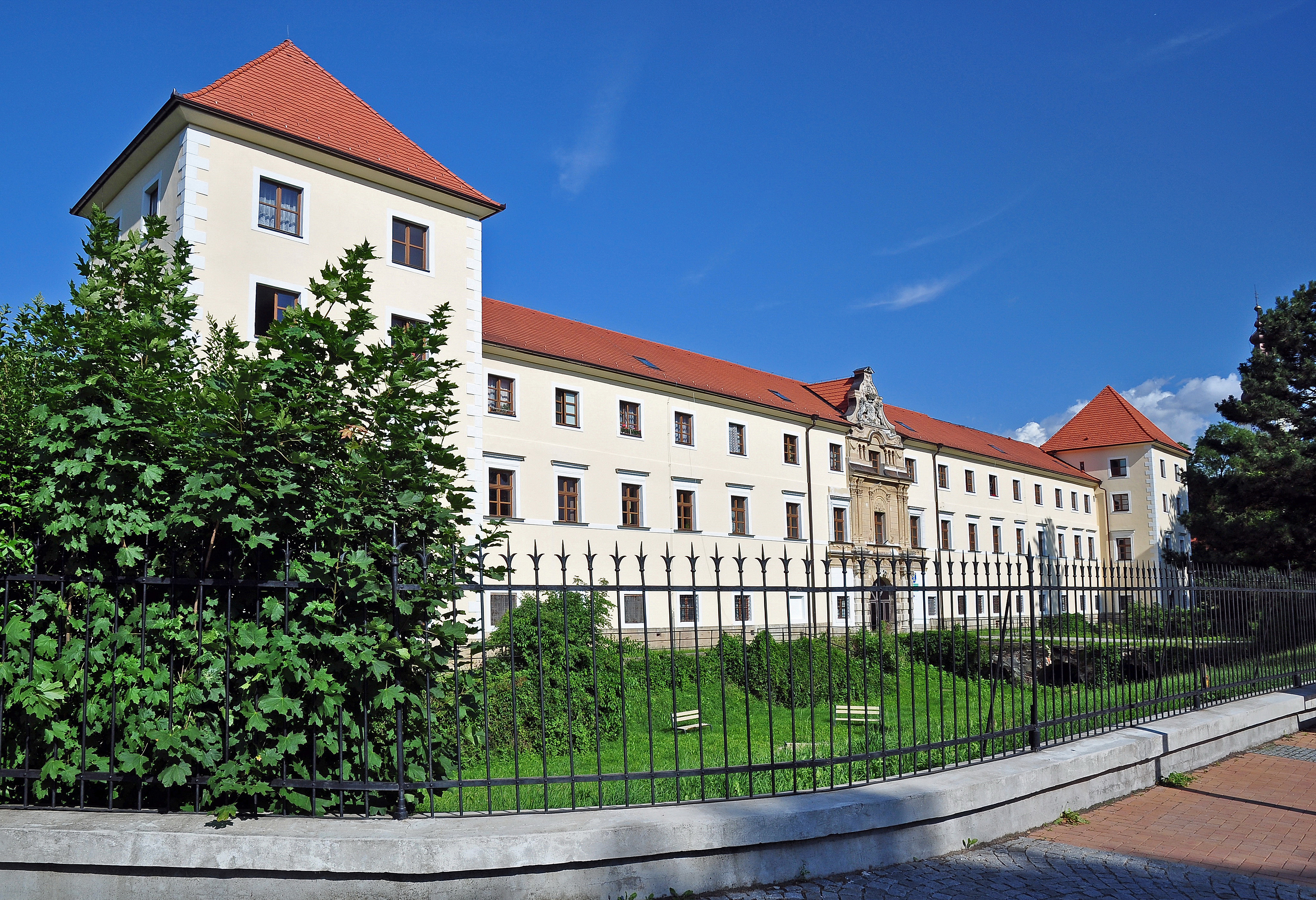
Stomfa Castle

In 1870, Károlyi remodeled Stomfa Castle, the 17th century Renaissance style castle built by the Pálffys on the site of a former moated castle. Károlyi had the renowned Hungarian architect Miklós Ybl add a German renaissance style wing with towers and rebuilt the manor house in the Romantic style. Ybl connected the side buildings with the manor house with an open arcade floor. Also added was an English style garden with a central pond. After his death, the castle passed to his son, Count Lajos Károlyi, who undertook his own remodel of the castle, carried out by Arthur Meinig.

== Personal life ==
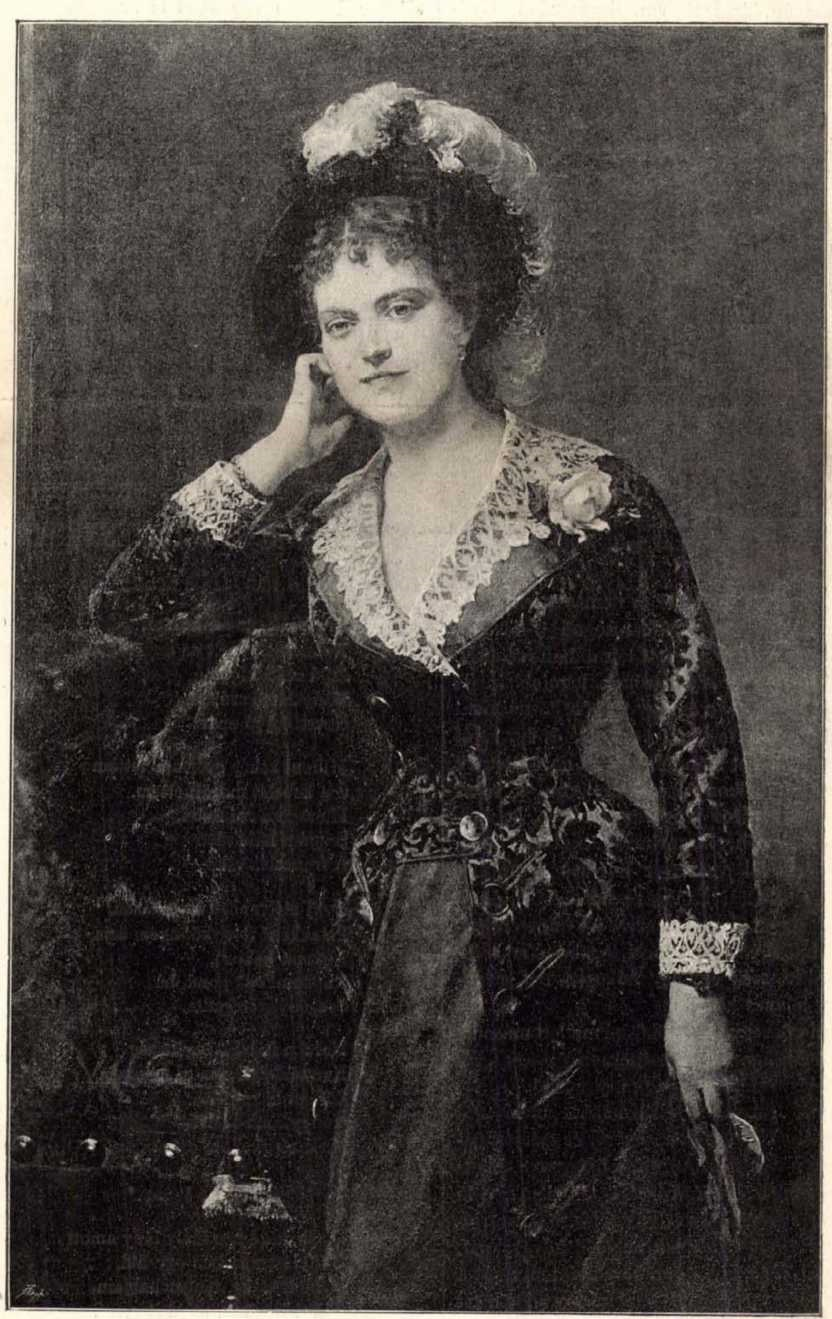
Portrait of his wife (née Countess Fanny Erdődy), by Gustav Richter, 1894

Károlyi married Countess Franciska "Fanni" Gobertina Erdödy de Monyorókerék et Monoszló (1842–1927), a daughter of Count Lajos Erdõdy de Monyorókerék et Monoszló and Johanna Raymann. Together, they had four children, including:

- Countess Ferdinandine "Nandine" Johanna Nepomucena Károlyi de Nagykároly (1868–1955), who married Count Leopold Berchtold von und zu Ungarschitz, a son of Count Sigismund Berchtold von und zu Ungarschitz, Frättling und Püllütz, in 1893.
- Count Lajos Lörinc Károlyi de Nagykároly (1872–1965), who married his cousin, Countess Hanna Széchényi von Sárvár-Felsövideki, a daughter of Count Béla Széchenyi von Sárvár-Felsövidék (a "personal friend" of King Edward VII) and Countess Johanna "Janka" Goberta Erdödy.
- Countess Zsófia "Sophie" Anna Károlyi de Nagykároly (1875–1972), who married Imre Gyorgy Károlyi de Nagykároly, a son of Count Tibor Johann Nepomucen Justin Károlyi de Nagykároly.

He died on 2 December 1889 at Tótmegyer Castle, in what is today known as Palárikovo in Slovakia.

=== Descendants ===
Through his daughter Countess Nandine, he was a grandfather of Count Aloys "Louis" Berchtold von und zu Ungarschitz (1894–1977), and Count Sigismund "Sziga" Berchtold von und zu Ungarschitz (1900–1979), who married Eva Machan (former wife of Count Leopold zu Hardegg auf Glatz und im Machlande), Countess Etti von Wurmbrand-Stuppach (former wife of Clendenin J. Ryan, Count Paul Pálffy ab Erdöd, Count Tamás Esterházy, who after her divorce from Sigismund married William Deering Davis and then Árpád Plesch), and Emilia de Gosztonyi (former wife of Michael Bankier and Robin Alexander Lyle, who after her divorce from Sigismund married Prince Vsevolod Ivanovich of Russia).

Through his son Count Lajos, he was a grandfather of Count Sándor Béla Károlyi de Nagykároly (1904–1987), who married Baroness Martha Sennyey de Kis-Sennye, and Countess Alice Sarolta Károlyi de Nagykároly (1905–1981), who married Heinrich von Haugwitz.

Through his daughter Countess Sophie, he was a grandfather of Count Ferenc Gyula Károlyi de Nagykároly (1900–1973), Count Viktor Dénes Károlyi de Nagykároly (1902–1973) (who married Ilona Krisztina Széchenyi de Sárvár-Felsővidék), Count György Kálmán Károlyi de Nagykároly (1903–1969), Countess Maria Consuela Károlyi de Nagykároly (1905–1976) (who married Miklós Horthy Jr., son of the Regent of Hungary Miklós Horthy), and Count Gyula Lipót Károlyi de Nagykároly (1907–1942).
