= The Water Bearer (Goya) =

Painting by Francisco de Goya

The Water Bearer - Young Woman with a Pitcher
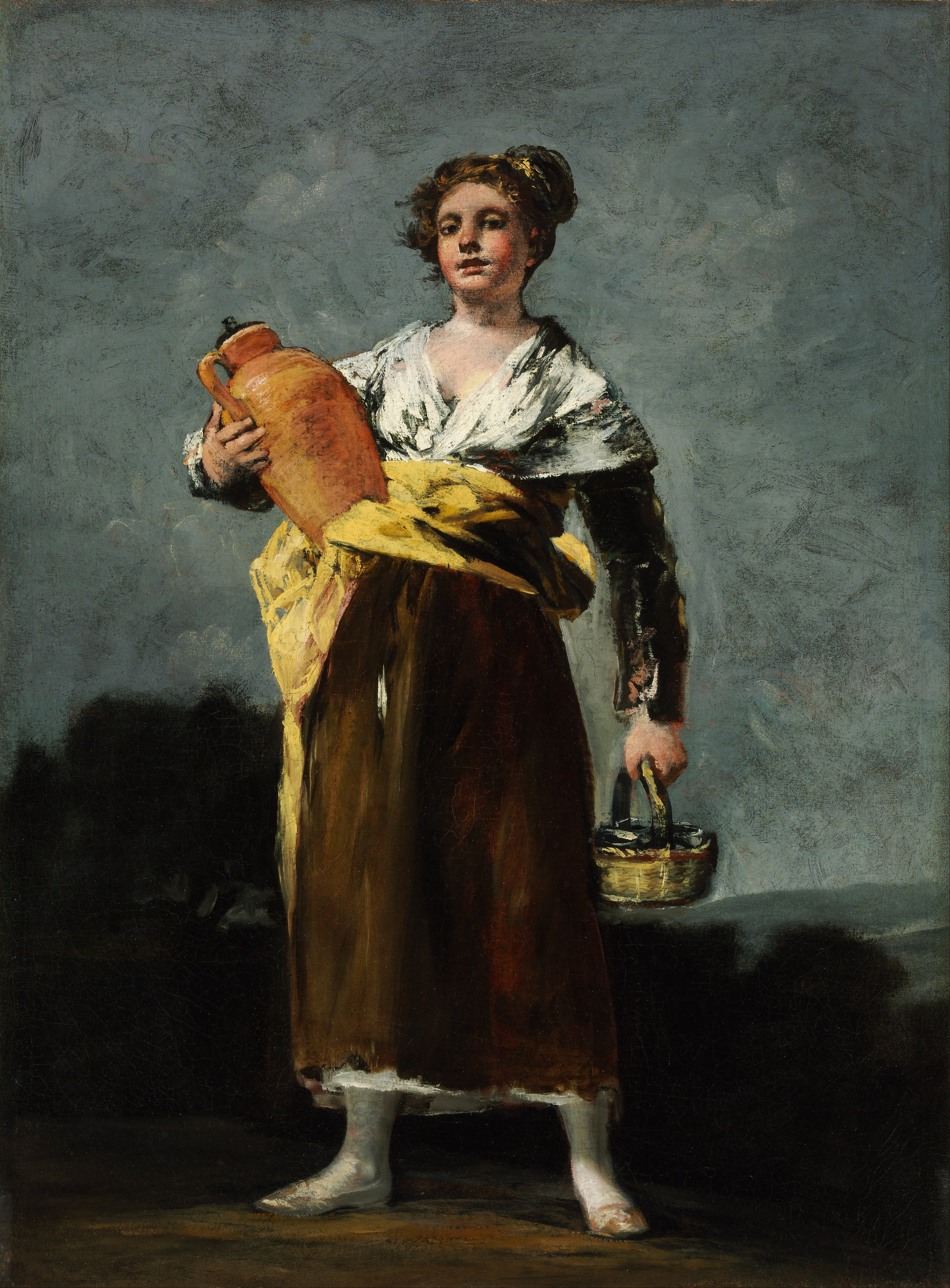
- Artist: Francisco de Goya
- Year: 1808–1812
- Medium: oil on canvas
- Dimensions: 69 cm × 50.5 cm (27 in × 19.9 in)
- Location: Museum of Fine Arts, Budapest

The Water Bearer is an oil-on-canvas painting by the Spanish artist Francisco de Goya, now in the Museum of Fine Arts in Budapest. The painting's Spanish title "La Aguadora" has also been translated as Young Woman with a Pitcher or the Water Carrier.

After a long period producing tapestry cartoons for the Royal Factory, where his works conformed to the court's rococo style, Goya started painting genre scenes. Works such as The Water Bearer, featuring working-class people, can be seen in the context of the Spanish resistance to French occupation in the War of Independence.

The art historian Juliet Wilson-Bareau has suggested that this work and its companion piece The Knifegrinder were painted to hang in the painter's house in Madrid. It was still in his possession in 1812. It was acquired by Alois Wenzel von Kaunitz-Rietberg, who served as the Austrian ambassador to Spain 1815–17.

== See also ==
- List of works by Francisco Goya

== Bibliography ==
- (in Spanish) Kazimierz Zawanowski, Francisco Goya y Lucientes, Varsovie, Arkady (W kręgu sztuki), 1975
- (in Spanish) Robert Hughes, Goya. Artysta i jego czas, Varsovie, WAB, 2006 (ISBN 83-7414-248-0, OCLC 569990350), p. 248, 76
- (in Spanish) Francisco Goya, Poznań, Oxford Educational, 2006 (ISBN 83-7425-497-1)
- (in Spanish) María Jesús Díaz (ed.), Goya, Madrid, Susaeta Ediciones, 2010 (ISBN 978-84-9928-021-9), p. 191
- (in Spanish) Clara Janés, Los genios de la pintura española: Goya, Madrid, SARPE, 1983 (ISBN 84-7700-100-6), p. 93
