= Ludwig Kleinwächter =

Austrian diplomat

Dr. Ludwig Kleinwaechter
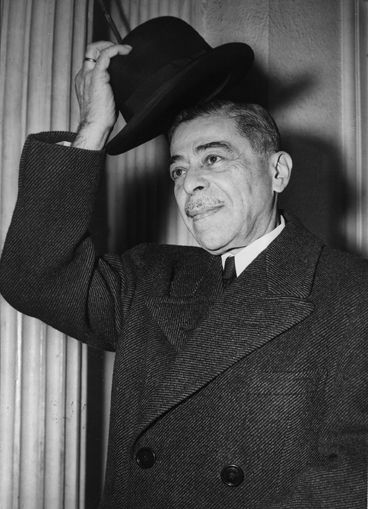
- Kleinwächter en route to the White House to present his credentials to President Truman, 4 December 1946

Austrian Ambassador to the United States
- In office 1946–1952
- Preceded by: Edgar L. G. Prochnik (as Minister of the First Austrian Republic)
- Succeeded by: Max Löwenthal

Personal details
- Born: 9 October 1882 Chernivtsi, Austria-Hungary
- Died: 12 March 1973 (aged 90) Vienna, Austria
- Education: Franz Josephs Universität
- Occupation: Diplomat

Ludwig von Kleinwächter (9 October 1882 – 12 March 1973) was an Austrian diplomat.

== Early life ==
Kleinwächter was born in Chernivtsi, Austria-Hungary (formerly the capital of the historic region of Bukovina; today a city in southwestern Ukraine on the Prut River). His father was the economist Friedrich von Kleinwächter, who was ennobled in 1909, and was originally from Prague. He was named after his uncle, Ludwig Kleinwächter, the prominent Austrian obstetrician and gynecologist.

After graduating from the Staatsgymnasium in Czernowitz in 1903, he studied law in Berlin and at the Franz Josephs Universität in Czernowitz (today known as Chernivtsi University), where he received his sub auspiciis promovierte in 1909. He then studied at the Consular Academy in Vienna.

== Career ==
In 1911 began a career as a diplomat in the Foreign Ministry of Austria-Hungary. From 1912 to 1916, he was consul in New York City and, in 1916, in Buffalo, New York. From June 1916 until the United States entered World War I in the spring of 1917, he served at the embassy in Washington. From December 1917 to February 1918, he was employed in the Saint Petersburg Prisoner of War Commission. From April 1918 to November 1918, he was head of the Civilian Internee Department in Kiev.

=== Post World War I ===
After the war, Kleinwächter again served as a diplomat for the Republic of Austria. In April and May 1921, he was a member of the delegation to the Conference of the Successor States to the Monarchy in Rome. In February 1922, he returned to the U.S. and was head of the consulate in Chicago until 1925 (appointed Consul General, 2nd Class, in 1924). From June 1925 to December 1926, he was counselor in the Austrian legation in Washington, D.C. After returning to Austria, he worked for several years for the Federal Press Service in Vienna, interrupted by a stay in Canada, where he headed the Consulate General in Ottawa from 1930 to 1932 (appointed Consul General, 1st Class, in 1931). During the time of the Federal State of Austria, Kleinwächter was a member of the Fatherland Front.

=== Post Anschluss ===
After the Anschluss of Austria to Hitler's Germany, he was dismissed from the diplomatic service and arrested on 12 March 1938 as a "half-Jew". On 2 April 1938, he was taken to Dachau concentration camp with the so-called celebrity transport, where he was given the prisoner number 13,904. On 23 September 1938, he was transferred to Buchenwald concentration camp, before being released on 3 May 1939. His dismissal from the diplomatic service was changed to a transfer into retirement with the award of half of his pension. In November 1939, he was detained by the Gestapo for 18 days. During the Nazi regime, he eked out a living with various odd jobs until the end of the war.

=== Post World War II ===
At the end of April 1945, he returned to Ballhausplatz and offered his services for the reconstruction of the Republic. Because of his experience as a diplomat in America, the Renner Provisional State Government appointed him Permanent Representative of the Ministry of Foreign Affairs to the American delegation of the Allied Commission for Austria. After the National Council elections in November 1945, the new Federal government under Chancellor Leopold Figl sent him as Envoy Extraordinary and Minister Plenipotentiary to Washington, where he arrived in February 1946. Together with his colleague Hans Thalberg, they rebuilt the Austrian embassy at first living out of a hotel. The writing paper they received in boxes from Vienna dated back to the Nazi era and bore the Swastika, so Kleinwächter and Thalberg burned it in the bathtub of their hotel room as a precaution. He presented his credentials to President Harry S. Truman in December 1946.

As Envoy, Kleinwächter soon began to spread the government's "victim doctrine" line to the American public, that is, the narrative of Austria as the "first victim" of Nazi aggression. The fact that both he and Thalberg had been persecuted by the Nazis helped. He successfully lobbied U.S. Secretary of State James F. Byrnes to support Austria's request for urgently needed UNRRA aid. After the UNRRA program ended in 1947, Kleinwächter managed to get Austria to receive special consideration in the subsequent Marshall Plan and to receive a large share of the aid funds.

Another of Kleinwächter's diplomatic successes was the signing of the first Fulbright Agreement between Austria and the United States in June 1950. In December 1951, shortly before his retirement, he was promoted to Ambassador. In accepting his updated credentials, President Truman "reaffirmed the intention of the Government to withdraw its occupation forces from Austria and to work for the restoration" of a free Austria. He was succeeded as Ambassador by Dr. Max Löwenthal-Chlumecky. From 1952, Kleinwächter was chairman of the Austro-American Institute of Education, founded in 1926 by Paul Leo Dengler.

== Personal life ==
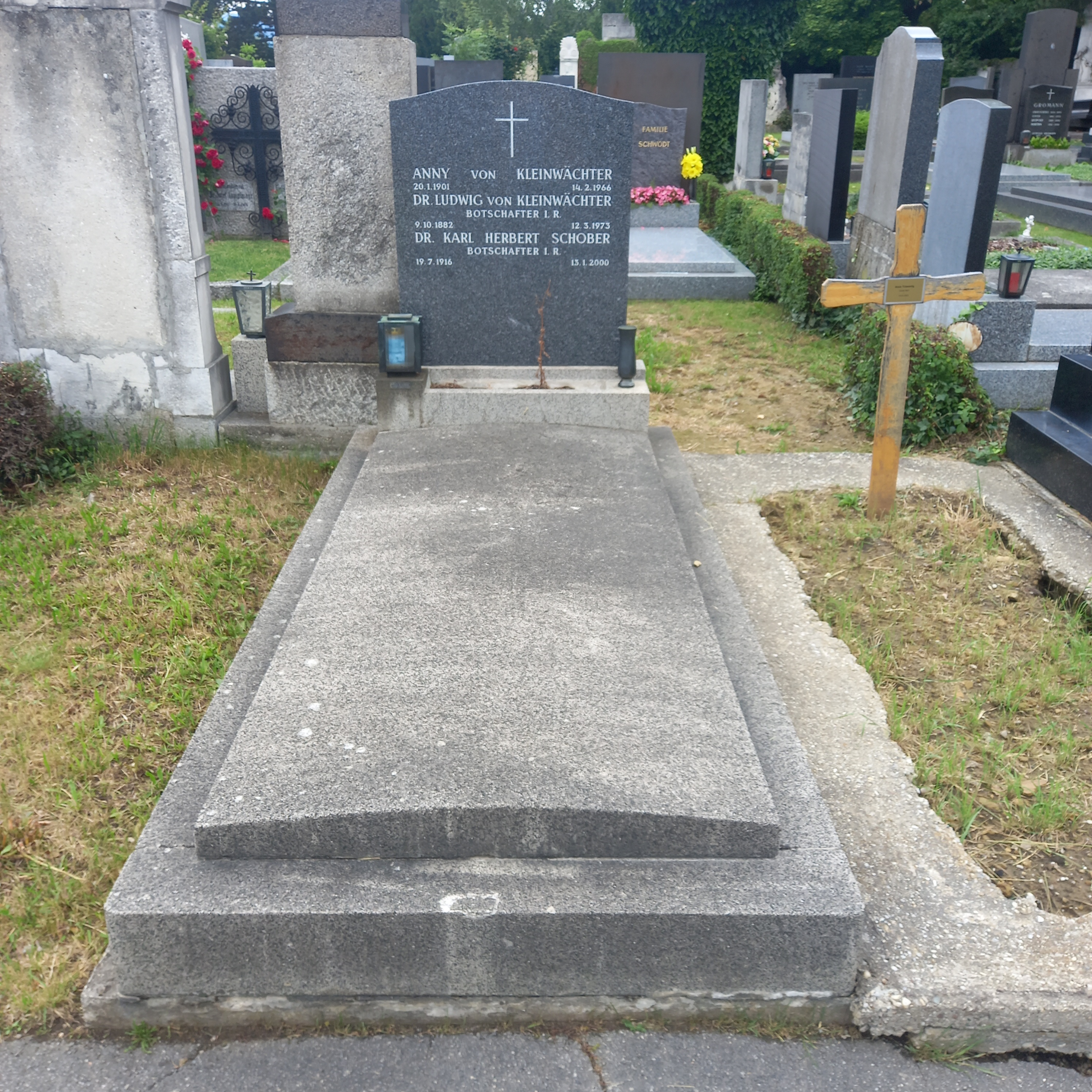
Kleinwächter's grave at Döbling Cemetery in Vienna

In 1921 he married and had two daughters. Kleinwächter died in Vienna on 12 March 1973.

== Honours ==
- 1935: Grand Officer's Cross of the Order of the Crown of Italy
- 1936: Officer's Cross of the Austrian Order of Merit

Diplomatic posts
Preceded by Edgar L. G. Prochnik (as Minister of the First Austrian Republic)	Austrian Ambassador to the United States; 1946–1952	Succeeded by Max Löwenthal
