= 2004 Austrian presidential election =

- 25 April 2004
- Turnout: 71.60%
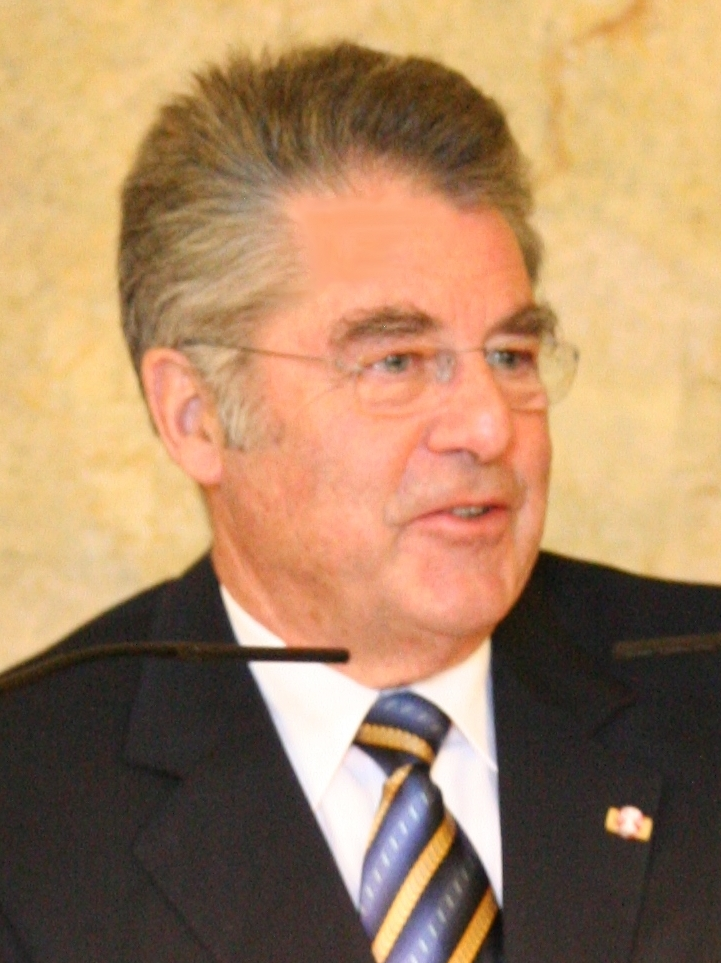

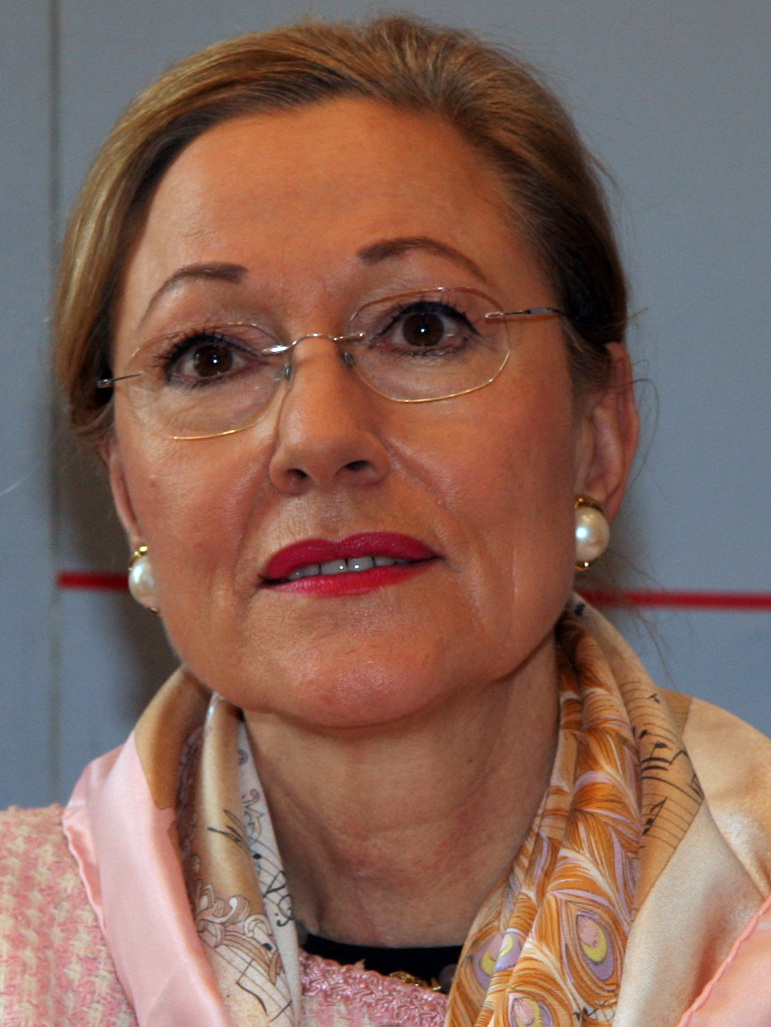
Nominee	Heinz Fischer	Benita Ferrero-Waldner
Party	SPÖ	ÖVP
Popular vote	2,166,690	1,969,326
Percentage	52.39%	47.61%
President before election
Thomas Klestil
ÖVP
President-Elect
Heinz Fischer
SPÖ

Presidential elections were held in Austria on 25 April 2004. While the post of President of Austria is a largely ceremonial one, presidential elections are conducted on a party basis and are seen as a test of the relative standing of the major parties.

The victorious candidate was Heinz Fischer of the opposition Social Democratic Party of Austria (SPÖ). He defeated Benita Ferrero-Waldner, foreign minister in the ruling conservative coalition led by the Austrian People's Party (ÖVP).

== Campaign ==
The campaign started in January 2004 with the announcements of Ferrero-Waldner and Fischer that they would run. Several other candidates also announced their intention to run, but they were not supported by a major party, their campaigns went virtually unnoticed by the media, and they failed to get the required 6,000 signatures supporting their candidacy.

A notable exception was Franz Fiedler, head of the National Audit Office. In late February he announced that he was considering a candidacy, and that he had the support of important but unnamed politicians. Conventional wisdom held that he had no chance of getting a majority, but that his candidacy would force a run-off between Ferrero-Waldner and Fischer. But since his financial supporters were unwilling to reveal their names, he decided not to run.

In advance of the campaign the ÖVP and the SPÖ agreed on a "Fairness Pact," with compliance to be supervised by a panel of three people, headed by Ludwig Adamovich, former head of the Constitutional Court.

The first complaint before the panel was brought by the SPÖ, who claimed that the ÖVP had stolen one of their slogans. The panel decided that this was not fair according to community standards, but not specifically forbidden by the Fairness Pact. Both parties hailed this decision as a victory for their own side.

Later, both sides complained that the other side had given out presents of tangible value (mainly chocolates) at rallies; the panel refused to consider these claims. Other complaints (commercials during the agreed-upon Easter break, tearing down and defacing posters) were withdrawn.

== Platforms ==
Fischer's campaign praised their candidate's experience as President of the Parliament, his expertise in constitutional law, and his proven ability to negotiate compromises. Ferrero's campaign suggested that as a dedicated socialist Fischer might not always show the neutrality required from a Federal President.

Ferrero's campaign pointed to her international connections, her language abilities (English, French, Italian, Spanish), and her performance as foreign minister during the period of the European Union sanctions against Austria. Fischer's campaign claimed that she had made many mistakes as a foreign minister, and expressed the fear that a conservative president would not be an appropriate counterweight to a conservative government.

In the beginning of the campaign, polls suggested a 15% lead for Fischer: during the campaign Ferrero narrowed the margin, but polls never showed a decisive lead for her.

== Results ==
In the 2002 parliamentary elections the conservative parties (the ÖVP and the Freedom Party of Austria, FPÖ) received 52 percent of the votes, compared to 46 percent for the SPÖ and the Greens. In this election, however, many conservative voters stayed at home, and this (together with Fischer's high personal popularity) was the reason for the lower number of votes for Ferrero. The turnout of slightly above 70% of registered voters was considered low by Austrian standards.

Candidate	Party	Votes	%
Heinz Fischer	Social Democratic Party of Austria	2,166,690	52.39
Benita Ferrero-Waldner	Austrian People's Party	1,969,326	47.61
Total		4,136,016	100.00
Valid votes		4,136,016	95.78
Invalid/blank votes		182,423	4.22
Total votes		4,318,439	100.00
Registered voters/turnout		6,030,982	71.60
Source: Ministry of Interior

=== By state ===
State	Fischer	Ferrero-Waldner	Electorate	Votes	Valid votes	Invalid votes
Burgenland	101,605	83,731	219,495	192,524	185,336	7,188
Lower Austria	468,504	459,143	1,182,362	972,769	927,647	45,122
Vienna	453,420	238,586	1,121,111	712,968	692,006	20,962
Carinthia	130,122	145,659	431,803	287,103	275,781	11,322
Steiermark	312,328	297,978	935,735	637,115	610,306	26,809
Upper Austria	372,759	337,394	1,030,703	742,714	710,153	32,561
Salzburg	106,108	129,375	370,684	244,779	235,483	9,296
Tirol	140,874	185,822	493,957	344,592	326,696	17,896
Vorarlberg	56,705	66,445	245,132	133,688	123,150	10,538
Source: European Election Database
