= Max Löwenthal-Chlumecky =

Austrian diplomat

Joseph Maria Maximilian Freiherr von Löwenthal-Chlumecky; from 1919 Max Löwenthal-Chlumecky (14 March 1908 – 27 August 1995) was an Austrian diplomat.

== Early life ==
Löwenthal was born on 14 March 1908 in Mali Lošinj, a town on the island of Lošinj, in what was then part of Austria-Hungary and today is part of Croatia. His family moved to Vienna in 1912. He was the son of Joseph Freiherr von Löwenthal-Chlumecký (1873–1940), office manager of the Council of Ministers of Austria-Hungary and Alice, Edle Tuerk von Karlovacgrad (1880–1950).

He attended the Schottengymnasium, an independent Catholic gymnasium in the First District of Vienna. The school had been founded in 1807 and was one of the most prestigious schools in Austria. After, he studied law and received his juris doctor.

== Career ==
Löwenthal-Chlumecky worked as a bank clerk before joining the Austrian Foreign Service in March 1932. He was stationed in Prague until February 1935 and then in Paris. Beginning in 1936, he was in the foreign office in Vienna, where in 1938 he ran the office of Foreign Minister Guido Schmidt. Upon the "Annexation of Austria," the "Law for the Restoration of the Professional Civil Service" was applied and Löwenthal-Chlumecky was imprisoned because of his Jewish background. After the annexation, Löwenthal was employed by Continentale Motorschiffahrts-AG (COMOS), which operated in the operating association of the Danube shipping associations.

=== Post World War II ===
On 5 February 1952, he was appointed Austrian ambassador to Washington, D.C., where he succeeded Dr. Ludwig Kleinwächter, was accredited from 13 February 1952 to 1954. While based in Washington, D.C., he was also accredited to the governments in Ottawa, Havana and Santo Domingo from 1952 to 1954. From 1954 to 1955 he was based in Buenos Aires, and accredited to the governments in Montevideo and Asunción.

From 16 March 1955 to 1972, he was the Austrian ambassador to Rome. When the South Tyrolean Liberation Committee became active with isolated explosive attacks, Löwenthal was called to Vienna for consultations in February 1960. In 1966, he resided in Rome and was accredited to the government in Tunis as Ambassador Extraordinary and Plenipotentiary. He served in Rome until his retirement in 1972.

== Personal life ==
In 1941, Löwenthal married Baroness Else von Rienzburg (née von dem Bussche-Haddenhausen) (1914–1969), the former wife of Wilfried, Edler von Rienzburg, and daughter of Baron Hilmar von dem Bussche-Haddenhausen, a prominent German diplomat, and his Argentinian wife, María Eleonore Martínez de Hoz. Her elder sister, Baroness Marie von dem Bussche-Haddenhausen, was the wife of Walther Mumm von Schwarzenstein, and Ulrich, 10th Prince Kinsky of Wchinitz and Tettau.

Löwenthal-Chlumecky died in Bolzano on 27 August 1995 was buried in the Protestant Cemetery, Rome.

Diplomatic posts
Preceded by Ludwig Kleinwächter	Ambassador of Austria in Washington, D.C. 1952–1954	Succeeded by Karl Gruber
Preceded by	Ambassador of Austria in Ottawa; 1952–1954	Succeeded by Walther Peinsipp
Preceded by Stephan Tauschitz	Ambassador of Austria in Buenos Aires; 1954–1955	Succeeded by Meinard Falser
Preceded by Johannes Schwarzenberg	Ambassador of Austria in Rome; 1955–1972	Succeeded by Heribert Tschofen
