= Erich Bielka =

Austrian diplomat

- Born: 15 May 1908; Vienna, Austria-Hungary
- Died: 1 September 1992 (aged 84); Bad Aussee, Styria
- Occupations: Diplomat, member of Austrian government

Erich Bielka or Erich Bielka-Karltreu (born Ritter Bielka von Karltreu, 15 May 1908, Vienna, Austria – 1 September 1992, Bad Aussee, Styria) was an Austrian diplomat and member of the Austrian government. During his career, he served as Austrian ambassador in Bern, Cairo, Ankara and Paris and as Foreign Minister from 1974 to 1976.

== Honours and awards ==
- Grand Gold Decoration for Services to the Republic of Austria (1965)
- Great Silver Medal for Services to the Republic of Austria (1974)
- Grand Officer of the Legion of Honour
- Decoration for Services to the Liberation of Austria
