= Benita Ferrero-Waldner =

Austrian diplomat and politician

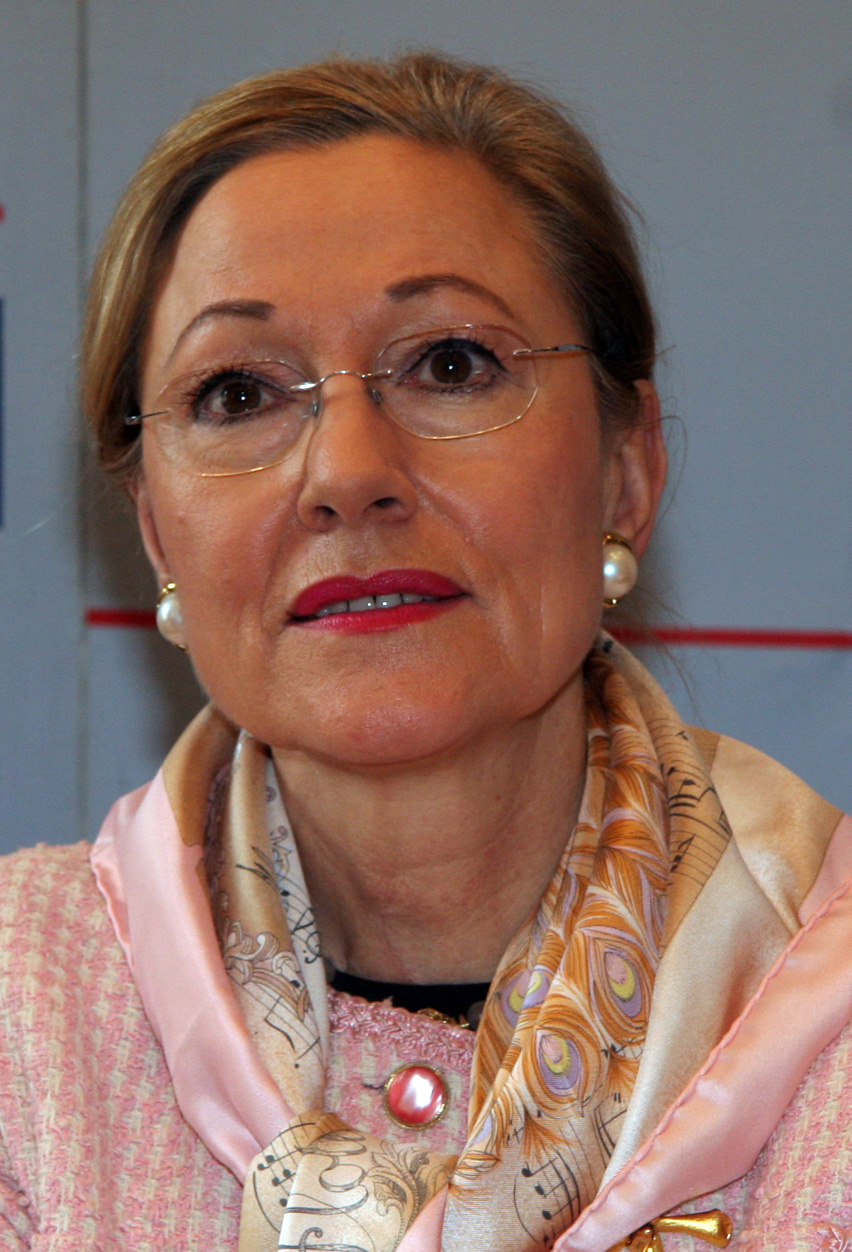
- Ferrero-Waldner in 2006

European Commissioner for the European Neighbourhood Policy
- In office 22 November 2004 – 9 February 2010
- President: José Manuel Barroso
- Preceded by: Position established
- Succeeded by: Štefan Füle

European Commissioner for Trade
- In office 1 December 2009 – 9 February 2010
- President: José Manuel Barroso
- Preceded by: Catherine Ashton
- Succeeded by: Karel De Gucht

European Commissioner for External Relations
- In office 22 November 2004 – 1 December 2009
- President: José Manuel Barroso
- Preceded by: Chris Patten
- Succeeded by: Catherine Ashton (High Representative for Foreign Affairs and Security Policy)

Minister of Foreign Affairs
- In office 4 February 2000 – 20 October 2004
- Chancellor: Wolfgang Schüssel
- Preceded by: Wolfgang Schüssel
- Succeeded by: Ursula Plassnik

Personal details
- Born: 5 September 1948 (age 77) Salzburg, Austria
- Party: People's Party
- Spouse(s): Wolfgang Sterr (1974–1983); Francisco Ferrero Campos (1993–present)
- Education: University of Salzburg

Benita Ferrero-Waldner (born 5 September 1948) is an Austrian diplomat and politician, and a member of the conservative Austrian People's Party (ÖVP). Ferrero-Waldner served as Foreign Minister of Austria 2000–2004 and was the candidate of the Austrian People's Party in the 2004 Austrian presidential election, which she narrowly lost with 47.6% of the votes. She served as the European Commissioner for External Relations and European Neighbourhood Policy from 2004 to 2009, and as the European Commissioner for Trade and European Neighbourhood Policy from 2009 to 2010.

== Early life and education ==
Born in Salzburg, Waldner took her matura exams in 1966 and then studied law, receiving a doctorate from the University of Salzburg in 1970.

== Career ==
Until 1983, Waldner worked in the private sector. Only in 1984 did she enter the diplomatic service. One of her most influential positions was Chef de protocole for Secretary General Boutros-Ghali at the UN in New York City.

From 1995 until 2000, Ferrero-Waldner served as Under-Secretary of State in two governments led by Social Democrats Franz Vranitzky and Viktor Klima. When Wolfgang Schüssel became Chancellor of Austria early in 2000, he made Ferrero-Waldner his Minister for Foreign Affairs, a position she held until October 2004, when she was succeeded by Ursula Plassnik.

In January 2004, it was announced that Ferrero-Waldner would run for president of Austria to succeed Thomas Klestil in July 2004. Her candidature was supported by the Austrian People's Party; her only opponent was Heinz Fischer. However, she lost the election on 25 April.

=== Member of the European Commission, 2004–2010 ===
In late July 2004, Ferrero-Waldner was nominated as the successor of Franz Fischler as Austria's European Commissioner. She took office on 22 November. Her portfolio was Foreign Affairs and European Neighbourhood Policy.

As the EU's External Affairs Commissioner, Ferrero-Waldner is credited with being the key diplomat in the 24 July 2007 release of five Bulgarian nurses and a Palestinian doctor imprisoned by Libya. They had been held for more than 8 years on charges of purposefully infecting children with HIV, and have continued to profess their innocence. The commissioner made many trips to Libya and met with the prisoners regularly. She also worked to improve conditions for children infected with HIV/Aids.

== Life after politics ==
In September 2009, Ferrero-Waldner ran for the post of UNESCO Director-General but lost to the Bulgarian candidate Irina Bokova. Since leaving politics, she has held a variety of paid and unpaid positions, including the following:

- Munich Re, member of the supervisory board (2010–2021)
- United Nations Voluntary Trust Fund for Victims of Trafficking in Persons, President of the Board of Trustees (2017–2020)
- European Institute of the Mediterranean (IEMed), Member of the Advisory Council
- Graduate School for Global and International Studies, University of Salamanca, Member of the Advisory Board
- Member of the Nizami Ganjavi International Center

In February 2020, Ferrero-Waldner joined around fifty former European prime ministers and foreign ministers in signing an open letter published by British newspaper The Guardian to condemn U.S. president Donald Trump's Middle East peace plan, saying it would create an apartheid-like situation in occupied Palestinian territory.

== Personal life ==
From 1974 until 1983, Waldner was married to Wolfgang Sterr, a Bavarian high school teacher. However, their marriage ended in divorce. In 1993, Waldner married Francisco Ferrero Campos, a lecturer in Spanish and Latin American literature at the University of Vienna.

After her previous marriage had finally been annulled, Ferrero-Waldner married her husband again in church in December 2003. The couple does not have any children.

Political offices
Preceded by Wolfgang Schüssel	Minister of Foreign Affairs; 2000–2004	Succeeded by Ursula Plassnik
Preceded by Franz Fischler	Austrian European Commissioner; 2004–2010	Succeeded by Johannes Hahn
Preceded by Chris Patten	European Commissioner for External Relations and European Neighbourhood Policy; 2004–2009	Succeeded by Catherine Ashton as High Representative for Foreign Affairs and Security Policy
Preceded by Chris Patten	European Commissioner for External Relations and European Neighbourhood Policy; 2004–2009	Succeeded by Herself as European Commissioner for Trade and European Neighbourhood Policy
Preceded by Catherine Ashton as European Commissioner for Trade	European Commissioner for Trade and European Neighbourhood Policy; 2009–2010	Succeeded by Karel De Gucht as European Commissioner for Trade
Preceded by Herself as European Commissioner for External Relations and European Neighbourhood Policy	European Commissioner for Trade and European Neighbourhood Policy; 2009–2010	Succeeded by Štefan Füle as European Commissioner for Enlargement and European Neighbourhood Policy
