= Karl Gruber =

Austrian politician and diplomat (1909-1995)

Karl Gruber (3 May 1909 – 1 February 1995) was an Austrian politician and diplomat. During World War II, he was working for a German firm in Berlin. After the war, in 1945, he became Landeshauptmann of Tyrol for a short time. He then was Foreign Minister of Austria until 1953.

Born on May 3, 1909 in Innsbruck, Karl Gruber served as Austrian ambassador to the United States from 1954 to 1957 and from 1969 to 1972, as ambassador to Spain from 1961 to 1966, as ambassador to the Federal Republic of Germany in 1966, and as ambassador to Switzerland from 1972 to 1974.

Gruber was awarded the Grand Decoration of Honour in Gold with Sash in 1954. He died in February 1995 in Innsbruck.

== See also ==
- Gruber-De Gasperi Agreement

Political offices
Preceded by Franz Hofer as Gauleiter of Tyrol and Vorarlberg	Governor of Tyrol; 1945	Succeeded by Alfons Weißgatterer
Vacant Annexation of Austria by Nazi Germany Title last held by Wilhelm Wolf	Foreign Minister of Austria; 1945 – 1953	Succeeded by Leopold Figl
Diplomatic posts
Preceded by Max Loewenthal	Austrian Ambassador to the United States; 1954 – 1957	Succeeded by Wilfried Platzer
Preceded by Ernst Lemberger	Austrian Ambassador to the United States; 1969 – 1972	Succeeded by Arno Halusa
