= Ursula Plassnik =

Austrian diplomat and politician

Her Excellency Ursula Plassnik
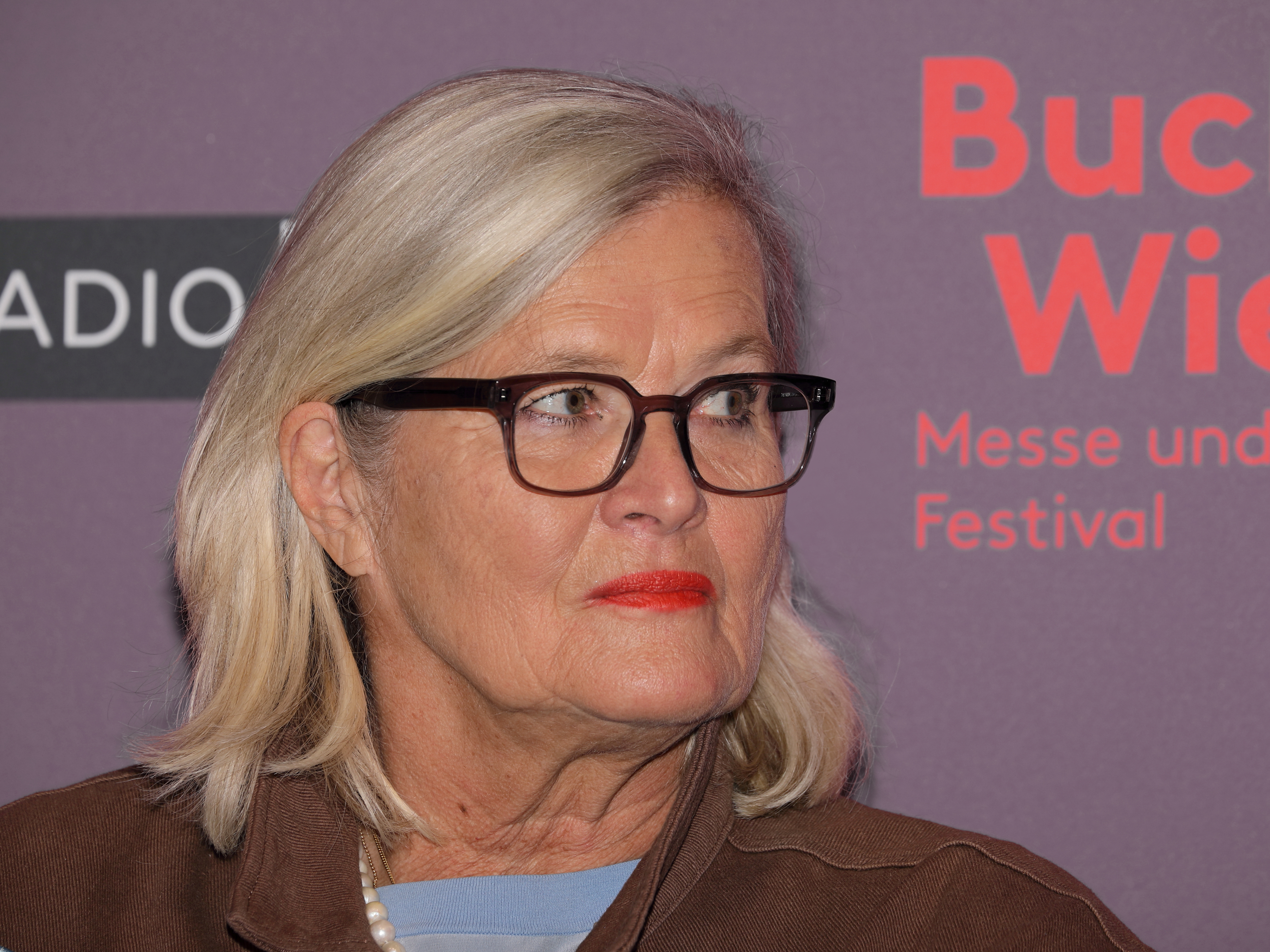

Minister of Foreign Affairs
- In office 20 October 2004 – 2 December 2008
- Chancellor: Wolfgang Schüssel; Alfred Gusenbauer
- Preceded by: Benita Ferrero-Waldner
- Succeeded by: Michael Spindelegger

Personal details
- Born: 23 May 1956 (age 70) Klagenfurt, Austria
- Party: People's Party
- Education: University of Vienna; College of Europe

Ursula Plassnik (German pronunciation: [ˈʊʁzula ˈplasnɪk]; born 23 May 1956) is an Austrian diplomat and politician. She was Foreign Minister of Austria between October 2004 and December 2008. She has served as the Austrian ambassador to Switzerland from 2016 to 2021.

== Early life and career ==
Plassnik is from the Austrian state of Carinthia and grew up in a social democratic family. She was born in Klagenfurt on 23 May 1956. From 1971 to 1972 she was an exchange student at the Foxcroft School in Middleburg, Virginia, United States. She received a law degree from the University of Vienna in 1978 and a postgraduate Certificate of Advanced European Studies (equivalent to a master's degree) from the College of Europe in Bruges, where she studied 1979–1980 (Salvador de Madariaga promotion). Subsequently, she worked in different positions in the Austrian Ministry for Foreign Affairs until 1997. Until that time she was considered to be politically neutral or even social-democratic.

On 1 July 1997 she was chosen by Wolfgang Schüssel, who was Austrian vice-chancellor at that time, to become his cabinet chief. In 2000 she refused an offer to work for the Council of Europe, in order to stay in Austria and help Wolfgang Schüssel when he became Austrian Chancellor in a coalition government with the Austrian Freedom Party. She is considered to be a close friend and confidante to Schüssel.

She remained cabinet chief in Schüssel's government until 15 January 2004, when she became Austria's ambassador to Switzerland. Recently, Ursula Plassnik's application for the position as secretary-general of the Organization for Security and Cooperation in Europe (OSCE) has been vetoed by Turkey, because of her opposition to that country's bid to join the European Union. Her successor in July 2021 as ambassador is Austria career diplomat Maria Rotheiser-Scotti.

== Foreign Minister of Austria, 2004–2008 ==
Plassnik was appointed Foreign Minister on 18 October 2004, and sworn in on 20 October succeeding Benita Ferrero-Waldner, who resigned to become a European commissioner. She joined the Austrian People's Party after receiving the offer to become foreign minister. On 2 December 2008 she was succeeded by Michael Spindelegger.

Plassnik voiced concern over the 2006 Lebanon War. She called for an immediate end to hostilities in Lebanon.

== Other activities ==
- European Council on Foreign Relations (ECFR), Member of the Council
- Foreign Policy and United Nations Association of Austria (UNA-AUSTRIA), Member of the Board
- Paris School of International Affairs (PSIA), Member of the Strategic Committee
- Trilateral Commission, Member of the Executive Committee

== Personal life ==
Plassnik has been married twice. Her first marriage was to Dr. Georg Posch, who became secretary general of the Austrian Parliament. Her second marriage was to Swiss diplomat Gérard Stoudmann. She stands out in public due to her height, at 191 cm (6 ft 3 in) tall.

At Plassnik's initiative, the conductor and pianist Daniel Barenboim gave his long-awaited first performance in Egypt at the Cairo Opera House and conducted the Cairo Symphony Orchestra in Beethoven's Symphony No. 5 in April 2009. Barenboim had planned to make his Egyptian debut in January 2009 as part of a world tour with the West-Eastern Divan Orchestra, the Arab-Israeli group he founded with the writer Edward Said. But that concert was canceled out of concern for the performers' safety because of fighting in Gaza.

== Honours ==
- Grand Cordon of the Order of the Rising Sun (2026)

Political offices
Preceded by Benita Ferrero-Waldner	Minister of Foreign Affairs; 2004–2008	Succeeded by Michael Spindelegger
Diplomatic posts
Preceded by Jack Straw	President of the Council of the European Union; 2006	Succeeded by Erkki Tuomioja
