= The Knifegrinder (Goya) =

Painting by Francisco de Goya

- El afilador (Spanish)
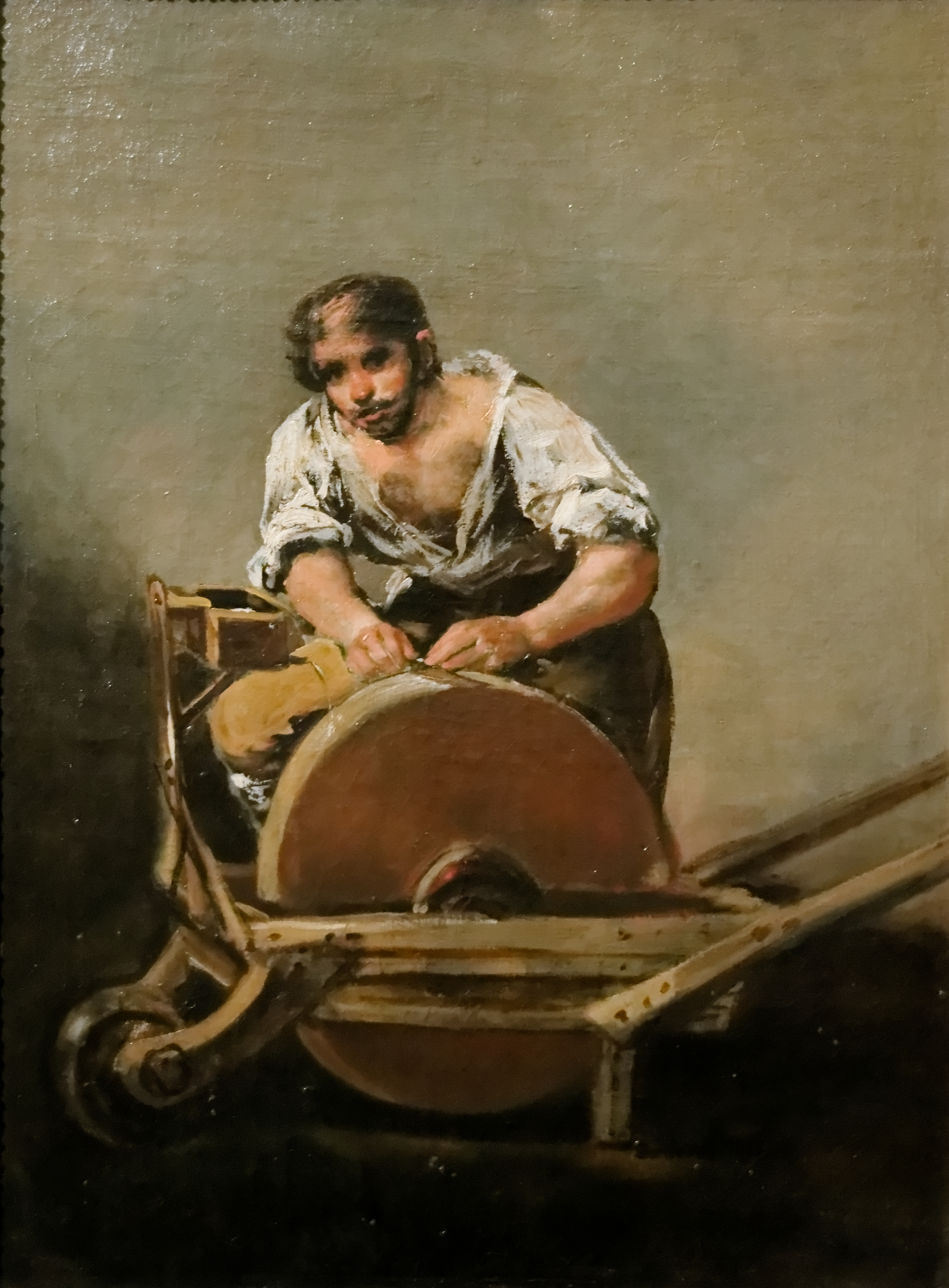
- Artist: Francisco de Goya
- Year: c. 1808–1812
- Medium: oil on canvas
- Dimensions: 68 cm × 50.5 cm (27 in × 19.9 in)
- Location: Museum of Fine Arts, Budapest

The Knifegrinder (Spanish: El afilador) is an oil painting on canvas by the Spanish artist Francisco de Goya, from c. 1808–1812. It is now in the Museum of Fine Arts in Budapest.

== History ==
The art historian Juliet Wilson–Bareau suggests that this work and The Water Bearer were painted for the painter's house in Madrid. The painting was still in the possession of the artist in 1812. On the death of his wife Josefa Bayeu, he made an inventory of his paintings at Fuendetodos. The Knifegrinder was valued at 300 reales and catalogued under number 13, the same number as The Water Bearer and The Servant with a Pitcher.

According to the art historian Manuela Mena, the painting was sold directly to prince Alois Wenzel Kaunitz (ambassador to Spain from the Austrian Empire) by the painter after the Peninsular War. Shortly afterwards it was sold to Nicolas Esterházy. The Esterházy collection was acquired by the Hungarian state in 1870, forming the nucleus of the Museum of Fine Arts.

== Analysis ==
During the Spanish War of Independence, Goya paid particular attention to popular figures, whether engaged in their profession or not. Two of his works (The Water Carrier and The Knife Grinder) can also be understood in the context of the Spanish War of Independence. In the first, the water carrier can be seen as carrying water and wine for the fighters. The figure depicted in The Knife Grinder can be considered a symbol of the resistance, responsible for preparing the knives used by the guerrillas against the troops of Napoleon I. Goya's perspective is similar to that of his religious depictions, with an idealization of the figures, a monumental aspect, and lighting effects that highlight them.

In this work, Goya is a precursor of a certain realism which was developed a little later in France with a painting that took the working masses as its theme. The figure is depicted in his labor, with a knife on the wheel, held with both hands, the body slightly inclined forward and the right leg resting on the wooden post. The background is a neutral, completely smooth color, against which stands out the figure's open white shirt, rolled up to reveal his chest and bare arms to the elbows. The rest of the composition is ochre with light touches of red on the sharpening wheel to suggest rotation. The knife grinder seems to be looking at the viewer as if he had been caught in the act of working.

== See also ==
- List of works by Francisco Goya
