= Peter Huber (diplomat) =

Austrian diplomat

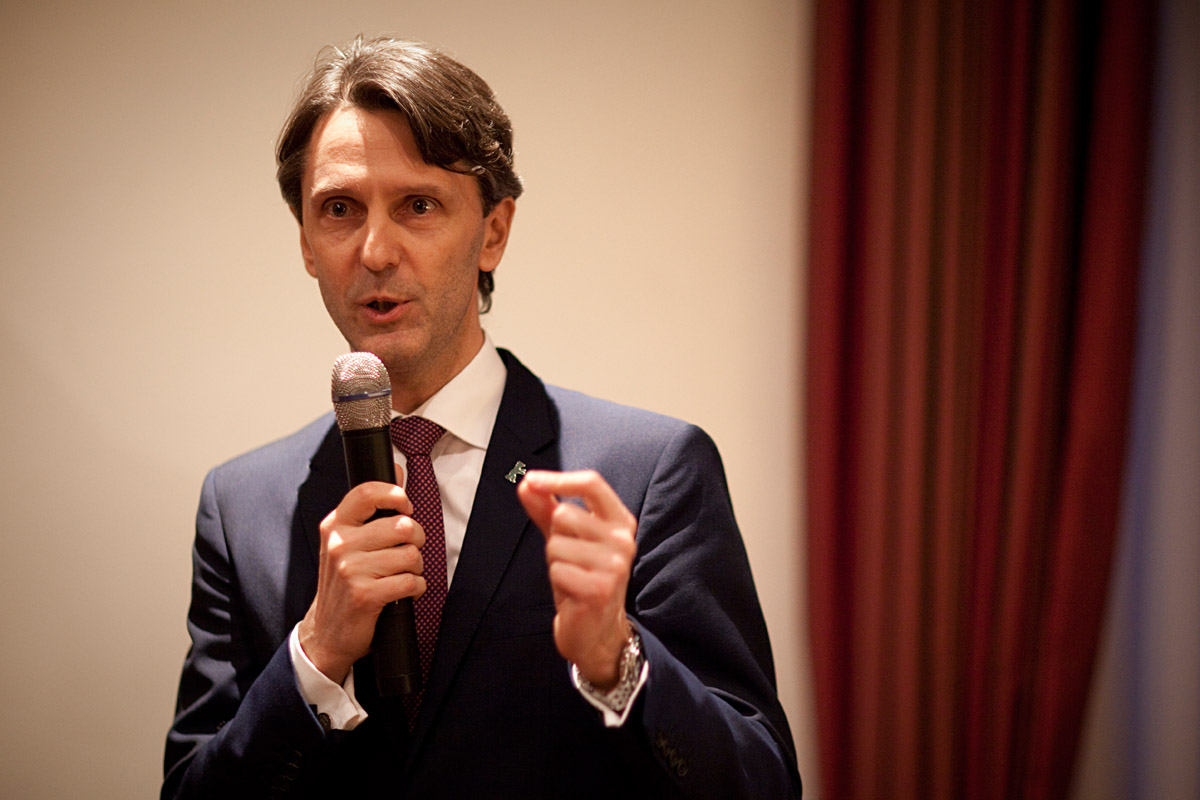
- Peter Huber in 2018

Austrian Ambassador to Germany
- In office December 2017 – 2022
- Preceded by: Nikolaus Marschik
- Succeeded by: Michael Linhart

Austrian Ambassador to Spain
- In office January 2014 – November 2017
- Preceded by: Rudolf Lennkh
- Succeeded by: Christian Ebner

Personal details
- Born: 16 October 1967 (age 58) Kitzbühel, Tyrol, Austria
- Education: University of Innsbruck; Georgetown University

Peter Huber (born 16 October 1967) is an Austrian diplomat who has been serving as the Ambassador of Austria to Germany since December 2017.

== Early life ==
Born on 16 October 1967 in Kitzbühel, Tyrol, Austria, Peter Huber attended a federal high school in St. Johann in Tirol. From 1987 to 1992, he read law at the University of Innsbruck. After that, he spent 2 years at the Diplomatic Academy of Vienna as a participant of the 29th diploma course. From 1994 to 1995, he was pursuing his Master of Laws for a year at Georgetown University in Washington, D.C., United States. In 1995, he received his doctorate in law from the University of Innsbruck.

== Diplomatic career ==
- January 1996: Joined the diplomatic service and was assigned to the legal and consular section of the Citizens Service
- September 1996: Transferred to the International Organizations Department
- March 1997: Dispatched to the Austrian permanent representation to the United Nations
- October 1997: Moved back to the International Organizations Department
- August 1999: Sent to the Austrian permanent representation to the UN and promoted to Counsellor
- September 2002: Became Counselor in the Austrian Embassy in Paris
- March 2005: Returned to the International Organizations department
- November 2005: Appointed as deputy head of the International Organizations department
- August 2008: Head of the International Organizations department
- April 2011: Head of office of the State Secretary in the Foreign Ministry Wolfgang Waldner
- September 2012: Head of office of the State Secretary in the Foreign Ministry Reinhold Lopatka
- January 2014: Austrian Ambassador in Madrid and dually accredited in Andorra
- December 2017: Austrian Ambassador in Berlin

Diplomatic posts
Preceded by Rudolf Lennkh	Austrian Ambassador to Spain; 2014–2017	Succeeded by Christian Ebner
Preceded by Nikolaus Marschik	Austrian Ambassador to Germany; 2017–present	Succeeded by Michael Linhart
