= Edgar L. G. Prochnik =

Austrian diplomat and writer

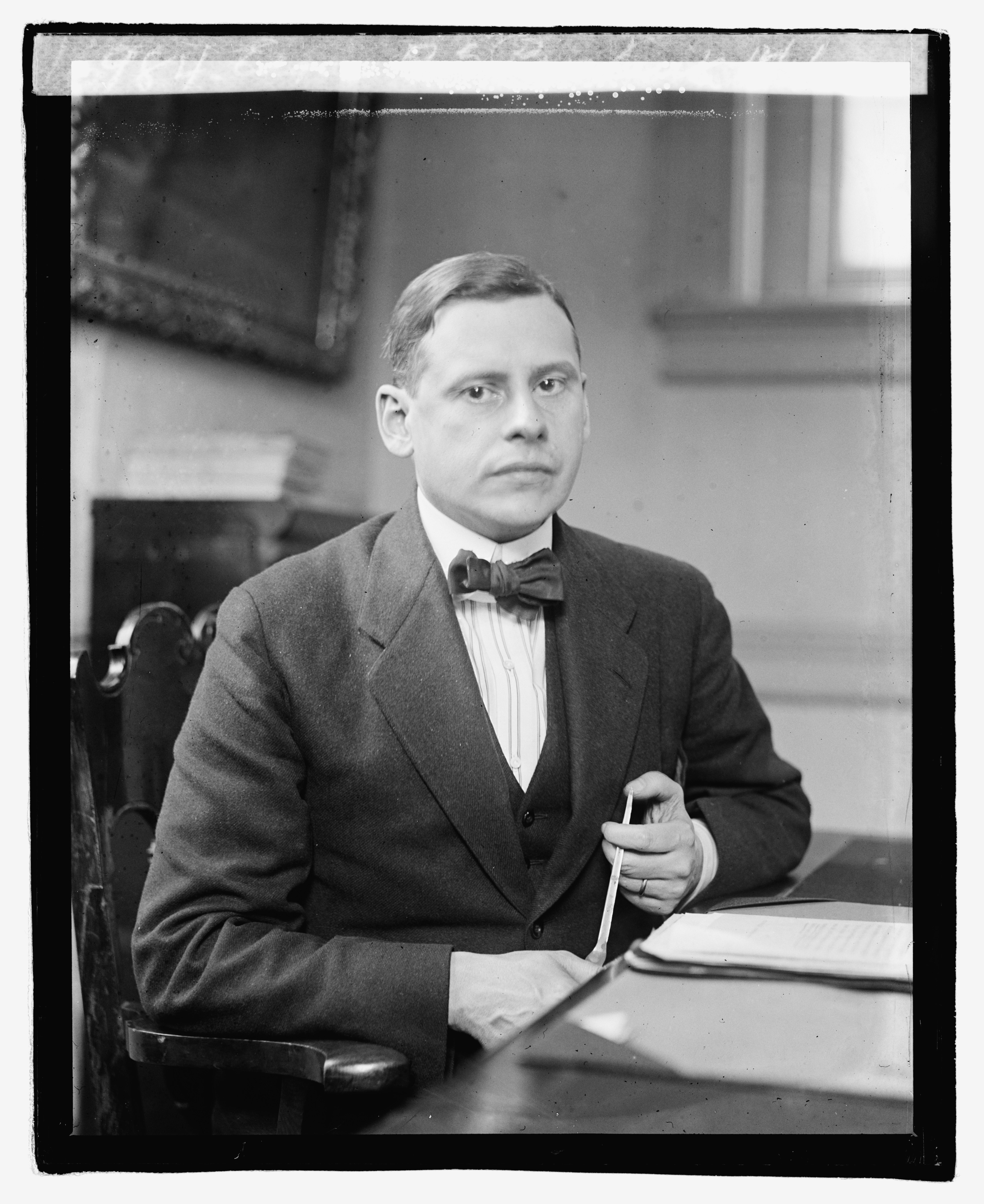
- Photograph of Prochnik, 1921

Envoy Extraordinary and Minister Plenipotentiary of Austria to the United States
- In office 2 December 1921 – 13 March 1938
- Preceded by: Erich Zwiedinek von Südenhorst (as Chargé d'affaires of the Austro-Hungarian Empire)
- Succeeded by: Ludwig Kleinwächter

Personal details
- Born: Edgar Leo Gustav Prochnik; 21 January 1879 Amborina, Dutch East Indies
- Died: 12 April 1964 (aged 85) Washington, D.C.
- Spouse(s): Mary Seibert Batchelder (died 1912) Gretchen Stirling James (m. 1915; Edgar died 1964)
- Relations: Stephanie Zimbalist (granddaughter)
- Children: 4
- Parent(s): Therese Keller; Leo Johann Prochnik

Edgar Leo Gustav Prochnik (21 January 1879 – 12 April 1964) was an Austrian diplomat and writer.

== Early life ==
Prochnik was born on 21 January 1879 in Amborina, Dutch East Indies. He was the son of Therese Keller and Leo Johann Prochnik.

He graduated from the Consular School in Vienna in 1904.

== Career ==
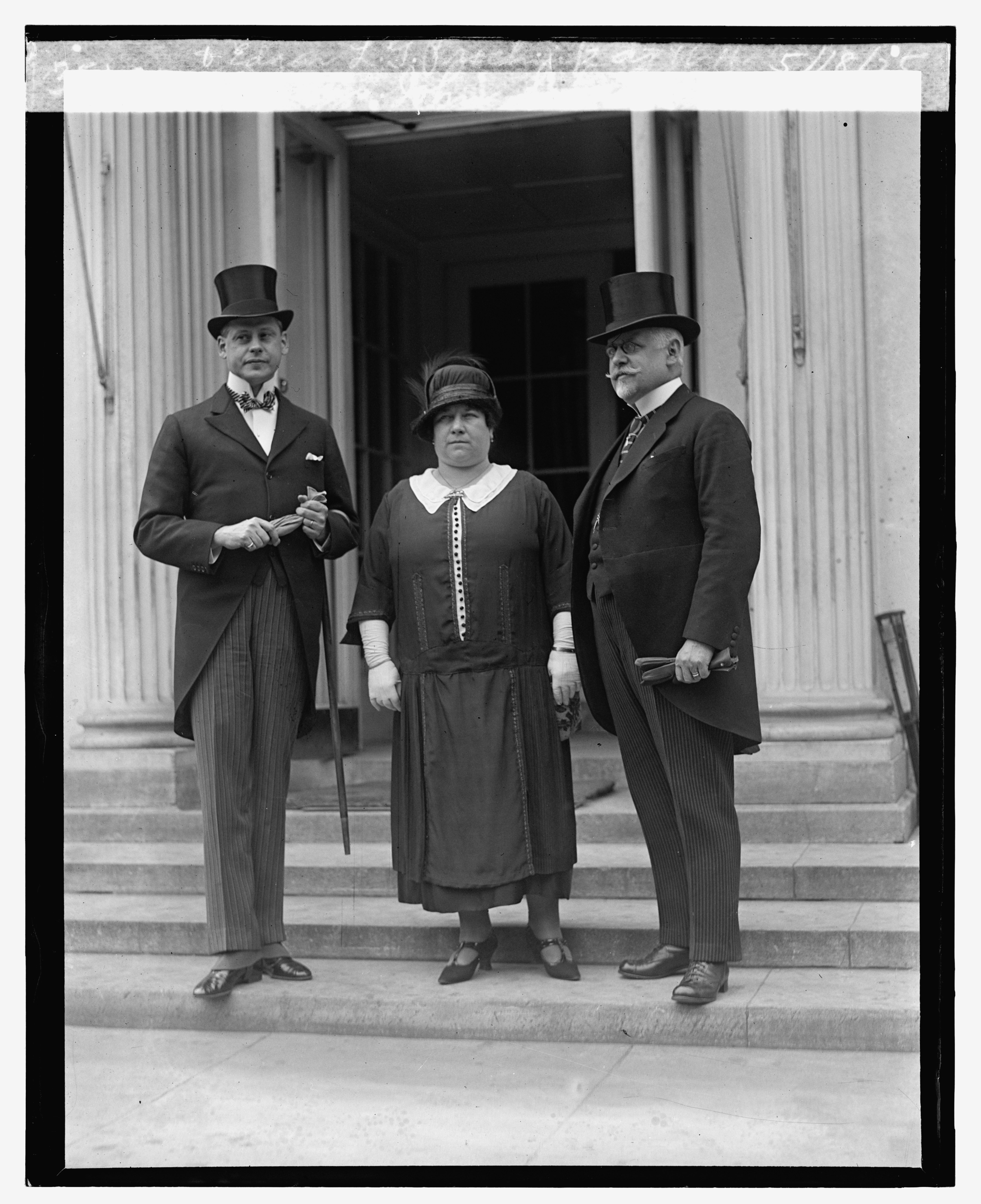
Prochnik (left) with former Chancellor of Austria Johann Schober and his wife, at the White House, 1925

From 1905 to 1912, Prochnik was the Austrian consular attaché and consul in Pittsburgh, Cleveland, and Chicago. On 2 January 1912, Emperor Franz Joseph I of Austria approved the establishment of an Imperial and Royal Consulate in St. Paul, Minnesota and appointed Prochnik as consul. He held this position until June 1920 when he was appointed Austrian Consul General in Washington, D.C. He was promoted to Chargés d'affaires ad interim on 2 December 1921. On 7 May 1925, he was accredited as Envoy Extraordinary and Minister Plenipotentiary and presented his credentials to President Calvin Coolidge the next day, 8 May 1925. He served as Envoy and Minister until 13 March 1938 when the legation was closed and his mission was terminated due to the Anschluss with Germany.

=== Later life ===
Prochnik, who was opposed to the Nazi regime, was left "a man without a country". He remained in the United States where he lectured on diplomatic history in the School of Foreign Service at Georgetown University until 1960.

After Prochnik left the diplomatic service, his wife went into the trousseau and lingerie business.

== Personal life ==
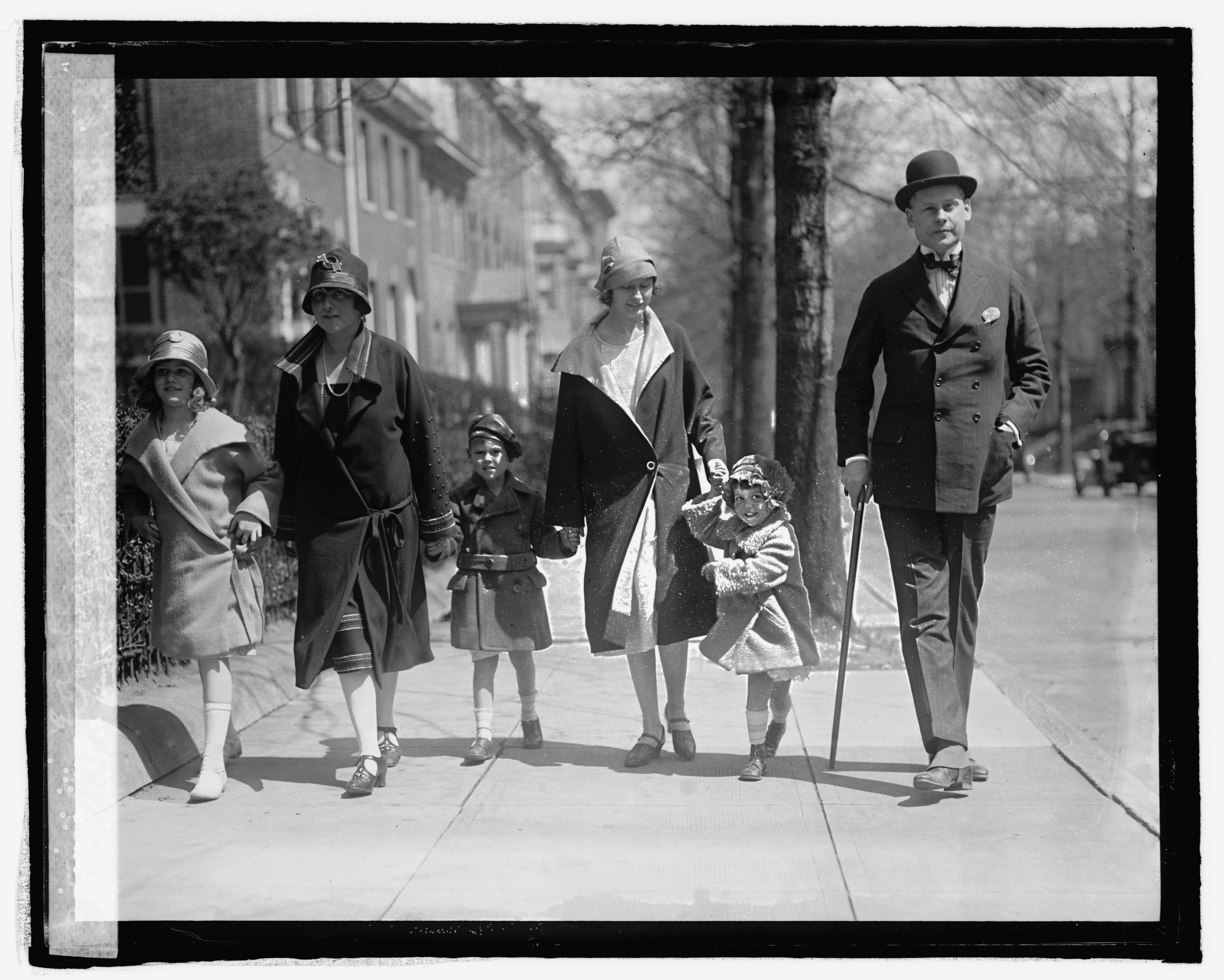
Procknik and his family on Easter Sunday, 1925

Prochnik was twice married, both times to American women. His first wife was Mary Seibert Batchelder (1889–1912), a daughter of David James Batchelder Jr., vice-president of Tremont Lumber Company of Chicago, which had mills in Eros, Louisiana. Before her death in 1912, they were the parents of a daughter:

- Loranda Stephanie Prochnik (1911–1988), who married Francis Lecompte Spalding Sr. in 1931. They divorced and she married Kenneth Kershner Leavitt. In 1956, Loranda Stephanie Spalding, daughter of Francis Lecompte Spalding, married the actor Efrem Zimbalist Jr. They had a daughter, the future actress Stephanie Zimbalist.

In 1915 in Boston, Prochnik married secondly Gretchen Stirling James (1892–1984), a daughter of Edward Preston James and his wife Lillian Stirling Price. After they left the former Austrian embassy, they lived at 1813, 24th Street in Washington D.C. Together, they were the parents of:

- Valerie Stirling Prochnik (1916–2006), who married Jean Raymond Louis de Sibour, a son of Viscount Jules Henri de Sibour, in 1936. They divorced and she married Thomas Rush Ragland Jr. in 1968.
- Edgar Stirling Prochnik (1920–1996), an executive with Union Carbide who married Martha Holman, a daughter of H. Russell Holman, in 1954.
- Patricia Stirling Prochnik (1921–1996), who married economist Samuel Nakasian, who was previously married to Patricia Dohrenwend, in 1951.

Prochnik died at his home in Washington, D.C. on 12 April 1964.

== Published works ==
- La Question d'Orient
- The Diplomatic History of Europe in the Nineteenth Century, Part IV
- The Prime Ministers and Governments of England

Diplomatic posts
Preceded by Erich Zwiedinek von Südenhorst (as Chargé d'affaires of the Austro-Hungarian Empire)	Austrian Envoy and Minister in Washington, D.C. 1921–1938	Succeeded by Ludwig Kleinwächter
