= List of ambassadors of Austria to Germany =

Ambassadors of Austria to Germany

Ambassador of the Republic of Austria to Germany
- Coat of arms of Austria

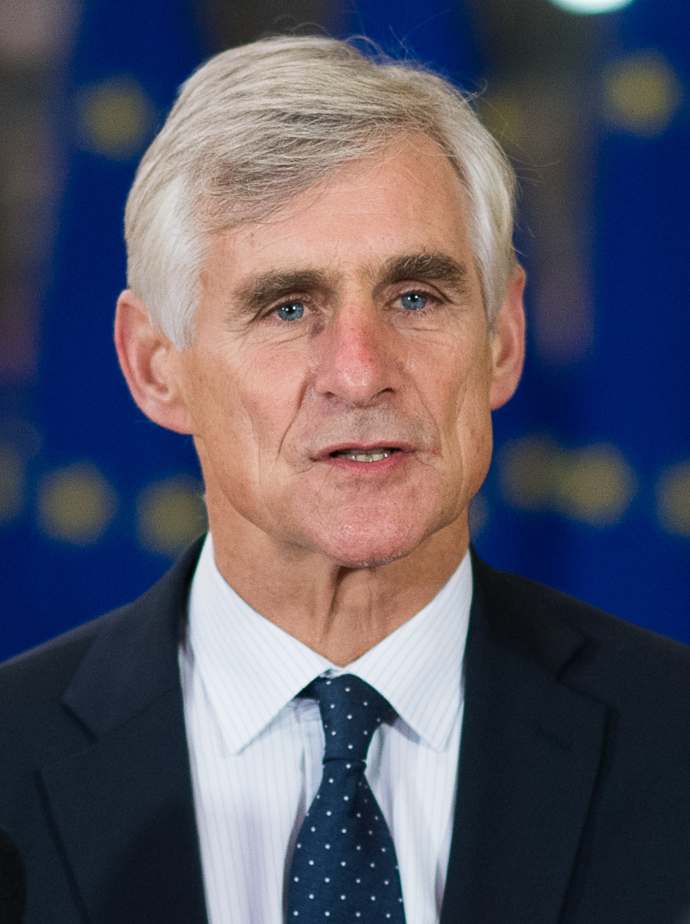
- Incumbent; Michael Linhart since 2022
- Ministry of Foreign Affairs; Embassy of Austria, Berlin
- Style: His Excellency
- Website: Austrian Embassy, Berlin

The Ambassador of the Republic of Austria to Germany is the Republic of Austria's foremost diplomatic representative in Germany. As head of Austria's diplomatic mission there, the ambassador is the official representative of the president and government of Austria to the Cabinet of Germany. The position has the rank and status of an Ambassador Extraordinary and Minister Plenipotentiary and the embassy is located in Berlin.

== History ==
In the last phase of the Holy Roman Empire (until 1806), Austria sent an embassy (1662 to 1806) to the Perpetual Diet of Regensburg. After the Confederation of the Rhine (1806–1813) and the Congress of Vienna (1815), this was followed by an embassy to the German Confederation (1815–1866), in which 35 sovereign princes and four free cities had joined forces.

From 1815 to 1866, Austria sent diplomatic representatives to the Federal Convention (Bundestag) of the German Confederation in Frankfurt am Main, and from 1871 to the Imperial Court of the German Empire in Berlin.

In addition, some of the Habsburg embassies founded in the 16th century in individual German states continued to exist until the 1920s.

== Heads of Mission ==
=== Ambassador to the German Confederation ===
Since the Austrian Empire was a member state of the German Confederation, it was not represented in the sense of a foreign state. Like the other members, Austria sent a representative to the Federal Convention. According to the Federal Act, the Austrian representative presided over the Federal Convention and conducted its affairs. Austria was therefore called the "Bundespräsidium" (roughly chairman of the federation). In practice, this was more of an honorary title.

In parallel to the representative in the Federal Convention, there was also temporarily an Austrian embassy to the Free City of Frankfurt.

Appointed / Accredited	Name	Title/notes	Appointed during	Accredited during	Left post
October 5, 1815	Franz Joseph von Albini			German Confederation	December 16, 1815
December 16, 1815	Johann Rudolf von Buol-Schauenstein			German Confederation	February 24, 1823
February 24, 1823	Joachim Eduard von Münch-Bellinghausen			German Confederation	March 12, 1848
March 12, 1848	Franz von Colloredo-Wallsee			German Confederation	May 14, 1848
May 14, 1848	Anton von Schmerling	Later Interior Minister of the Austrian Empire		German Confederation	July 12, 1848
September 1848	Karl Ludwig von Bruck	Later Finance Minister of the Austrian Empire		Provisional Central Power	October 1, 1848
April 29, 1850	Friedrich von Thun und Hohenstein			German Confederation	November 1, 1852
January 2, 1853	Anton Prokesch von Osten			German Confederation	October 12, 1855
October 12, 1855	Bernhard von Rechberg			German Confederation	May 4, 1859
May 23, 1859	Alois Kübeck von Kübau			German Confederation	August 24, 1866

=== Ambassador to the German Empire ===
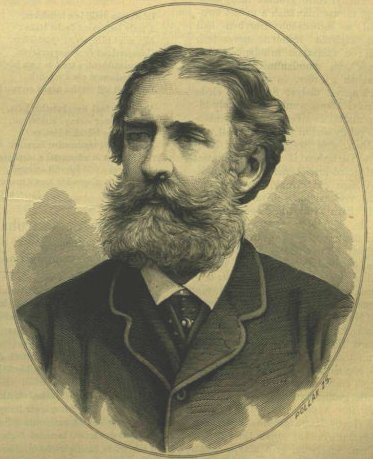
Emmerich Széchényi

Austro-Hungarian ambassador (until 1918) and envoy of the First Republic of Austria (from 1919) to the government of the German Empire (until 1918), the Weimar Republic (from 1919) and National Socialist Germany (from 1933).

Appointed / Accredited	Name	Title/notes	Appointed during	Accredited during	Left post
December 10, 1871	Alajos Károlyi	Ambassador	Franz Joseph I	William I	November 3, 1878
December 27, 1878	Emmerich Széchényi	Ambassador	Franz Joseph I	William I	October 10, 1892
October 24, 1892	Ladislaus von Szögyény-Marich	Ambassador	Franz Joseph I	William I	August 4, 1914
August 4, 1914	Gottfried zu Hohenlohe-Schillingsfürst	Ambassador	Franz Joseph I	William II	November 11, 1918
November 25, 1918	Ludwig Moritz Hartmann	Envoy	Karl Renner	Council of the People's Deputies	November 1, 1920
July 2, 1921	Richard Riedl	Envoy	Michael Mayr	Constantin Fehrenbach	June 30, 1925
June 29, 1925	Felix Frank	Envoy	Rudolf Ramek	Hans Luther	November 30, 1932
November 30, 1932	Josef Meindl	Chargé d'Affaires	Karl Buresch	Papen cabinet	March 11, 1933
March 23, 1933	Stephan Tauschitz		Engelbert Dollfuß	Hitler cabinet	March 13, 1938

=== Ambassador to the Federal Republic of Germany ===
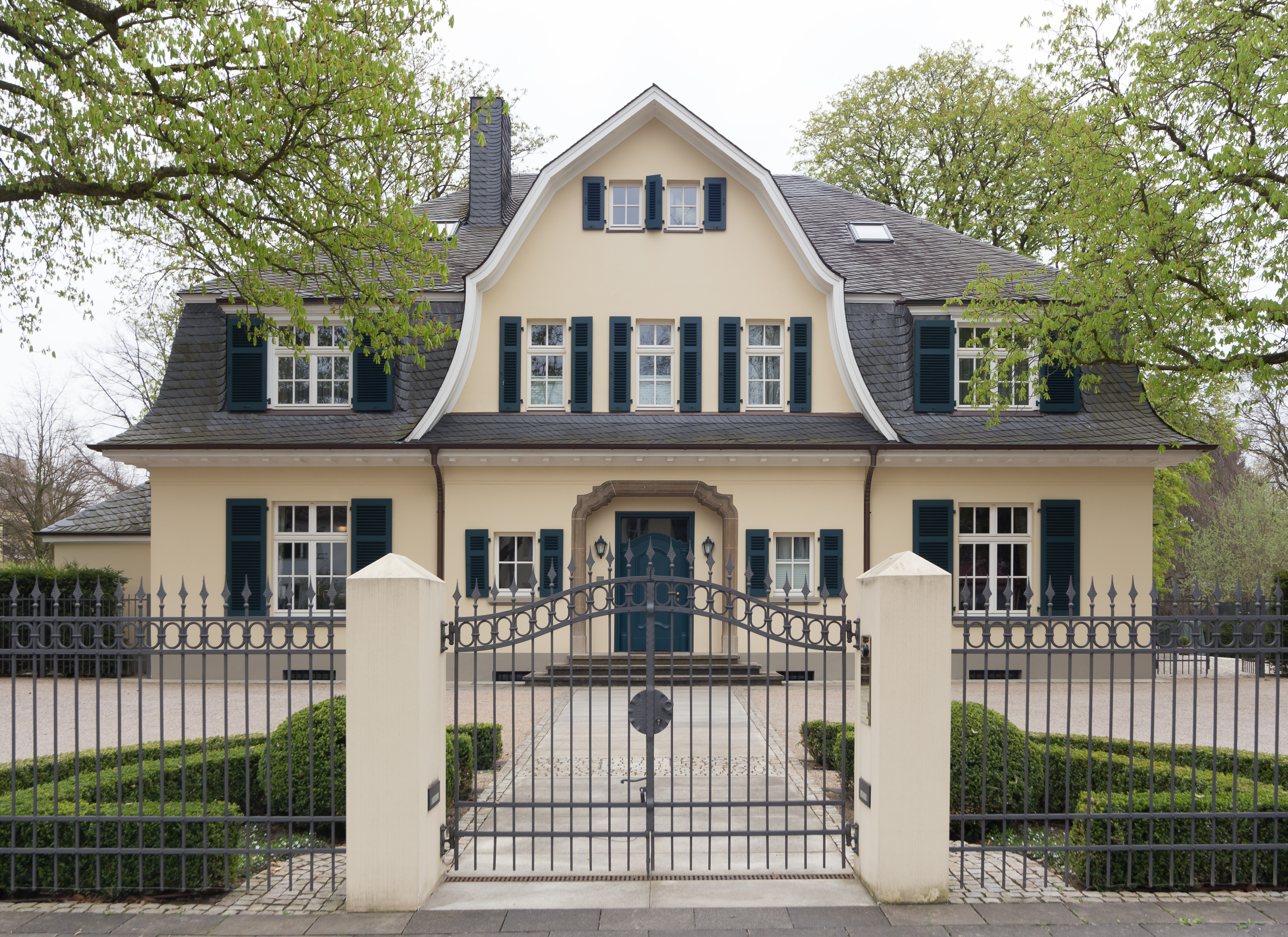
The villa at Friedrich-Wilhelm-Straße 14 in the Bonn district of Gronau, built in the 1920s , served as the residence of the Austrian Ambassador to Germany from 1955 to 1999.

Ambassador of the Second Republic to the Federal Republic of Germany, from 1950 in Bonn, since 1999 in Berlin.

Appointed	Accredited	Name	Title/notes	Appointed during	Accredited during	Left post
June 1, 1950	May 25, 1950	Josef Schöner	Head of the Liaison Office	Leopold Figl	First Adenauer cabinet	June 28, 1953
July 6, 1953	September 14, 1953	Heinrich Schmid	Head of the Liaison Office	Julius Raab	First Adenauer cabinet	March 10, 1954
March 15, 1954	March 31, 1954	Adrian Rotter		Julius Raab	Second Adenauer cabinet	March 10, 1955
November 29, 1955	January 6, 1956	Adrian Rotter	Ambassador	Julius Raab	Second Adenauer cabinet	March 22, 1958
April 1, 1958	April 18, 1958	Josef Schöner		Julius Raab	Third Adenauer cabinet	January 31, 1966
February 7, 1966	February 17, 1966	Karl Gruber		Josef Klaus	Second Erhard cabinet	May 1, 1966
July 20, 1966	July 29, 1966	Rudolf Ender		Josef Klaus	Second Erhard cabinet	July 29, 1970
November 30, 1970	December 15, 1970	Willfried Gredler		Bruno Kreisky	First Brandt cabinet	December 20, 1977
November 21, 1977	January 6, 1978	Franz Pein		Bruno Kreisky	Second Schmidt cabinet	July 25, 1983
August 17, 1983	August 30, 1983	Willibald Pahr		Fred Sinowatz	Second Kohl cabinet	December 31, 1991
January 22, 1986	January 30, 1986	Friedrich Bauer		Fred Sinowatz	Second Kohl cabinet	October 5, 1990
October 9, 1990	October 10, 1990	Herbert Grubmayr		Franz Vranitzky	Third Kohl cabinet	January 23, 1993
January 28, 1993	February 3, 1993	Fritz Hoess		Franz Vranitzky	Fourth Kohl cabinet	December 26, 1997
January 9, 1998	February 16, 1998	Markus Lutterotti	Bonn office	Viktor Klima	Fifth Kohl cabinet	August 12, 1999
	August 13, 1999	Markus Lutterotti	Berlin	Viktor Klima	First Schröder cabinet	November 16, 2002
	2003	Christian Prosl		Wolfgang Schüssel	Second Schröder cabinet	2009
	December 12, 2009	Ralph Scheide		Werner Faymann	First Merkel cabinet	2015
January 2015	February 17, 2015	Nikolaus Marschik		Werner Faymann	Second Merkel cabinet	2017
September 2017	December 15, 2017	Peter Huber		Christian Kern	Third Merkel cabinet	2022
April 2022	June 21, 2022	Michael Linhart	Former Foreign Minister	Karl Nehammer	Scholz cabinet	

== See also ==
- Foreign relations of Austria
- Foreign relations of Germany
