= Austrian Development Agency =

Agency overview
- Type: Private corporation wholly owned by the Federal Government
- Jurisdiction: GmbH
- Headquarters: Vienna 1, Zelinkagasse 2
- Agency executive: Bernd Brünner, Managing Director
- Parent agency: Federal Ministry for Europe, Integration and Foreign Affairs
- Website: www.entwicklung.at/en

Austrian Development Agency (ADA) is Austria's federal agency for development cooperation and humanitarian aid. ADA is a public-benefit, non-profit, limited liability company headquartered in Vienna. It is owned by the Republic of Austria, and represented by the Federal Ministry for European and International Affairs. On behalf of the federal government of Austria, ADA plans, finances, and supports development programs and projects in Africa, Asia, South-Eastern and Eastern Europe. The goal of ADA is to improve conditions of life in developing countries and assist partner countries in their sustainable development. It also promotes projects in development communication and education in Austria to advance discussion on development cooperation.

The ADA's objectives and tasks are defined in the Federal Development Cooperation Act (DCA 2002) as per amendments made in 2003. The respective Three-Year Programme on Austrian Development Policy sets the geographical and substantive priorities. As of 2025, the Austrian Development Agency is led by Bernd Brünner.

== Organisation ==
In direct communication with respective governments, other donors, civil society and the private sector, these administer the programmes and projects and ensure that Austrian resources are put to the most effective use.

== Clients and partners ==
As a federal government agency, ADA provides advice and support to all public institutions, civil society and enterprises in implementing development programmes and projects. These are carried out together with the partners, which are selected via calls to tender, application procedures or calls for proposals.

It also works closely with United Nations agencies, international financial institutions and the European Union. As an accredited agency, ADA implements projects in developing countries on behalf of the European Commission.

In humanitarian crises, ADA relies on competent Austrian and international organisations. After approval by the Council of Ministers, funding is made available for specific measures from the FMEIA's Foreign Disaster Aid Fund.

== Tasks and funding ==
The Austrian Development Agency works towards improving quality of life in partner countries and helps raise awareness of global inter-relations in Austria.

To direct attention and to raise interest in development issues, financial support is provided to projects by civil-society organisations based in Austria and engaged in issues such as human rights, gender equality, environmental protection, world/fair trade and corporate social responsibility (CSR) as well as global learning. Another concern of ADA is to impress on Austrians how development cooperation directly affects their lives.

The Business Partnership Programme is aimed at Austrian or European companies looking to carry out business ideas with added developmental value in Africa, Asia, Latin America and Eastern Europe. From 2004 to 2024, 232 business partnerships were conducted worth a total sum of EUR 67.4 million.
