= Hans Peter Manz =

Austrian diplomat

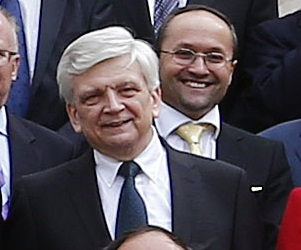
Manz in 2013

Hans Peter Manz (born October 7, 1955 in Canberra, Australia) is an Austrian diplomat. He is the son of Austrian diplomats and grew up in Vienna. Hans Peter Manz graduated from the Theresian Academy in Vienna and then studied law receiving a doctorate from the University of Vienna in 1977. From 2011 to 2015, Manz served as Austrian Ambassador to the United States of America, succeeding Christian Prosl. During his distinguished diplomatic career, Manz served in a variety of positions, including inter alia, foreign policy advisor to the Chancellor of Austria. His overseas postings included Tehran, Bern and New York City.

== Table of Positions ==
- 2011 – 2015: Austrian Ambassador to the United States
- 2007 – 2011: Austrian Ambassador in Bern / Switzerland
- I/2007 – V/2007: Office of Vice Chancellor and Minister for Finance
- X/ 2000 – I/2007: Foreign Policy Advisor to the Federal Chancellor
- I/2000 – IX/2000: Head of the Department for Political Integration and International Cooperation in the field of Justice and Home Affairs, Ministry for Foreign Affairs, Vienna
- IX/1999 – I/2000: Temporary Head of the Department for International Organizations Ministry for Foreign Affairs, Vienna
- 1994–1999: Minister, Deputy Chief of Mission Permanent Mission of Austria to the United Nations, New York
- 1991–1994: Minister-Counselor, Deputy Chief of Mission at the Austrian Embassy in Bern / Switzerland
- 1987-1991: Advisor, Department for Eastern Europe Ministry for Foreign Affairs, Vienna
- 1985–1987: First Secretary and Deputy Chief of Mission Austrian Embassy, Teheran / Iran
- 1981–1985: Second Secretary, Austrian Embassy in Bern / Switzerland
- 1979–1981: Ministry for Foreign Affairs in Vienna
