= List of ambassadors of Austria to Switzerland =

Ambassadors of Austria to Switzerland

Ambassador of the Republic of Austria to Switzerland
- Coat of arms of Austria
- Incumbent; Maria Rotheiser-Scotti since 2021
- Ministry of Foreign Affairs; Embassy of Austria, Bern
- Style: Her Excellency

The Ambassador of the Republic of Austria to Switzerland is the Republic of Austria's foremost diplomatic representative in Switzerland. As head of Austria's diplomatic mission there, the ambassador is the official representative of the president and government of Austria to the President and the Federal Council of Switzerland. The position has the rank and status of an Ambassador Extraordinary and Minister Plenipotentiary and the embassy is located in Bern.

== History ==
As of 2024, around 67,000 Austrians live in Switzerland, making it the second most popular place of residence for Austrians living abroad worldwide. The Embassy in Bern is located at Kirchenfeldstraße 77/79, CH-3000 Bern 6.

== Heads of mission ==
=== Habsburg ambassadors (until 1804) ===
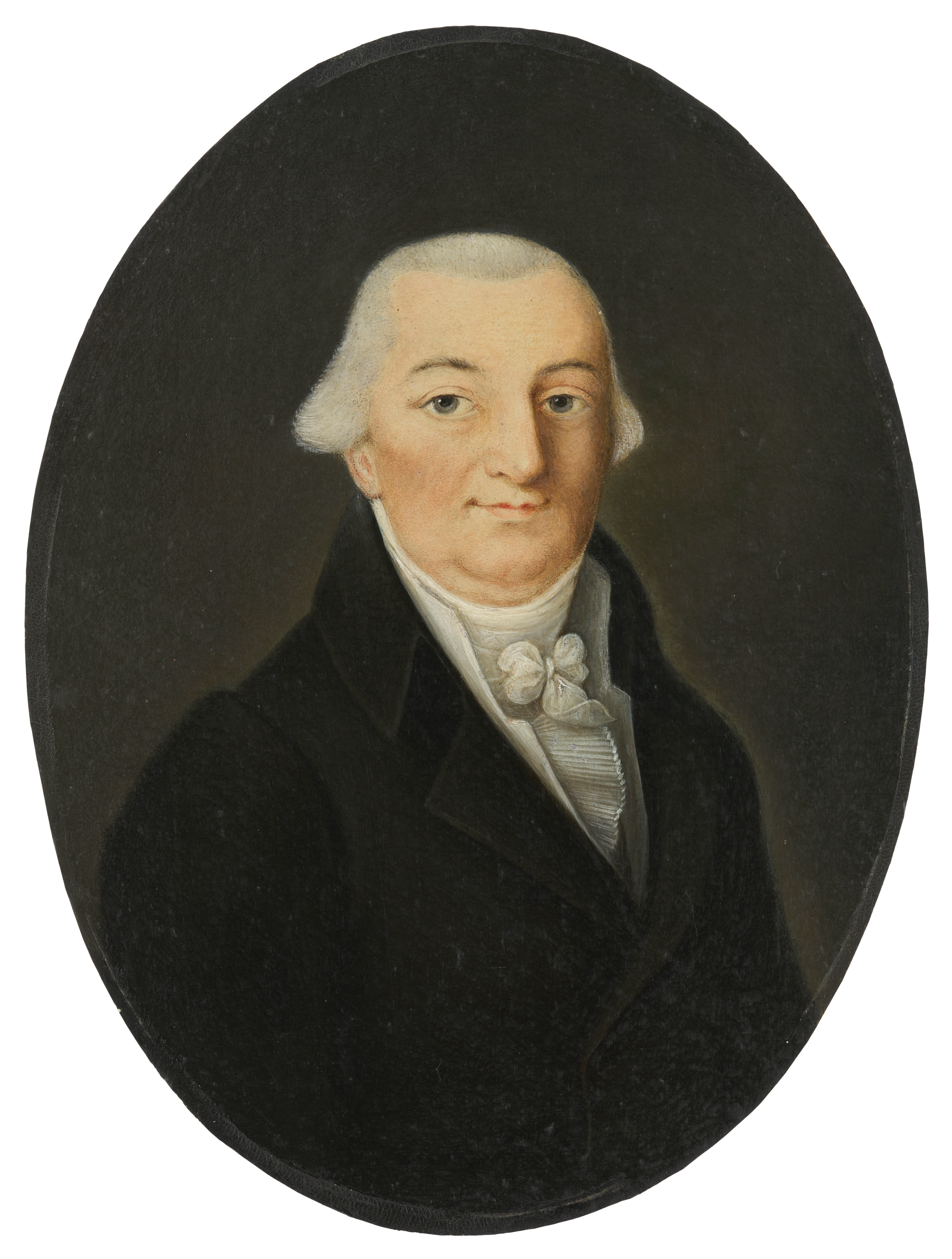
Portrait of Hermann von Greiffenegg, c. 1800

1687: Establishment of diplomatic relations

...

- 1692–1700: Franz Michael Neveu von Windschläg
- 1701–1715: Franz Ehrenreich von Trauttmannsdorff
- 1715–1727: Franz Josef von Hermann (Charge d'Affaires)
- 1727–1732: Paul Nikolaus Dominik von Reichenstein
- 1732–1733: Franz Josef von Hermann (Charge d'Affaires)
- 1733–1746: Giovanni di Prié
- 1746–1767: Karl Marschall von Bieberstein
- 1767–1784: Clemens August Theodor Josef von Nagel zur Loburg
- 1784–1784: Franz H. (Charge d'Affaires)
- 1784–1791: Emanuel von Tassara
- 1791–1793: Hermann von Greiffenegg (Charge d'Affaires)
- 1793–1794: Johann Rudolf von Buol-Schauenstein
- 1794–1794: Franz von Tassara (Charge d'Affaires)
- 1794–1797: Siegmund von Degelmann
- 1797–1798: Hermann von Greiffenegg (Charge d'Affaires)
- 1798–1799: Josef von Steinherr (Charge d'Affaires)
- 1799–1803: unoccupied

=== Austrian ambassadors ===
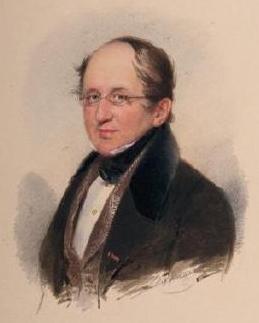
Louis Philippe de Bombelles by Moritz Daffinger (1837)

- 1803–1806: Heinrich von Crumpipen
- 1806–1825: Franz Alban von Schraut
- 1825–1826: Josef Kalasanz von Erberg (Charge d'Affaires)
- 1826–1837: Franz Binder von Krieglstein
- 1837–1843: Louis Philippe de Bombelles
- 1843–1846: Eugen von Philippsberg (Charge d'Affaires)
- 1846–1849: Maximilian von Kaisersfeld
- 1849–1852: Ludwig von Thom
- 1852–1854: Ladislaus von Karnicki (Charge d'Affaires)
- 1854–1856: Alois Kübeck von Kübau
- 1856–1867: Ferdinand von Mensshengen

=== Austro-Hungarian ambassadors ===
- 1867–1868: Nikolaus von Pottenburg (Charge d'Affaires)
- 1868–1887: Moritz von Ottenfels-Gschwind
- 1887–1887: Otto zu Brandis (Charge d'Affaires)
- 1887–1888: Konstantin von Trauttenberg
- 1888–1895: Aloys von Seiller
- 1895–1903: Karl von Kuefstein
- 1903–1909: Karl von Heidler von Egeregg und Syrgenstein
- 1909–1917: Maximilian von Gagern
- 1917–1918: Alexander Musulin von Gomirje

=== Austrian ambassadors (since 1919) ===
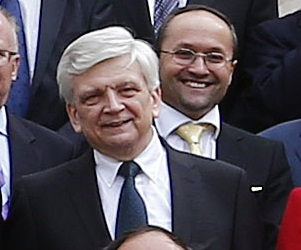
Hans Peter Manz in 2013

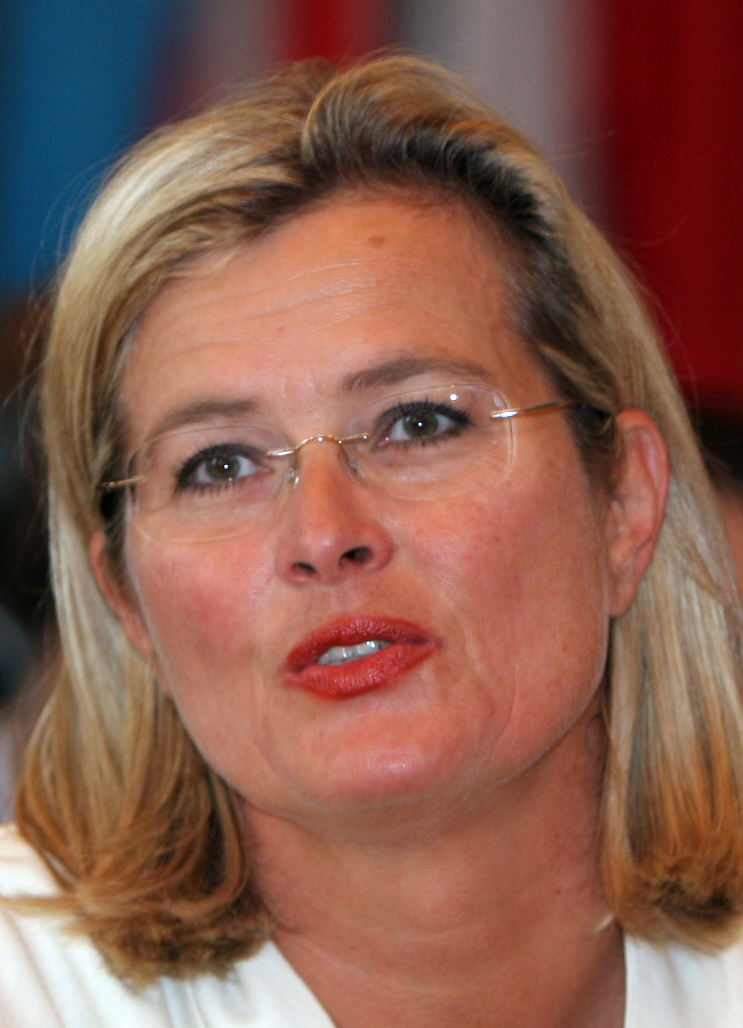
Ursula Plassnik

...

- 1933–1935: Heinrich Schmid

...

1938–1955: Interruption of relations

- 1956–1958: Johannes Coreth
- 1958–1961: Karl Gruber
- 1961–1967: Johann Georg Tursky
- 1967–1972: Erich Bielka
- 1972–1975:
- 1975–1981: Hans Thalberg

...

- 1993–1998: Markus Lutterotti
- 1998–2001: Anton Prohaska
- 2002–2005: Karl Vetter von der Lilie
- 2005–2007: Aurel Saupe
- 2007–2011: Hans Peter Manz
- 2011–2015: Jürgen Meindl
- 2016–2021: Ursula Plassnik
- 2021–Present: Maria Rotheiser-Scotti

== See also ==
- Foreign relations of Austria
- Foreign relations of Switzerland
