= Aloys von Kaunitz-Rietberg =

German nobleman

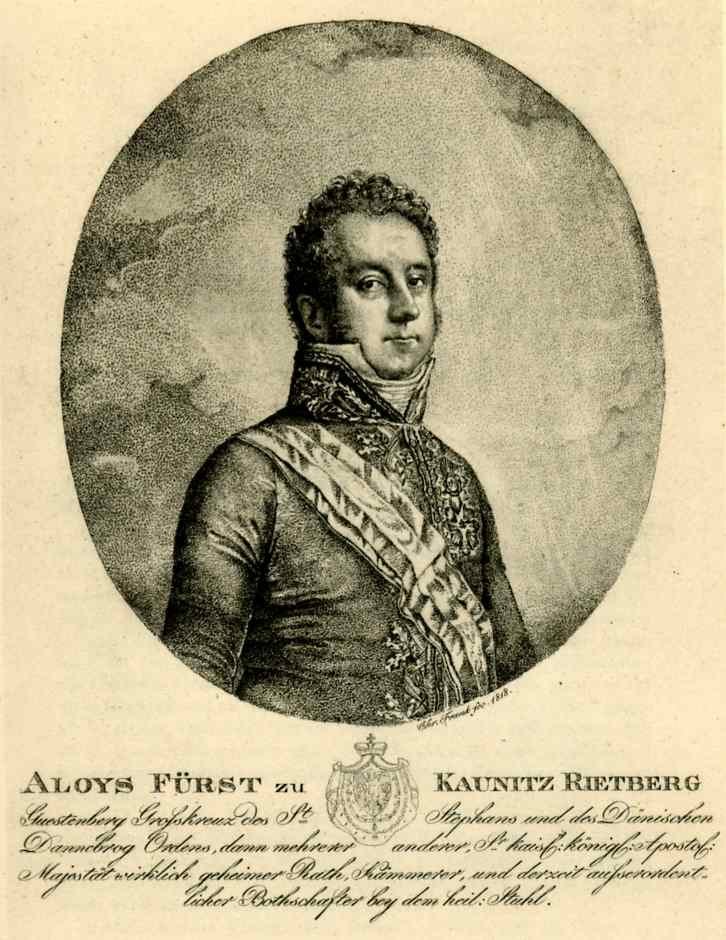
Kaunitz-Rietberg as ambassador to Rome, c. 1818

Aloys Wenzel Dominik, Prince of Kaunitz-Rietberg (19 June 1774 – 15 November 1848) was a German nobleman and a diplomat of the Austrian Empire.

== Early life ==
Kaunitz-Rietberg was born in Vienna on 19 June 1774 into the Kaunitz-Rietberg-Questenberg branch of his family. He was the son of Dominik Andreas von Kaunitz-Rietberg-Questenberg and his wife Countess Bernhardine von Plettenberg-Wittem. His sister Maria Eleonore (1775–1825) was the first wife of Prince Klemens von Metternich.

== Career ==
He was the last Count of Rietberg of his family, but without sovereign power, his father was the last Sovereign of Rietberg since the county was retained in 1806 by the Kingdom of Westphalia, and, after the Congress of Vienna, the Kingdom of Prussia. The Prince served as a diplomat in Dresden, Copenhagen (1801-1804), Naples (1805-1807), Madrid (1815-1817) and the Holy See (1817-1820).

Since the prince's death in 1848, the title has been used in the House of Liechtenstein.

=== Arrest ===
In July 1822, Kaunitz was arrested at his Palace in Vienna and put on trial, charged with multiple rapes and pimping. He was accused of having intercourse with hundreds of young girls, mostly members of the Vienna Children's Ballet. Thanks to his powerful relations, he was just put under house arrest for a while and then was exiled from the capital city to his estate in Moravia.

== Personal life ==
The Prince married Countess Franziska Xaveria Ungnad von Weissenwolff, a daughter of Count Guidobald Ungnad von Weißenwolff and Baroness Josepha Maria Ungnad von Salza. Together, they were the parents of four daughters, including:

- Maria Theresia von Kaunitz-Rietberg (1800–1801), who died young.
- Caroline Léopoldine Jeanne von Kaunitz-Rietberg (1801–1875), who married Major General Count Anton Gundaker von Starhemberg. After his death in 1842, she married Prince Pierre d'Arenberg, third son of Louis Engelbert, 6th Duke of Arenberg.
- Leopoldine von Kaunitz-Rietberg (1803–1888), who married Antal Károly, 3rd Prince Pálffy ab Erdöd.
- Ferdinandine von Kaunitz-Rietberg (1805–1862), who married Ludwig Károlyi de Nagykároly.

The Prince of Kaunitz-Rietberg died in Paris on 15 November 1848. As the last male line descendant of Wenzel Anton, Prince of Kaunitz-Rietberg, he was the last Prince of Kaunitz-Rietberg.

== Bibliography ==
- (in German) Constantin von Wurzbach: Kaunitz, Alois Wenzel Fürst. In: Biographisches Lexikon des Kaiserthums Oesterreich. 11. Theil. Kaiserlich-königliche Hof- und Staatsdruckerei, Wien 1864, S. 63
- (in German) Erwin Matsch: Der Auswärtige Dienst von Österreich(-Ungarn) 1720–1920. Böhlau, Wien/Graz 1986, ISBN 3-205-07269-3.
