= List of ambassadors of Austria =

Lists of ambassadors of Austria may refer to:

- List of ambassadors of Austria to Argentina
- List of ambassadors of Austria to Cuba (embassy accredited for Antigua and Barbuda, Dominica, Grenada, St. Kitts and Nevis, St. Lucia, St. Vincent and the Grenadines, Venezuela, the Dominican Republic and Haiti)
- List of ambassadors of Austria to Denmark
- List of ambassadors of Austria to France
  - List of ambassadors of Austria-Hungary to France
- List of ambassadors of Austria to Japan
- List of ambassadors of Austria to Mexico
- List of ambassadors of Austria to the Netherlands
- List of ambassadors of Austria to the Organisation for Economic Co-operation and Development
- List of ambassadors of Austria to Peru
- List of ambassadors of Austria to the Philippines
- List of ambassadors of Austria to Russia
- List of ambassadors of Austria to South Africa (embassy accredited for Angola, Botswana, Lesotho, Madagascar, Mauritius, Mozambique, Namibia, Zimbabwe, and Eswatini)
- List of ambassadors of Austria to South Korea
- List of ambassadors of Austria to Spain
- List of ambassadors of Austria to Switzerland
- List of ambassadors of Austria to the United States
- List of ambassadors of Austria to the United Kingdom
  - List of ambassadors of Austria-Hungary to the United Kingdom

== See also ==
- List of ambassadors to Austria
- List of ambassadors
- List of diplomatic missions of Austria-Hungary
- Permanent Representative of Austria to the United Nations
