= List of ambassadors of Austria to Venezuela =

Ambassador of Austria to the Bolivarian Republic of Venezuela
- Coat of arms of Austria
- Ministry of Foreign Affairs
- Formation: 1964
- Abolished: August 2018

The following is a list of Austrian ambassadors of the Republic of Austria in the Bolivarian Republic of Venezuela. The Austrian Embassy in Caracas was dissolved in August 2018 and the area of responsibility was taken over by the Austrian Embassy in Havana, Cuba.

== History ==
The embassy in Caracas was opened in the autumn of 1964. At that time, there were only four Austrian embassies in South America. This was followed in 1966 by the independence of Guyana, and successively the various islands in the Caribbean, which were granted Commonwealth independence primarily from the United Kingdom: Trinidad and Tobago in 1962, Barbados in 1966, Grenada (from the United States) in 1974, Dominica in 1978, St. Vincent and the Grenadines in 1979, Antigua and Barbuda in 1981, and St. Kitts and Nevis in 1983.

In 1973 the Caribbean Community (CARICOM) was founded as an international organization with headquarters in Georgetown, Guyana. In 1992, CARIFORUM was founded, and in 2011 the Community of Latin American and Caribbean States (CELAC) was founded, which has since become the most important discussion partner, primarily at this level since Austria joined the European Union. The central basis today is the strategic cooperation between the European Union and Latin America and the Caribbean, the EU-LAC process (EU-Latin America Summit, since 1999), the Cotonou Agreement of 2000, and the Joint EU -Caribbean Partnership Strategy (JECS) of 2012.

In addition, the Caribbean has been a priority region for Austrian Development Cooperation (ADC) since 2007, within the framework of which the regional office of the United Nations Office for the Coordination of Humanitarian Affairs (UNOCHA) is also supported. The Austrian Development Agency (ADA), which implements the ADC, does not operate an office in this region.

The announcement of the relocation of the embassy to Bogotá after 2015 was also criticized because of Venezuela's economic importance, especially as an OPEC member.

As of 1 September 2016, the Austrian Embassy in Caracas was headed by a Chargé d'Affaires. In August 2018, the embassy was finally closed and responsibility for the Bolivarian Republic of Venezuela was transferred to the Austrian Embassy in Havana.

== Austrian ambassadors ==
Name	Term Start	Term End	Notes
	...	...	
Harald Gödel	1971	1976	Previously Ambassador to Finland, and Chile
	...	...	
Alfred Missong Jr.	1982	1986	Previously Ambassador to Mexico; later to Portugal, Director of the Diplomatic Academy of Vienna, OSCE Mission to Chechnya
	...	...	
Erika Liebenwein	1999	2004	Previously Ambassador to Colombia; afterwards at the Ministry of Foreign Affairs, Ambassador to Brazil
Marianne Feldmann	2004	2008	Later Ambassador to Colombia and St. Vincent and the Grenadines
Thomas Schuller-Götzburg	2008	2012	Later Ambassador to Azerbaijan.
Gerhard Mayer	2012	2016	Previously Deputy Head of Mission in Argentina

== See also ==
- Lists of ambassadors of Austria

== See also ==
- Foreign relations of Austria
