= Schallenberg (surname) =

Schallenberg is a German surname. Notable people with the surname include:

- Schallenberg family, Austrian noble family
  - Alexander Schallenberg (born 1969), Chancellor of Austria
  - Wolfgang Schallenberg (1930–2023), Austrian diplomat, father of Alexander
  - Herbert, Count of Schallenberg (1901–1974), Austrian diplomat, father of Wolfgang and grandfather of Alexander
- Edmund Schallenberg (1913–1999), American handball player
- Kolja Schallenberg (born 1984), German theatre director
- Ron Schallenberg (born 1998), German professional footballer

== See also ==
- Schallenberg Castle, ruined castle in Austria, namesake of the noble family
- Schallenberg Pass, a mountain pass of Bern, Switzerland
