= List of ambassadors of Austria to France =

Ambassadors of Austria to France

Ambassador of the Republic of Austria to France
- Coat of arms of Austria
- Incumbent; Wolfgang Wagner (as Chargé d'Affaires) since 2023
- Ministry of Foreign Affairs; Embassy of Austria, Paris
- Style: His Excellency
- Inaugural holder: Johann Andreas von Eichhoff
- Formation: 1919
- Website: Austrian Embassy, Paris

The Ambassador of the Republic of Austria to France is the Republic of Austria's foremost diplomatic representative in France. As head of Austria's diplomatic mission there, the ambassador is the official representative of the president and government of Austria to the Prime Minister and the government of France. The position has the rank and status of an Ambassador Extraordinary and Minister Plenipotentiary and the embassy is located in Paris.

== Austrian Ambassadors (since 1919) ==
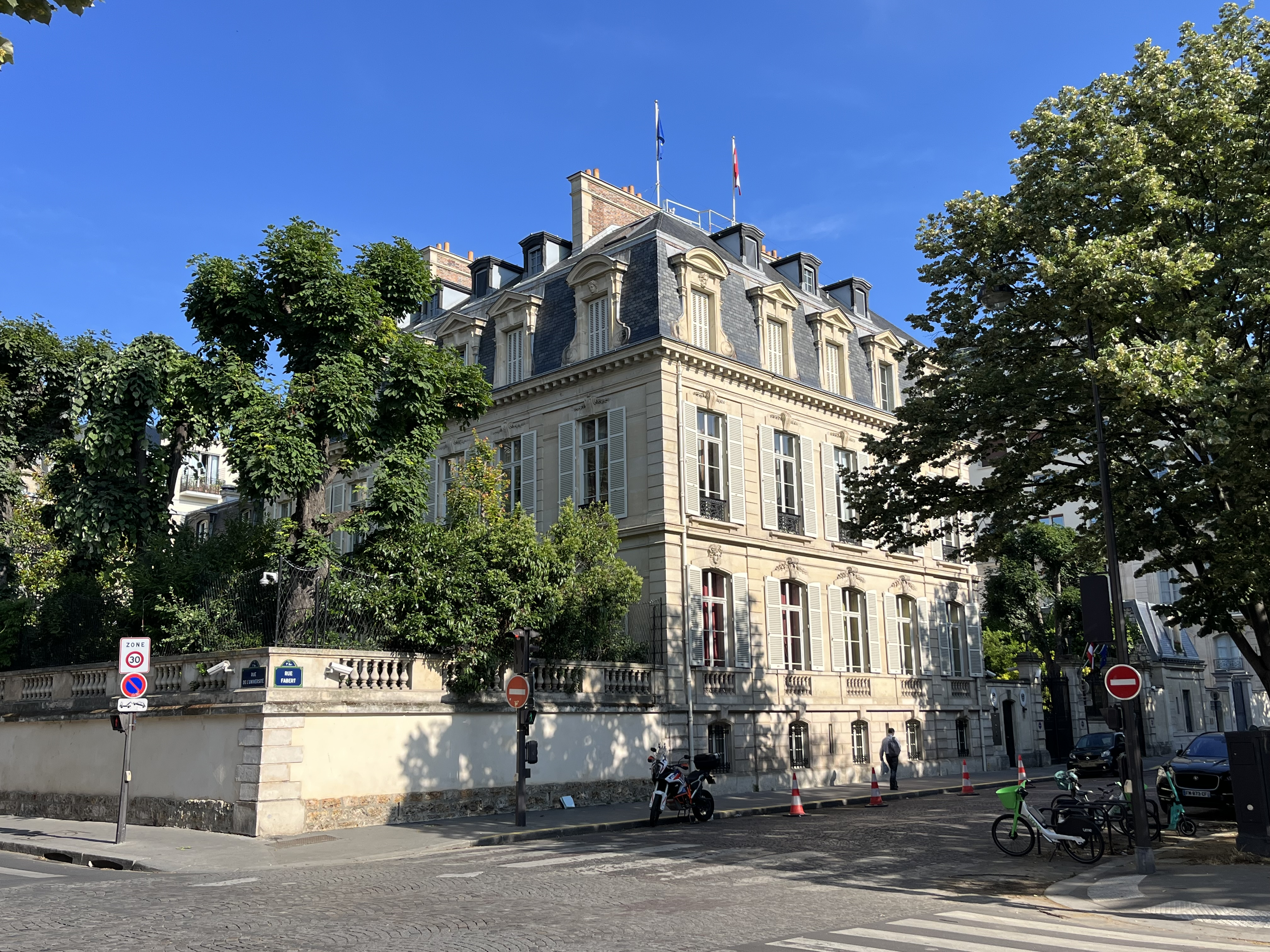
Austrian Embassy in Paris, Rue Fabert 6

1919: Establishment of diplomatic relations

- 1919–1925: Johann Andreas von Eichhoff Plenipotentiary to the Supreme Council and to the French Government, from 3 September 1920 Ambassador and Plenipotentiary Minister in Paris.
- 1925–1932: Alfred Grünberger, Extraordinary Ambassador and Minister of Austria in Paris and Madrid
- 1932–1933: Heinrich Schmid, Chargé d'Affaires
- 1933–1933: Otto Günther
- 1933–1936:
- 1936–1938: Alois Vollgruber
- 1938–1945: No diplomatic relations as a result of the Anschluss and World War II
- 1945–1955: There were no official Austrian diplomatic missions abroad due to the occupation (diplomatic contacts via the French High Commissioner, and from 1950 also ambassadors)
- 1946–1946: Norbert Bischoff as representative of the Austrian government to the government in Paris
- ...
- Resumption of relations after the restoration of Austria
- 1950–1953: Heinrich Schmid Envoy 1950-1951 Ambassador 1951-1953
- 1953–1958: Alois Vollgruber
- 1958–1962: Adrian Rotter
- 1962–1969: Martin Fuchs
- 1969–1972: Ernst Lemberger
- 1972–1974: Erich Bielka-Karltreu
- 1974–1982: Otto Eiselsberg
- 1983–1988: Eric Nettel
- 1988–1993: Wolfgang Schallenberg
- 1993–1997: Eva Nowotny
- 1997–2002: Franz Ceska
- 2002–2007: Anton Prohaska
- 2007–2011: Hubert Heiss
- 2011–2016: Ursula Plassnik
- 2017–2018: Walter Grahammer
- 2018–2021: Michael Linhart
- 2021–2022: Wolfgang Wagner, Chargé d'Affaires
- 2022–2023: Thomas Schnöll, Chargé d'Affaires
- 2023–present: Wolfgang Wagner, Chargé d'Affaires

== See also ==
- Austria–France relations
- List of ambassadors of France to Austria
