= List of ambassadors of Austria to Cuba =

Ambassador of Austria to Cuba
- Coat of arms of Austria
- Incumbent; Gabriele Méon-Tschürtz since December 2022
- Ministry of Foreign Affairs
- Formation: 1964

The following is a list of Austrian ambassadors of the Republic of Austria in the Bolivarian Republic of Venezuela. The Austrian Embassy in Caracas was dissolved in August 2018 and the area of responsibility was taken over by the Austrian Embassy in Havana, Cuba.

== History ==
In 1895, Johann Friedrich Berndes was the Austro-Hungarian Consul General in Havana. In the 1950s and 1960s, the ambassadors in Mexico City were also accredited to the governments in Havana. The Austrian embassy in Havana was opened in 1978 with Peter Hohenfellner as head of the mission.

As of 2018, the embassy is also responsible for Antigua and Barbuda, Dominica, Grenada, St. Kitts and Nevis, St. Lucia, St. Vincent and the Grenadines, Venezuela, the Dominican Republic and Haiti.

The current ambassador presented her credentials to President and First Secretary of the Communist Party of Cuba Miguel Díaz-Canel on 12 January 2023, along with the ambassadors of Greece, Colombia, Syria, Pakistan, Azerbaijan, Jamaica, Order of Malta, Malta and Gambia.

== Austrian ambassadors ==
Name	Term Start	Term End	Appointed by	First Secretary	Notes
Peter Hohenfellner	1978	1981	Bruno Kreisky	Fidel Castro	Later Ambassador in Beirut; Representative to the UN Security Council; President of the UN Security Council
Elmar Gamper	1982	1985	Bruno Kreisky	Fidel Castro	
Christoph Parisini	1987	1990	Fred Sinowatz	Fidel Castro	Born 1939
Yuri Standenat	1994	1999	Franz Vranitzky	Fidel Castro	Later Ambassador in Buenos Aires
Helga Konrad	2000	2005	Wolfgang Schüssel	Fidel Castro	
Johannes Skriwan	2006	2010	Wolfgang Schüssel	Fidel Castro	
Andreas Rendl	2010	2014	Werner Faymann	Raúl Castro	Born 1964
Gerlinde Paschinger	2014	2014	Werner Faymann	Raúl Castro	
Stefan Weidinger	2018	2022	Sebastian Kurz	Raúl Castro	Born 1957
Gabriele Méon-Tschürtz	2022	Incumbent	Alexander Schallenberg	Miguel Díaz-Canel	Born 1962

== See also ==
- Lists of ambassadors of Austria

== See also ==
- Foreign relations of Austria
