= List of ambassadors of Austria to South Africa =

Ambassadors of Austria to South Africa

Ambassador of the Republic of Austria to South Africa
- Coat of arms of Austria

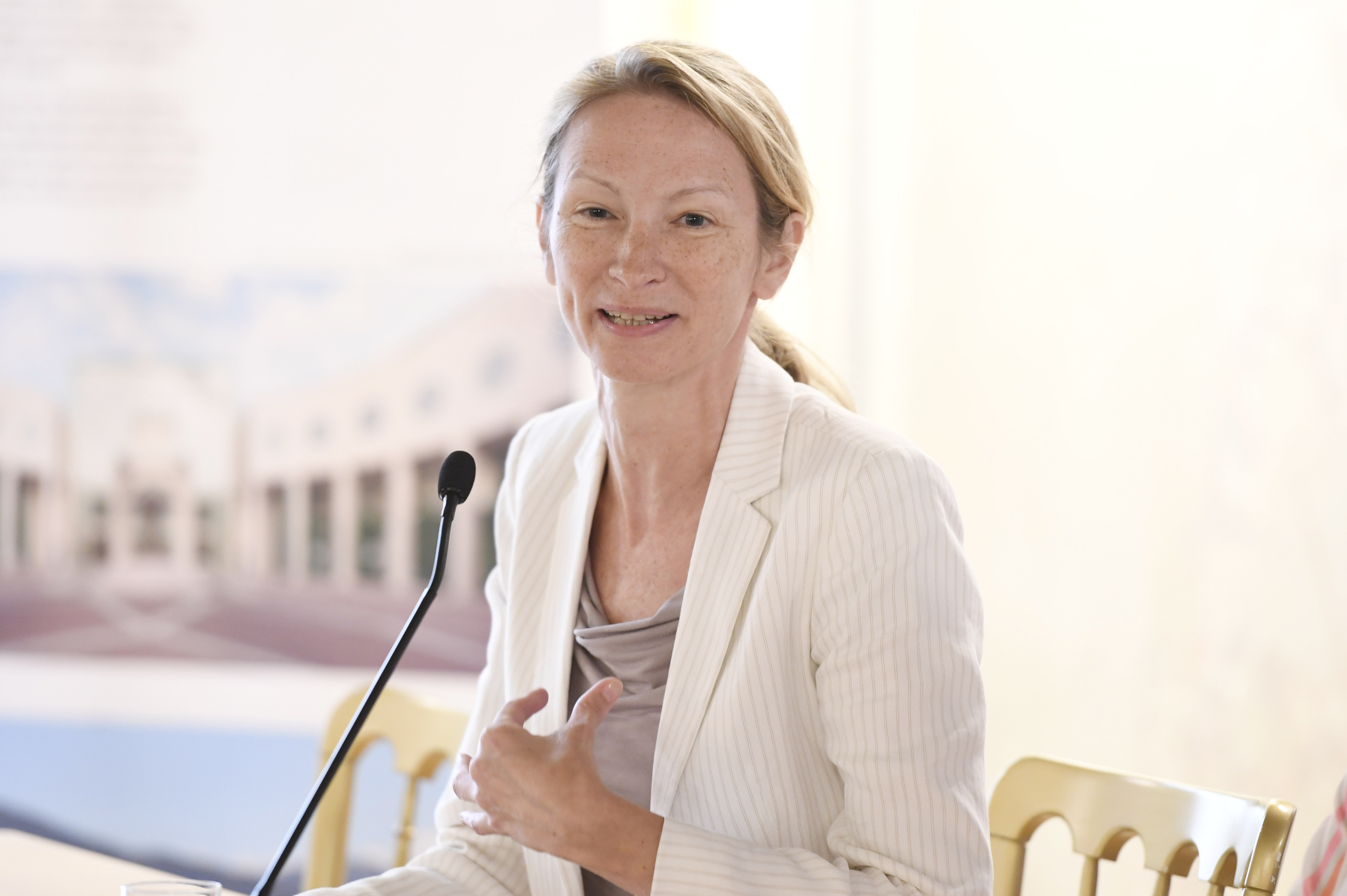
- Incumbent; Romana Königsbrun since 2022
- Ministry of Foreign Affairs; Embassy of Austria, Pretoria
- Style: Her Excellency
- Website: Austrian Embassy, Pretoria

The Ambassador of the Republic of Austria to South Africa is the Republic of Austria's foremost diplomatic representative in South Africa. As head of Austria's diplomatic mission there, the ambassador is the official representative of the president and government of Austria to the Prime Minister and the government of South Africa. The position has the rank and status of an Ambassador Extraordinary and Minister Plenipotentiary and the embassy is located in Cape Town.

The embassy's area of responsibility also includes the Republic of Angola, the Republic of Botswana, the Kingdom of Lesotho, the Republic of Madagascar, the Republic of Mauritius, the Republic of Mozambique, the Republic of Namibia, the Republic of Zimbabwe, and the Kingdom of Eswatini.

== History ==
The embassy in South Africa opened in 1955. Its jurisdiction includes several countries in Southern Africa for which there is no embassy of its own.

The Consulate General in South Africa was located in Cape Town but was closed in October 2010. The Austrian Embassy in Harare (the capital and largest city of Zimbabwe) was closed on 1 January 2012 for security reasons, and its jurisdiction was divided between the embassies in Pretoria and Nairobi, whereby Pretoria also took over the representation for Zimbabwe, Mozambique and Angola.

== Austrian Ambassadors ==
Name	Term start	Term end	Notes
Austria → South Africa (Botswana, Lesotho, Madagascar, Mauritius, Namibia, Eswatini)
Wilhelm Görtz	1955	1959	
Eduard Schiller	1959	1962	
Franz Rader	1962	1964	Acting Ambassador from 29 December 1962 to 18 March 1964
Adolf Heinrich Hobel	1964	1968	Previously Ambassador to Bulgaria and Finland; later to Chile
Paul Zedtwitz	1968	1972	Previously Counsellor and Chargé d'Affaires in the United States, Chile, Ethiopia; later in Algeria
Ernst Hessenberger	1972	1975	
Arnold Möbius	1975	1979	
Michael Fitz.	1979	1983	
Johann Plattner	1983	1986	
Alexander Christiani	1986	1990	Previously Head of the department for the Near and Middle East in the Foreign Ministry, member of the delegation to the UN General Assembly, Ambassador to the United Kingdom, and the Netherlands
Arnold Möbius	1990	1994	Second term
Franz Palla	1994	1999	
Kurt Spallinger	1999	2003	
Helmut Freudenschuss	2003	2008	Previously a member of the Permanent Representative to the UN in New York and Alternate Representative in the Security Council, Head of Coordination Department of the Ministry of Foreign Affairs, Ambassador to Lebanon; later Head of Sub-Saharan Africa Department at the Ministry of Foreign Affairs, Foreign Policy Advisor to the President.
Otto Ditz	2008	2012	Since January 2012: Austria → Zimbabwe, Angola, Mozambique
Otto Ditz	2008	2012	Previously Ambassador to Saudi Arabia, and Canada and Jamaica.
Brigitte Öppinger-Walchshofer	2013	2017	Previously Ambassador to Ethiopia and Deputy Representative to the African Union, and Head of Austrian Development Cooperation.
Johann Brieger	2018	2022	Previously Ambassador to Kosovo, Deputy Head of the Service Section (at Ambassadorial level), Permanent Representative to the IACA and member of the supervisory board of the ADA
Romana Königsbrun	2022	Present	Accredited to Angola, Botswana, Eswatini, Lesotho, Madagascar, Mauritius, Mozambique, Namibia and Zimbabwe.

== See also ==
- Foreign relations of Austria
- Foreign relations of South Africa
