= Archives of Yugoslavia =

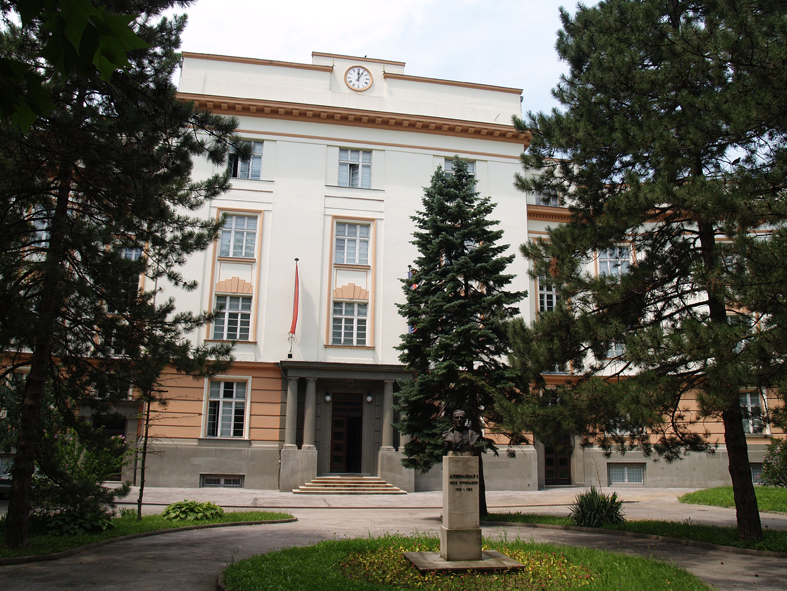
- Established: 1950
- Location: Senjak, Belgrade, Serbia
- Coordinates: 44.789115°N 20.44197°E
- Website: www.arhivyu.rs

The Archives of Yugoslavia (Serbian: Архив Југославије, Arhiv Jugoslavije), in Belgrade, Serbia, house and protect the archival materials produced by state bodies and organizations of Yugoslavia from 1918 to 2006. They currently exist as a cultural institution, museum, and library. The archives building is located in Senjak, which belongs to a designated cultural-historical area of Topčider, famous for its numerous public and private buildings that have cultural heritage status.

== History ==
The archives of the Yugoslav state were founded in 1950, under the name State Archives of the Federal People's Republic of Yugoslavia (FNRJ). Three years later the name was changed to the State Archives of FNRJ, and in 1964, to the Archives of Yugoslavia. The Archives retained this name until 2003, when, as a consequence of the establishment of a State Union of Serbia and Montenegro, they were renamed the Archives of Serbia and Montenegro. In 2009, the Government of Serbia reinstated previous name and granted the archives the status of high cultural importance.

In 1958, the reading room was opened for international researchers with Ivo John Lederer as the first non-Yugoslav historian investigating Yugoslav delegation at the Paris Peace Conference. Since then, numerous historians, publicists, and diplomats from various countries have utilized the archives collections. Austrian researchers Yuri Standenat, Gustav Chalupa and Felix Ermacora were brought to the archives in 1987 due to investigations into the wartime past of former UN Secretary-General and Austrian President Kurt Waldheim, making him a "persona non grata" in the USA.

== Archives and collections ==
Within its 840 archives and collections, the Archives of Yugoslavia house 24.5 kilometers of records created between 1914 and 2006. The materials relate to the activities of the central government and state authorities in the areas of the domestic and foreign policy, finance, economy, healthcare, education, culture, social policy, justice, banking, and other topics.

Archival records from the period of the Kingdom of Yugoslavia comprise 146 archives of materials created between 1918 and 1945. The archival materials of the post-war Yugoslavia comprise 633 archives generated in the period between 1945 and 2006.

== Building of the Archives ==
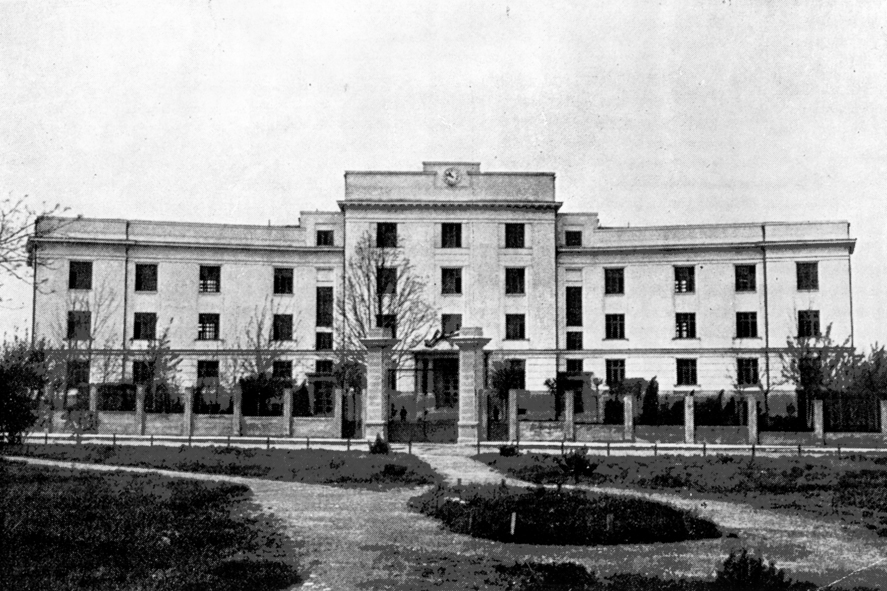
Residential Home for Secondary School Students King Aleksandar I, 1933

Erected in 1933 on the location of the First Non-commissioned Infantry Officer School "King Aleksandar I", the building was first called The Residential Home for Secondary School Students King Aleksandar I.

Vojin Petrović designed the impressive three-story building in the Modernist style. Its use changed with the beginning of the Second World War and the occupation, during which it housed the Headquarters of the Gestapo, as well as a section of the German military command for the South-West. After the war the building housed the Communist Party and a police school.

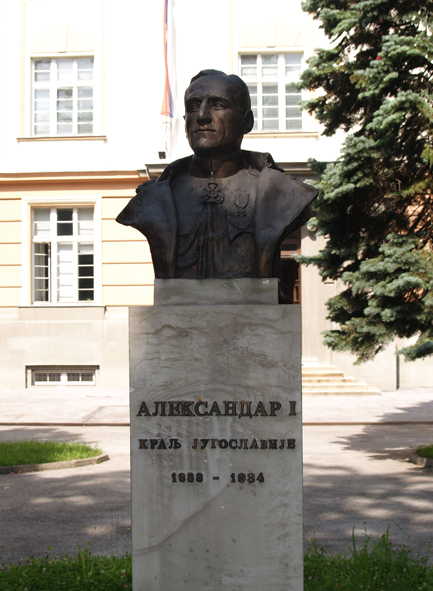
Bust of King Aleksandar I in courtyard of the Archives of Yugoslavia

In 2003, a bust of King Aleksandar I, made from a sculpture created in 1936 by Slavko Miletić, was returned to the courtyard of the archives building.

On 22 March 2007, the Serbian government declared the archives building a Cultural Heritage Site of Serbia.

== See also ==
- List of archives in Serbia
- State Archives of Serbia
- Yugoslav Cinematheque
- Museum of Yugoslavia
- Yugoslav Drama Theatre
