= List of ambassadors of Austria to Argentina =

Ambassador of Austria to the Republic of Argentina
- Coat of arms of Austria

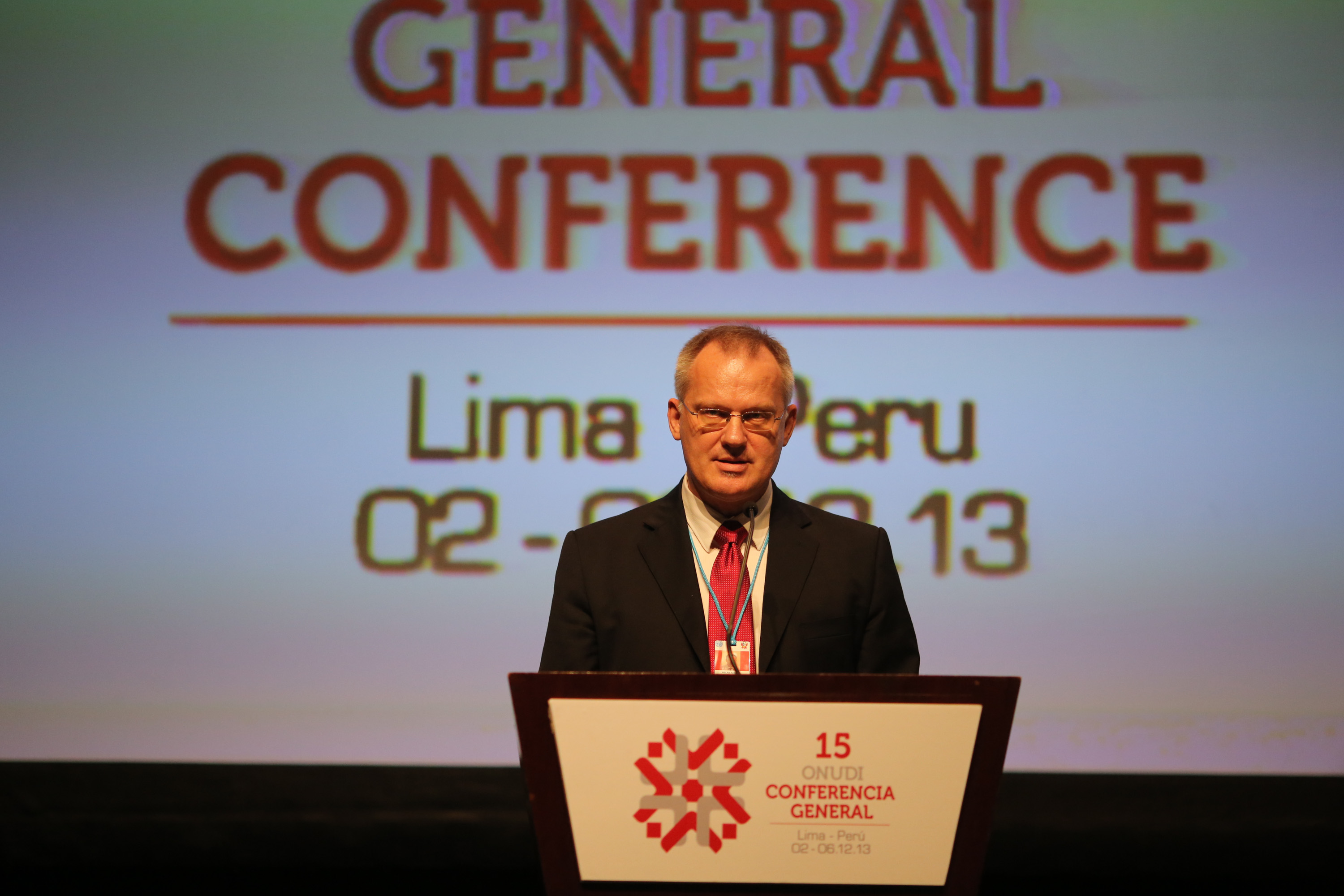
- Incumbent; Andreas Melán since 2021
- Ministry of Foreign Affairs
- Formation: 1872

The following is a list of Austrian ambassadors in Argentina. The seat of the embassy is the Austrian Embassy in Buenos Aires.

== History ==
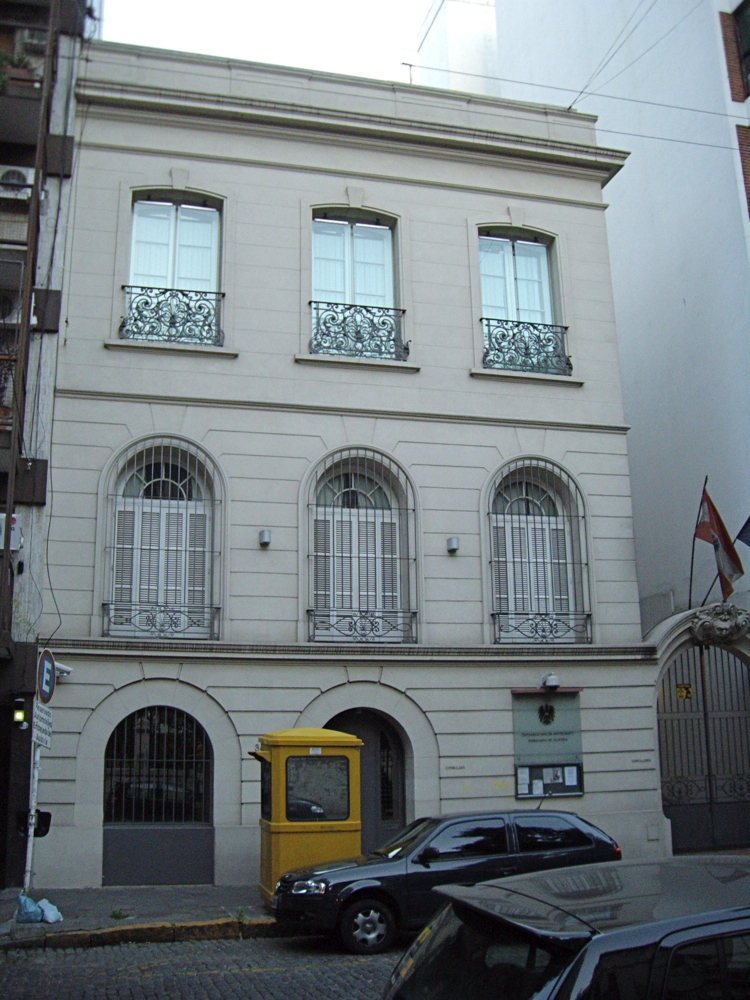
Austrian Embassy, Buenos Aires

The official area includes the countries of Argentina, Paraguay and Uruguay. Austria has had diplomatic relations with Argentina since 15 December 1872.

== Ambassadors ==
Name	Image	Term Start	Term End	Notes
Hugo Rhemen von Barensfeld		1904		
Otto von Hoenning O'Carrol		1911	1918	Minister of Franz Joseph I of Austria
Miloslav Kobr		1912	1918	Consul General
Alfons Knaffl-Lenz		1928	1931	
Otto Günther		1948	1950	
Stephan Tauschitz		1950	1954	
Max Löwenthal-Chlumecky		1954	1955	
Meinrad Falser		1956	1958	
Wolfgang Höller		1958	1964	
Hans J. Mathé		1983		Ambassador to Peru from 1968 to 1969
Albert Rohan	Albert Rohan	1985	1989	Secretary General of the Austrian Ministry from 1996 to 2001
Gerhard Heible		1990		
Wolfgang Kriechbaum		1994		Ambassador to Portugal from 2000 to 2004
Yuri Standenat		1999		
Gudrun Graf	Gudrun Graf	2004		
Robert Zischg		2010	2013	
Karin Proidl		2013	2017	
Christoph Meran		2017	2021	
Andreas Melán	Andreas Melán	2021	Present	Ambassador to Peru and Ethiopia

== See also ==
- Lists of ambassadors of Austria

== See also ==
- Argentina-Austria relations
- Foreign relations of Austria
