= Centre for Financial Reporting Reform =

The Centre for Financial Reporting Reform (CFRR), part of the World Bank’s Governance Global Practice. It works with client countries in Europe and Central Asia to implement good corporate governance and financial reporting practices and standards.

The CFRR provides a range of diagnostic assessments, technical assistance, knowledge and convening services in the fields of audit, accounting, financial reporting and the implementation of international standards in these areas. Partners include the European Union, the Austrian Development Cooperation, the Swiss State Secretariat for Economic Affairs (SECO) and the Federal Ministry of Finance of the Republic of Austria.

== History ==
The CFRR was established in 2007. It is located in Vienna, Austria (the formal "seat agreement" was signed on 21 July 2010 between the World Bank and the Government of Austria.)

Programs managed by the CFRR offer expert advice, knowledge and capacity development assistance, analytical and advisory services, learning and skill development, know-how and knowledge transfer, and technical assistance and institutional strengthening in the areas of corporate financial reporting and corporate governance. They include:

=== The Road to Europe: Program of Accounting Reform and Institutional Strengthening (EU-REPARIS) ===
A regional program for EU enlargement candidates, or potential candidates, in Southeast Europe to integrate more closely with the EU and the EU’s internal market, and align their legislative frameworks with the EU acquis communautaire in the area of financial reporting. Launched in 2015, this program builds on the success of the REPARIS program from 2008 to 2014. The program addresses the need for better institutional frameworks, aligned with the acquis and harmonized regionally; encourages the accounting profession to offer enterprises, especially SMEs, effective business support services and advice on accessing finance and complying with regulatory requirements; helps stakeholders better understand the relationship between improved financial reporting and access to finance; and develops supportive networks of institutions among the countries of Southeast Europe, building sustainability and improving awareness of the benefits and successful approaches to corporate financial reporting reform.

=== Strengthening Auditing and Reporting in the Countries of the Eastern Partnership (STAREP) ===
A regional program launched in 2013 aimed at creating a transparent policy environment and effective institutional framework for corporate reporting within the countries that make up the EU’s Eastern Partnership. STAREP helps participating countries improve their frameworks for corporate financial reporting and raise the capacity of local institutions to implement these frameworks effectively. It is addressed to all those with an interest in the process of corporate financial reporting reform and activities are tailored to meet the varying needs of different compilers and users of financial statements including those designing and implementing reforms such as ministries of finance; the accounting profession; financial regulators; and teachers of accounting in universities.

=== Financial Reporting Technical Assistance Program (FRTAP) ===
This program for new EU member states supports countries in the field of financial reporting. It assists in the implementation of sustainable regulatory and institutional frameworks and in furthering the correct implementation of the acquis communautaire in the area of financial reporting. Funds for this program are provided by the Swiss State Secretariat for Economic Affairs under the Swiss Enlargement Contribution to the European Union.

=== Accounting and Auditing Reports on the Observance of Standards and Codes (A&A ROSC) ===
A&A ROSCs help countries to plan, implement and monitor progress in strengthening the country’s corporate financial reporting regime. Reports analyze the use of national accounting and auditing standards and comparability with international standards; assess strengths and weaknesses of the institutional framework in supporting high-quality financial reporting; and make recommendations and suggestions for improvements. The CFRR have undertaken A&A ROSC reviews in 30 countries at the invitation of governments.
