= Ceska =

Ceska, Česká, or Češka may refer to:

- The name of Czech Republic in Czech and the corresponding adjective
- Česká, a village and municipality in the Czech Republic
- Franz Ceska (1936–2026), Austrian diplomat
- Michal Češka (born 1992), Czech ice dancer
- Zdeněk Češka (1929–2023), Czech politician, attorney, academic and lawyer
