= Heinz Standenat =

Austrian diplomat

Heinrich "Heinz" Standenat (5 August 1913 – 1992) was an Austrian diplomat.

== Early life ==
Standenat was born on 5 August 1913 in Vienna. He was the son of Ansy Hardung and Rudolf Standenat. Standenat studied law at the University of Vienna and the University of Paris and received a doctorate in law.

== Career ==
After 1945, Heinrich Standenat was a freelance journalist and employee of Radio Vienna. At the end of 1947, he joined the foreign service and was employed by the Economic Liaison Office in Paris. When this was upgraded to an embassy, he was a confidant of the Socialists and a member of the Austrian delegation to the OECD. From 1955 he headed the multilateral economic relations department in the Foreign Ministry and negotiated the coal and steel agreement between the EU and Austria.

=== Diplomatic career ===
From 1958 to 1962 he was ambassador in Cairo and was co-accredited to the governments in Khartoum and Addis Ababa. From 1962 to 1965 he headed the economic policy section in the Ministry of Foreign Affairs. From 1965 to 1968 he was ambassador in Madrid. From 1968 to 1972 he was again ambassador in Cairo and accredited to the governments of Aden, People's Democratic Republic of Yemen, Somalia and Sudan. From 1975 to 1978 he was ambassador in Moscow.

== Personal life ==
Standenat was married to Inge Kichniawy. His children were Yuri Wolfgang Standenat (b. 1940), who also became a diplomat, and Julika Standenat Kruse.

Standenat died in 1992 and was buried at the Vienna Central Cemetery.

== See also ==
- List of diplomatic missions of Austria

Diplomatic posts
Preceded by Olivier Resseguier	Austrian Ambassador to Egypt; 1958–1962	Succeeded by Hermann Gohn
Preceded by Karl Gruber	Austrian Ambassador to Spain; 1965–1968	Succeeded by Wolfgang Höller
Preceded by Gordian Gudenus	Austrian Ambassador to Egypt; 1968–1972	Succeeded by Gregor Woschnagg
Preceded by Heinrich Haymerle	Austrian Ambassador to the USSR; 1973–1978	Succeeded by Gerald Hinteregger
