= Romana Königsbrun =

Her Excellency Romana Königsbrun
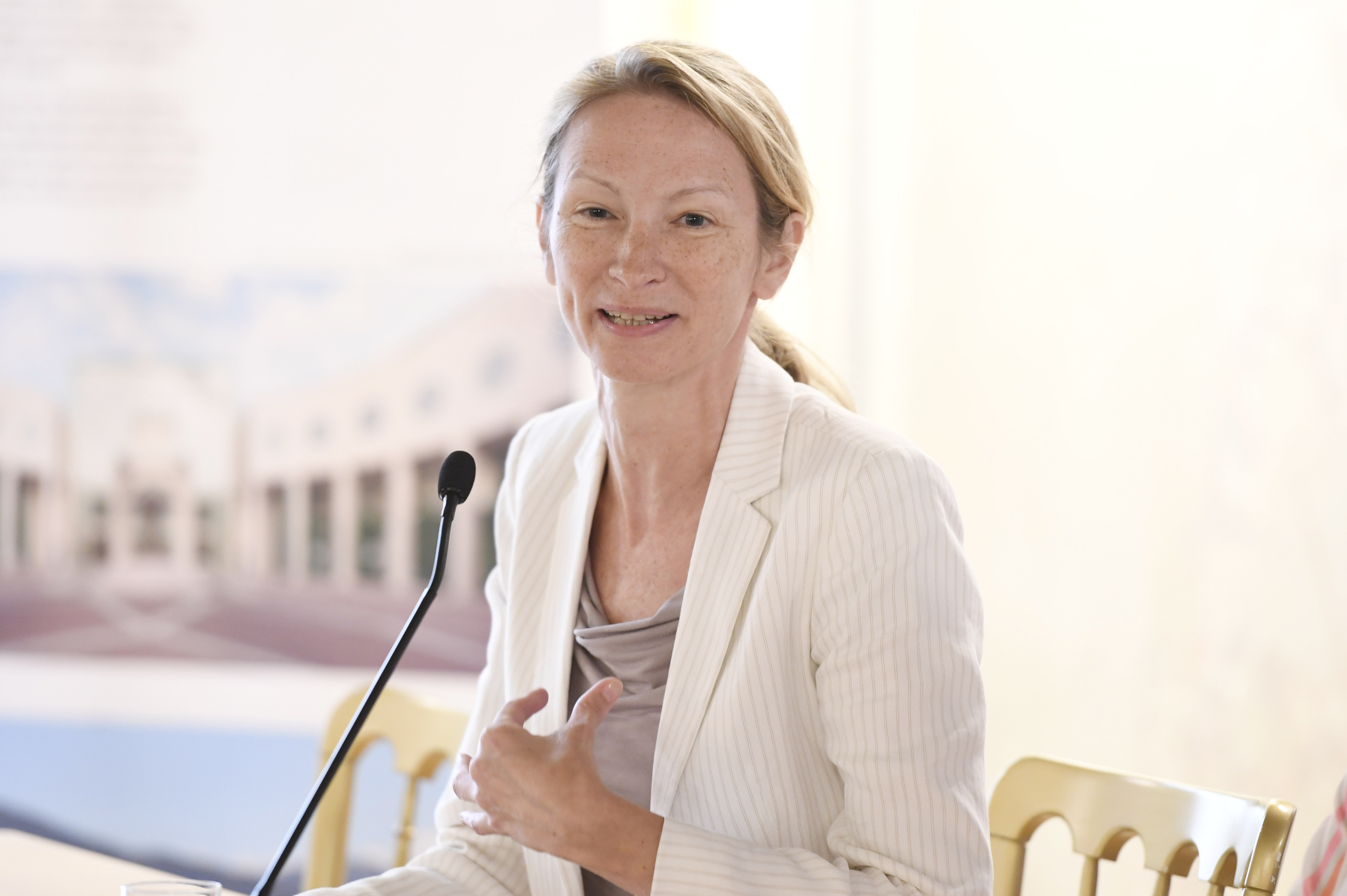

Austrian Ambassador to South Africa
- Incumbent
- Assumed office 2022
- Preceded by: Johann Brieger

Personal details
- Born: 15 July 1970 (age 56) Graz, Austria
- Spouse: Gerald Schweighöfer
- Education: University of Graz

Romana Königsbrun (born 15 July 1970) is an Austrian diplomat who has been the Austrian ambassador to South Africa since 2022.

== Early life ==
Königsbrun was born in Graz, Austria on 15 July 1970. She graduated with a degree in English and History from the University of Graz, Austria, in 1994.

== Career ==
Königsbrun joined the Ministry of Foreign Affairs in 1996. She has served as Deputy Head of Mission at the Austrian Embassy Nairobi, Kenya, and Deputy Permanent Representative at the UN Environment Programme and the UN Human Settlements Programme from 2003 to 2007. From 2007 to 2011, she was Deputy Head of Mission at the Austrian Embassy in Jakarta, Indonesia. From 2011 to 2015, Königsbrun was based in Vienna serving as Head of Unit for personnel issues and recruitment. From 2015 to 2019 she was Consul and Director of the Austrian Cultural Forum in Istanbul, Turkey.

In 2022, Königsbrun was appointed to succeed Johann Brieger as the Austrian ambassador to South Africa, based in Pretoria. In that role, she is also accredited to Angola, Botswana, Eswatini, Lesotho, Madagascar, Mauritius, Mozambique, Namibia and Zimbabwe. In October 2023, she met with Pravind Jugnauth, the Prime Minister of Mauritius, at the New Treasury Building in Port Louis.

== Personal life ==
Königsbrun is married to Gerald Schweighofer, and has two children.

Diplomatic posts
Preceded by Johann Brieger	Austrian Ambassador to South Africa; 2022–Present	Incumbent
