= Walter Koch (politician) =

German diplomat, lawyer and politician

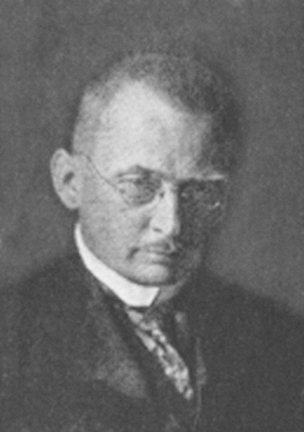
Walter Koch

Walter Franz Koch (18 May 1870 – 26 December 1947) was a Saxon and German diplomat, lawyer and politician for the liberal German People's Party, who served as Saxon Minister of State for the Interior, Saxon Ambassador to Prague and Berlin, and finally as German Ambassador to Prague.

== Career ==
Born in Chemnitz in the Kingdom of Saxony, he studied law in Lausanne, Berlin and Leipzig from 1889 to 1892, and served in the judiciary of the Kingdom of Saxony from 1893 to 1895. From 1896 to 1897 he was a junior lawyer with the Leipzig Police Directorate. From 1897 to 1809 he was city clerk, bank director and councillor of the city of Dresden. From 1909 to 1918 he was a legal adviser in the Ministry of the Interior of the Kingdom of Saxony. He was promoted to director-general (Ministerialdirektor) in the ministry in 1916. From 18 October 1918 to 14 November 1918 he served as the Minister of the Interior of Saxony, which was transformed from a kingdom into a republic during his tenure.

He was a member of the Saxon Parliament from 25 February to 6 October 1919. From 1919 to 1921 he was the Special Representative (Ambassador) of Saxony in Prague, and then the Saxon Ambassador to Berlin, representing the Saxon Government vis-à-vis the Prussian and federal government.

Koch joined the diplomatic service of the German federal government in 1921 when he was appointed as the German Ambassador to Prague, and remained in the post until 1935.

Koch married Hedwig Louise Eleonore Kostersitz von Marenhorst, the daughter of Field Marshal Karl Kostersitz von Marenhorst (né Kostersitz) and Leopoldine Vidasý. His wife was of Bohemian, Moravian and Hungarian descent. In September 1927 in the Church of Saint Nicholas, their daughter Elisabeth Helene was married to the Austrian Consul-General in Prague Herbert, Count of Schallenberg. Koch is a great-grandfather of the Chancellor of Austria, Alexander Schallenberg.
