= Christoph von Wydenbruck =

Austrian diplomat (1856–1917)

Christoph von Wydenbruck Count of Wydenbruck-Loë

Austro-Hungarian Ambassador to Spain
- In office 1911–1913
- Monarch: Franz Joseph I
- Preceded by: Rudolf von Welserheimb
- Succeeded by: Hans von Wagner (as Envoy)

Austro-Hungarian Ambassador to the Netherlands
- In office 1908–1911
- Monarch: Franz Joseph I
- Preceded by: Otto zu Brandis
- Succeeded by: Karl von Giskra

Austro-Hungarian Ambassador to Denmark
- In office 1889–1907
- Monarch: Franz Joseph I
- Preceded by: Konstantin von Trauttenberg
- Succeeded by: Iván von Rubido-Zichy (as Charge d'Affaires)

Personal details
- Born: 5 February 1856 Vienna, Austria
- Died: 4 October 1917 (aged 61) Reichenhall, Upper Bavaria
- Spouse: Countess Marie Fugger von Babenhausen (m. 1880; died 1917)
- Relations: Hermynia Zur Mühlen (niece); Georg, 6th Prince Fugger von Babenhausen (nephew)
- Parent(s): Ferdinand von Wydenbruck; Isabella Blacker

Count Christoph Anton Maria von Wydenbruck (5 February 1856 – 4 October 1917) was an Austrian diplomat.

== Early life ==
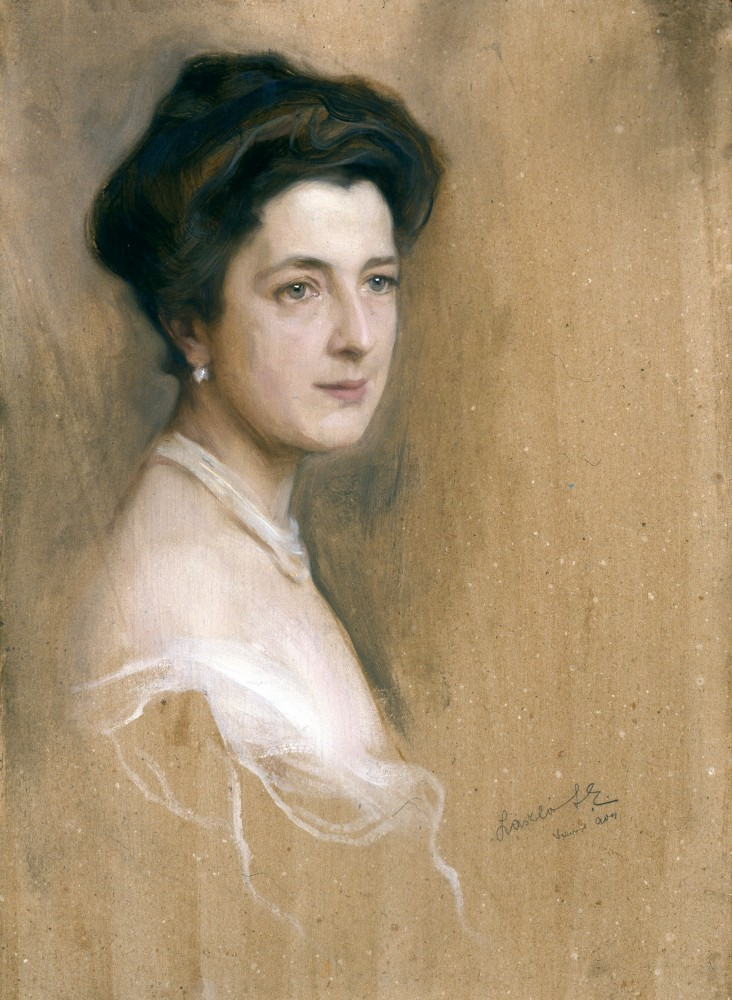
Study for a portrait of his sister-in-law, Countess Maria Esterházy, by Philip de László

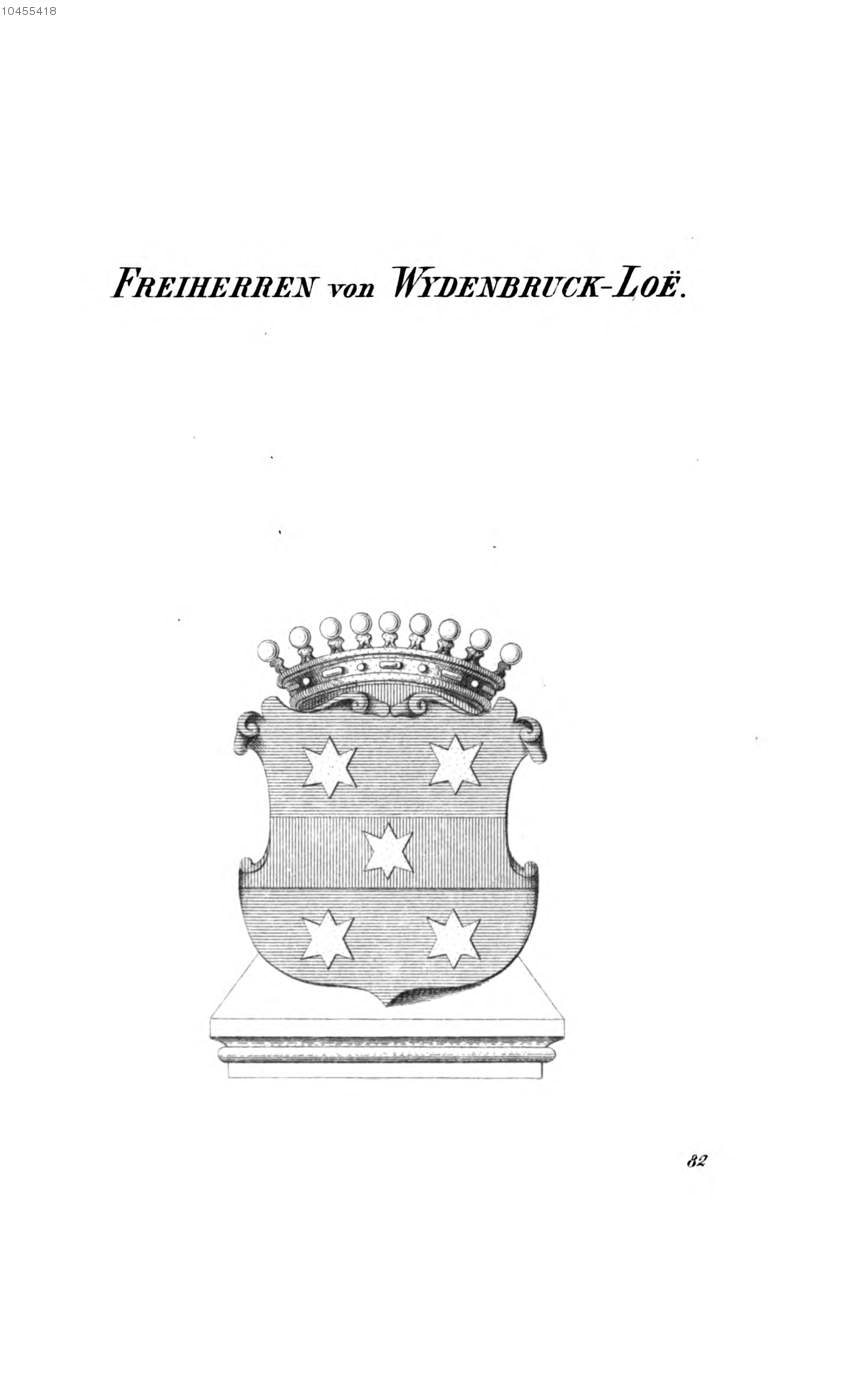
Coat of arms of the Counts of Wydenbruck-Loë

Count von Wydenbruck was born on 5 February 1856 in Vienna, Austria. He was the eldest son of diplomat Count Ferdinand von Wydenbruck and Isabella (née Blacker). Among his siblings were Count August von Wydenbruck (who married Countess Maria Esterházy de Galántha) and Countess Isabella von Wydenbruck (who married Count Folliot de Crenneville-Poutet, parents of writer Hermynia Zur Mühlen).

His paternal grandparents were Baron Franz von Wydenbruck-Loë and Alexandrina Arrazola de Oñate. His maternal grandparents were Lt.-Col. St John Blacker, a member of the Anglo-Irish gentry, and Anne Hammond Morgan (only child of Sir Thomas Charles Morgan). After his grandfather's death in 1842, his grandmother married Hon. George Augustus Browne (a younger son of the 2nd Barone Kilmaine).

While his father was the Austro-Hungarian Envoy in Washington, D.C., from 1865 to 1867, Wydenbruck attended school in the United States.

== Career ==
During the reign of Emperor Franz Joseph I, he served as an Austro-Hungarian diplomat. After serving in minor positions in London, he was appointed Austro-Hungarian Ambassador to Japan, then from 1889 to 1907 he was the Ambassador to Denmark, followed by Ambassador to the Netherlands from 1908 to 1911, and Ambassador to Spain from 1911 to 1913.

== Personal life ==
On 25 July 1880 at Meiselberg Castle, Count von Wydenbruck married Countess Marie Franziska Fugger von Babenhausen (b. 1858), only daughter of Countess Friederike von Christalnigg von und zu Gillitzstein and Karl, 4th Prince Fugger von Babenhausen. Her brother, Karl, 5th Prince Fugger von Babenhausen, was married to Princess Eleonora of Hohenlohe-Bartenstein. Together, Christoph and Marie were the parents of:

- Countess Eleonora Nora Frederika Agnes Augusta Maria von Wydenbruck (1894–1959), a writer who married artist Alfons Purtscher.
- Countess Helene Isabella von Wydenbruck (b. 1881), who married Count Nikolaus Desfours-Walderode.

Count von Wydenbruck died on 4 October 1917 at Reichenhall, a spa town in Upper Bavaria. In 1919, his widow acquired Meiselberg Castle from her mother's family. It passed to their daughter, Helene, Countess Desfours. In 1941, Helene left it to her cousin, Maria Theresia Fugger von Babenhausen (wife of Prince Heinrich von Hanau-Horowitz, a grandson of Frederick William, Elector of Hesse).
