= List of ambassadors of Austria to Spain =

Ambassadors of Austria to Spain

Ambassador of the Republic of Austria to the Kingdom of Spain
- Coat of arms of Austria
- Incumbent; Christian Ebner since 2018
- Ministry of Foreign Affairs; Embassy of Austria, Madrid
- Style: His Excellency
- Website: Austrian Embassy, Spain

The Ambassador of the Republic of Austria to Spain is the Republic of Austria's foremost diplomatic representative in the Kingdom of Spain. As head of Austria's diplomatic mission there, the ambassador is the official representative of the president and government of Austria to the Prime Minister and the government of Spain. The position has the rank and status of an Ambassador Extraordinary and Minister Plenipotentiary and the embassy is located in Madrid.

== History ==
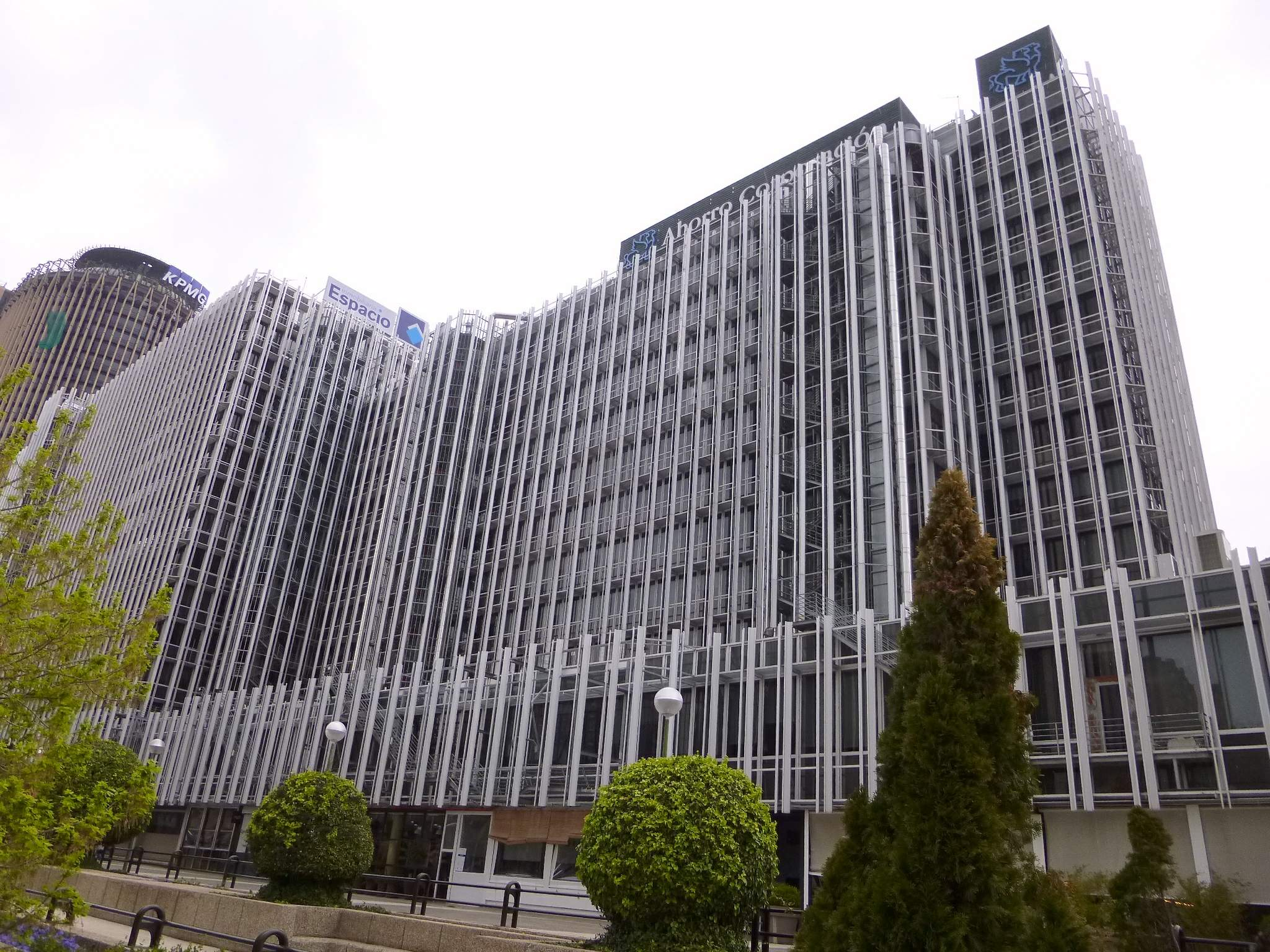
Embassy of Austria, Madrid

From 1580 to 1640, the Kingdom of Spain was ruled in personal union with the Kingdom of Portugal by the Philip dynasty (Philip II, Philip III and Philip IV) and, until 1700, by the Spanish line of the House of Habsburg.

In 1720, Charles VI and Philip V recognized the Bourbon dynasty as rulers of Spain. In 1869, Franz Joseph I recognized the government of Marshal Francisco Serrano Domínguez and that of Amadeo I. In 1871, Franz Joseph I recognized the government of Francisco Serrano Domínguez. In 1874, Franz Joseph I recognized the government of Alfonso XII, who restored the Bourbon dynasty.

From 1918, the official residence of the Austrian ambassador was at Calle de Fortuny, from 1968 at Calle Núñez de Balboa and is currently located at Paseo de la Castellana in Madrid.

== Heads of Mission ==
=== Habsburg Ambassadors (until 1804) ===
Appointed / Accredited	Name	Title / Notes	Appointed during	Accredited during	Left post
1563	Adam von Dietrichstein		Ferdinand I	Philip II	1570
1572	Hans Graf Khevenhüller-Frankenburg		Maximilian II	Philip II	1606
1609	Franz Christoph von Khevenhüller	Nephew of Hans	Rudolf II	Matthias	1623
1683	Heinrich Franz von Mansfeld		Leopold I	Charles II	1690
1689	Karl Ernst von Waldstein		Leopold I	Charles II	1693
1697	Ferdinand Bonaventura I. von Harrach		Leopold I	Charles II	1698
1698	Aloys Thomas Raimund von Harrach	Son of Ferdinand	Leopold I	Charles II	1700
1700	Breakdown of relations		Leopold I	Philip V	1725
1725	Joseph Lothar von Königsegg-Rothenfels	Ambassador	Charles VI	Louis I	1730
1730	Johann Stolte	Envoy (a.k.a. Johann Philipp Stoltius)	Charles VI	Louis I	1734
1734	Breakdown of relations		Charles VI	Louis I	1751
1751	Georg Adam von Starhemberg	Ambassador	Maria Theresia	Ferdinand VI	1752
1752	Christoph Anton von Migazzi		Maria Theresia	Ferdinand VI	1756
1756	Franz Xaver Wolfgang von Orsini-Rosenberg		Maria Theresia	Ferdinand VI	1763
1763	Franz Xaver Wolfgang von Orsini-Rosenberg	Ambassador	Maria Theresia	Charles III	1765
1765	Adam von Lebzeltern	Envoy	Maria Theresia	Charles III	
1772	August Josef, Prince of Lobkowicz	Ambassador	Maria Theresia	Charles III	1776
1776	Peter von Giusti Pietro Paolo Giusti	Envoy	Maria Theresia	Charles III	
1776	Wenzel Anton Kaunitz	Ambassador	Maria Theresia	Charles III	1780
1780	Wenzel Anton Kaunitz	Ambassador	Joseph II	Charles III	1784
1784	Karl von Humburg	Envoy	Joseph II	Charles III	
1786	Johann Friedrich von Kageneck		Joseph II	Charles III	1800
1800	Karl Andreoli	Ambassador	Francis II	Charles IV	
1803	Emmerich von Eltz	Ambassador	Francis II	Charles IV	1805

=== Austrian Ambassadors (1804 to 1867) ===
Appointed / Accredited	Name	Title / Notes	Appointed during	Accredited during	Left post
1805	Karl Andreoli	Envoy	Francis II	Charles IV	1809
1806	Wilhelm von Genotte	Envoy	Francis II	Charles IV	1809
1809	Breakdown of relations		Francis II	Ferdinand VII	1814
1814	Wilhelm von Genotte	Envoy	Francis II	Ferdinand VII	1815
1815	Alois von Kaunitz-Rietberg-Questenberg	Ambassador	Francis II	Ferdinand VII	1817
1817	Johann von Provost	Envoy	Francis II	Ferdinand VII	1819
1819	Lazar von Brunetti	Envoy	Francis II	Ferdinand VII	1823
1834	Johann von Reymond	Envoy	Francis II	Isabella II	1836
1836	Vacant		Ferdinand I	Isabella II	1848
1848	Johann von Reymond	Envoy	Franz Joseph I	Isabella II	1849
1849	Georg von Esterházy		Franz Joseph I	Isabella II	1855
1855	Isfordnik von Kostnitz Gobert	Envoy	Franz Joseph I	Isabella II	
1856	Albert von Crivelli		Franz Joseph I	Isabella II	1867

=== Austro-Hungarian Ambassadors (1867 to 1918) ===
Appointed / Accredited	Name	Title / Notes	Appointed during	Accredited during	Left post
1867	Karl von Jäger	Envoy	Franz Joseph I	Isabella II	1868
1868	Eduard von Lago	Envoy	Franz Joseph I	Francisco Serrano	1869
1869	Ladislaus von Karnicki von Karnice		Franz Joseph I	Francisco Serrano	1871
1871	Boguslaw Chotek von Chotkow		Franz Joseph I	Amadeo I	1872
1872	Otto von Mayer von Gravenegg	Envoy	Franz Joseph I	Amadeo I	
1874	Emanuel von Ludolf		Franz Joseph I	Francisco Serrano	1882
1882	Viktor Dubský von Třebomyslice		Franz Joseph I	Alfonso XII	1888
1888	Viktor Dubský von Třebomyslice	Ambassador	Franz Joseph I	Alfonso XIII	1903
1903	Rudolf von Welserheimb	Ambassador	Franz Joseph I	Alfonso XIII	1911
1911	Christoph von Wydenbruck	Ambassador	Franz Joseph I	Alfonso XIII	1913
1913	Hans von Wagner	Envoy	Franz Joseph I	Alfonso XIII	
1913	Karl Emil Prinz zu Fürstenberg	Ambassador	Franz Joseph I	Alfonso XIII	1918

=== Austrian Ambassadors (since 1919) ===
Ambassador of the First Republic (1925 to 1938) and ambassador of the Second Republic (since 1956).

Appointed / Accredited	Name	Title / Notes	Appointed during	Accredited during	Left post
1925	Alfred Grünberger		Rudolf Ramek	Alfonso XIII	1932
1933	Otto Günther		Engelbert Dollfuß	Manuel Azaña	1938
1938	Breakdown of relations				1945
1956	Clemens Wildner		Julius Raab	Francisco Franco	1957
1958	Erich Filz		Julius Raab	Francisco Franco	
1961	Karl Gruber		Alfons Gorbach	Francisco Franco	1966
1966	Heinz Standenat		Josef Klaus	Francisco Franco	1968
1968	Wolfgang Höller		Josef Klaus	Francisco Franco	1974
1977	Gerald Hinteregger		Bruno Kreisky	Juan Carlos I	
1979	Wolfgang Schallenberg		Bruno Kreisky	Juan Carlos I	1981
1984	Gerhard Gmoser		Fred Sinowatz	Juan Carlos I	
1986	Otto Maschke		Franz Vranitzky	Juan Carlos I	1987
1991	Michael Fitz		Franz Vranitzky	Juan Carlos I	
1995	Richard Wotava		Franz Vranitzky	Juan Carlos I	1998
2011	Rudolf Lennkh		Werner Faymann	Juan Carlos I	2013
2014	Peter Huber		Werner Faymann	Juan Carlos I	2017
2018	Christian Ebner		Sebastian Kurz	Felipe VI	

== See also ==
- Foreign relations of Austria
- Foreign relations of Spain
