= List of ambassadors of Austria to the Organisation for Economic Co-operation and Development =

Austrian ambassadors to the OECD

The following is a list of Austrian ambassadors to the Organisation for Economic Co-operation and Development in Paris, France. The official title for the position is the Representative of Austria to the Organisation for Economic Cooperation and Development, with the rank of Ambassador. In the absence of an ambassador, the Deputy Permanent Representative assumes the role of interim Permanent Representative and heads the delegation as Chargé d'Affaires. The current ambassador has been Gerhard Jandl since 7 March 2022.

== Office holders ==
The following is a chronological list of those who have held the office:

No.	Image	Ambassador	Term Start	Term End	Notes
1		Carl Heinz Bobleter	1958	1964	Later served as State Secretary at the Foreign Ministry.
2		Arno Halusa	1964	1968	Later served as Austrian Ambassador to the United States, Secretary General of the Federation of Austrian Industries.
3		Carl Heinz Bobleter	1968	1978	Second term
4		Peter Jankowitsch	1978	1983	Ambassador to Senegal, Cabinet Chief in Kreisky's 1st Cabinet, Ambassador to the UN and Chairman of the UN Security Council, President of the UN Office for Outer Space Affairs; Foreign Minister, State Secretary for European Affairs in the Federal Chancellery, Secretary General of the Austrian-French Centre; President of the Austrian Space Agency.
5		Georg Lennkh	1983	1993	Served in Kreisky's 3rd and 4th Cabinet; General Director for Development Cooperation at the Foreign Ministry, EU mission in Burundi, Austrian special ambassador for Africa and EU special representative in Chad.
6		Peter Jankowitsch	1993	1998	Second term
7		Karl Schramek	1998	2003	Former Director of the Cultural Institute in Budapest, Disarmament Department at the Foreign Ministry, International Secretary of the SPÖ, Foreign Policy Advisor to the Federal Chancellor, Secretary General of the OECD; Austrian Ambassador to Syria. Head of Mission at NATO in Belgium since 2008.
8		Ulrich Stacher	2003	2008	Former Head of the Coordination Affairs Section at the Federal Chancellery, Coordination Commission for Information Technology at the Ministry of Public Services and Sport.
9		Wolfgang Petritsch	2008	2013	Former Ambassador to Serbia and EU Special Representative for Kosovo, UN High Representative for Bosnia and Herzegovina, Ambassador to the UN in Geneva.
10		Maria Elisabeth Stubits-Weidinger	2013	2018	Former Deputy Head of Cabinet of the Federal Chancellor and Office Manager of the State Secretary for Media and Government Coordination at the Federal Chancellery.
11		Thomas Schnöll	2018	2021	Former Press Officer of the Foreign Ministry, Ambassador to Albania, Consul General in Chicago, Head of the Western Balkans Department at the Foreign Ministry.
12		Gerhard Jandl	2022	Present	Former Head of the Balkans Department in the Foreign Ministry, Ambassador in Sarajevo, Ambassador in Belgrade, Director of Security Policy, Ambassador to the Council of Europe.

== See also ==
- Lists of ambassadors of Austria
