= List of ambassadors of Austria to Japan =

Ambassadors of Austria to Japan

Ambassador of the Republic of Austria to Japan
- Coat of arms of Austria
- Incumbent; Sigrid Berka since 2024
- Ministry of Foreign Affairs; Embassy of Austria, Tokyo
- Style: Her Excellency
- Website: Austrian Embassy, Tokyo

The Ambassador of the Republic of Austria to Japan is the Republic of Austria's foremost diplomatic representative in Japan. As head of Austria's diplomatic mission there, the ambassador is the official representative of the president and government of Austria to the Prime Minister and the government of Japan. The position has the rank and status of an Ambassador Extraordinary and Minister Plenipotentiary and the embassy is located in Tokyo.

== Embassy, Tokyo ==
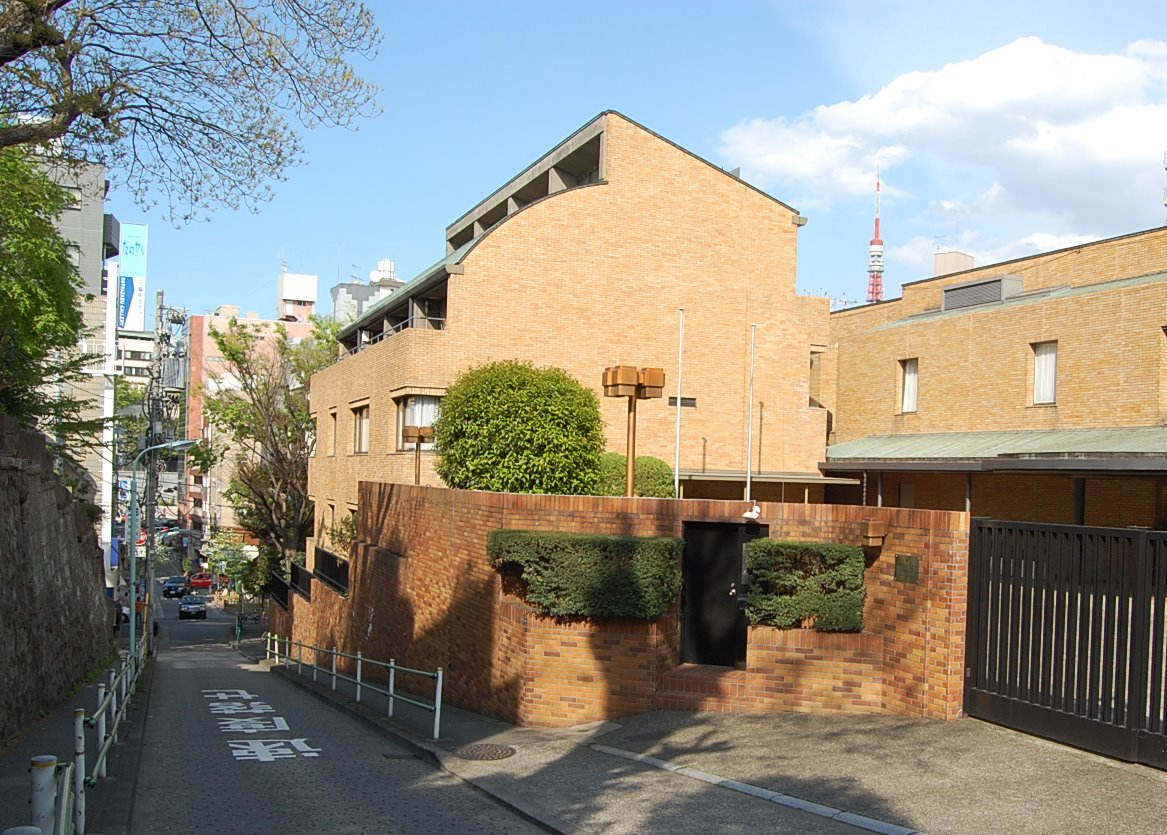
Austrian Embassy, Tokyo

The Austrian Embassy is in Moto Azabu, Minato-ku, Tokyo. In April 2024, Sigrid Berka was designated as the new Austrian Ambassador to Japan. She previously serves as the Ambassador to Slovenia.

== Austrian Ambassadors ==
| Appointed / Accredited | Name | Title / Notes | Appointed during | Accredited during | Left post |
|---|---|---|---|---|---|
| 1871 | Heinrich von Calice | Minister Resident | Franz Joseph I | Meiji oligarchy | 1874 |
| 1874 | Ignaz von Schaeffer | Minister Resident | Franz Joseph I | Meiji oligarchy | 1877 |
| 1874 | Karl von Boleslawsky | Chargé d'Affaires | Franz Joseph I | Meiji oligarchy | 1877 |
| 1874 | Maximilian Hoffer von Hoffenfels | Minister Resident | Franz Joseph I | Meiji oligarchy | 1879 |
| 1883 | Karl Załuski von Zaluskie | Envoy | Franz Joseph I | Meiji oligarchy | 1888 |
| 1888 | Rüdiger von Biegeleben | Envoy | Franz Joseph I | Kuroda Kiyotaka | 1893 |
| 1888 | Heinrich von Coudenhove | Chargé d'Affaires | Franz Joseph I | Kuroda Kiyotaka | 1893 |
| 1895 | Christoph von Wydenbruch | Envoy | Franz Joseph I | Itō Hirobumi | 1899 |
| 1899 | Adalbert Ambró von Adamócz | Ambassador | Franz Joseph I | Itō Hirobumi | 1908 |
| 1899 | Julius Szilassy von Szilos | Chargé d'Affaires | Franz Joseph I | Itō Hirobumi | 1908 |
| 1909 | Guido von Call | Ambassador | Franz Joseph I | Katsura Tarō | 1911 |
| 1912 | Ladislaus Müller von Szentgyörgy | Ambassador | Franz Joseph I | Katsura Tarō | 1914 |
| 1914 | Breaking off diplomatic relations by Austria-Hungary | | Franz Joseph I | Ōkuma Shigenobu | |
| 1920 | Bruno Müller | Honorary Consul | Michael Mayr | Hara Takashi | 1925 |
| 1926 | Ernst Störi | Honorary Consul General | Ignaz Seipel | Wakatsuki Reijirō | 1937 |
| 1953 | Resumption of diplomatic relations | | Julius Raab | Yoshida Shigeru | |
| 1955 | Franz Helmut Leitner | Envoy (1955–1957); Ambassador (1957–1960) | Julius Raab | Hatoyama Ichirō | 1960 |
| 1961 | Friedrich Hartlmayr | Ambassador | Alfons Gorbach | Ikeda Hayato | 1966 |
| 1967 | Otto Eiselsberg | Ambassador | Josef Klaus | Satō Eisaku | 1971 |
| 1971 | Reginald Thomas | Ambassador | Bruno Kreisky | Satō Eisaku | 1975 |
| 1976 | Franz Weidinger | Ambassador | Bruno Kreisky | Fukuda Takeo | 1980 |
| 1980 | Clemens Weichs an der Glon | Ambassador | Bruno Kreisky | Suzuki Zenkō | 1982 |
| 1983 | Georg Hennig | Ambassador | Fred Sinowatz | Nakasone Yasuhiro | 1986 |
| 1987 | Michael Fitz | Ambassador | Fred Sinowatz | Takeshita Noboru | 1990 |
| 1991 | Erich Maximilian Schmid | Ambassador | Franz Vranitzky | Miyazawa Kiichi | 1994 |
| 1995 | Martin Vukovich | Ambassador | Franz Vranitzky | Murayama Tomiichi | 1999 |
| 1999 | Hans-Dietmar Schweisgut | Ambassador | Viktor Klima | Obuchi Keizō | 2003 |
| 2003 | Peter Moser | Ambassador | Wolfgang Schüssel | Junichiro Koizumi | 2006 |
| 2007 | Jutta Stefan-Bastl | Ambassador | Alfred Gusenbauer | Fukuda Yasuo | 2012 |
| 2012 | Bernhard Zimburg | Ambassador | Werner Faymann | Noda Yoshihiko | 2016 |
| 2016 | Hubert Heiss | Ambassador | Christian Kern | Shinzō Abe | 2020 |
| 2020 | Elisabeth Bertagnoli | Ambassador | Sebastian Kurz | Shinzō Abe | 2024 |
| 2024 | Sigrid Berka | Ambassador | Karl Nehammer | Fumio Kishida | |

== See also ==
- Foreign relations of Austria
- Foreign relations of Japan
