= Yuri Standenat =

Yuri Wolfgang Standenat (born 1940) is a former Austrian diplomat.

== Early life ==
Yuri Standenat is the son of Inge Kichniawy and Heinz Standenat, who served as Austrian Ambassador to Egypt, Spain, and Russia.

In 1960 he graduated from the Lycée Français de Vienne, studied law, received a doctorate in law and entered the foreign service.

== Career ==
In 1975 he was sent to Dakar under Ambassador Udo Ehrlich-Adám as embassy secretary first class. In 1977 he was promoted to legation counselor first class and sent to the mission in Kinshasa, Zaire.

From 1981 to 1986 he served as Counsellor at the Embassy in Mexico, where he was consecutively accredited to the governments of Costa Rica, Honduras and Nicaragua. From 1994 to 1999, he was Ambassador in Havana.

From 2000 to 2005 he was ambassador in Buenos Aires and was also accredited to the government of Paraguay.

Standenat was retired in 2005 and inducted into the Order of the Liberator General San Martín on 25 September 2006.

== See also ==
- List of diplomatic missions of Austria

Diplomatic posts
| Preceded by Christoph Parisini | Austrian Ambassador to Cuba; 1994–1999 | Succeeded by Helga Konrad |
| Preceded by Wolfgang Kriechbaum | Austrian Ambassador to Argentina; 2000–2005 | Succeeded by Gudrun Graf |
