= List of ambassadors of Austria to Mexico =

Ambassadors of Austria to Mexico

Ambassador of the Republic of Austria to Mexico
- Coat of arms of Austria
- Incumbent; Elisabeth Kehrer since 2021
- Ministry of Foreign Affairs; Embassy of Austria, Mexico City
- Style: Her Excellency

The Ambassador of the Republic of Austria to Mexico is the Republic of Austria's foremost diplomatic representative in Mexico. As head of Austria's diplomatic mission there, the ambassador is the official representative of the president and government of Austria to the President and the Federal government of Mexico. The position has the rank and status of an Ambassador Extraordinary and Minister Plenipotentiary and the embassy is located in Mexico City.

== History ==
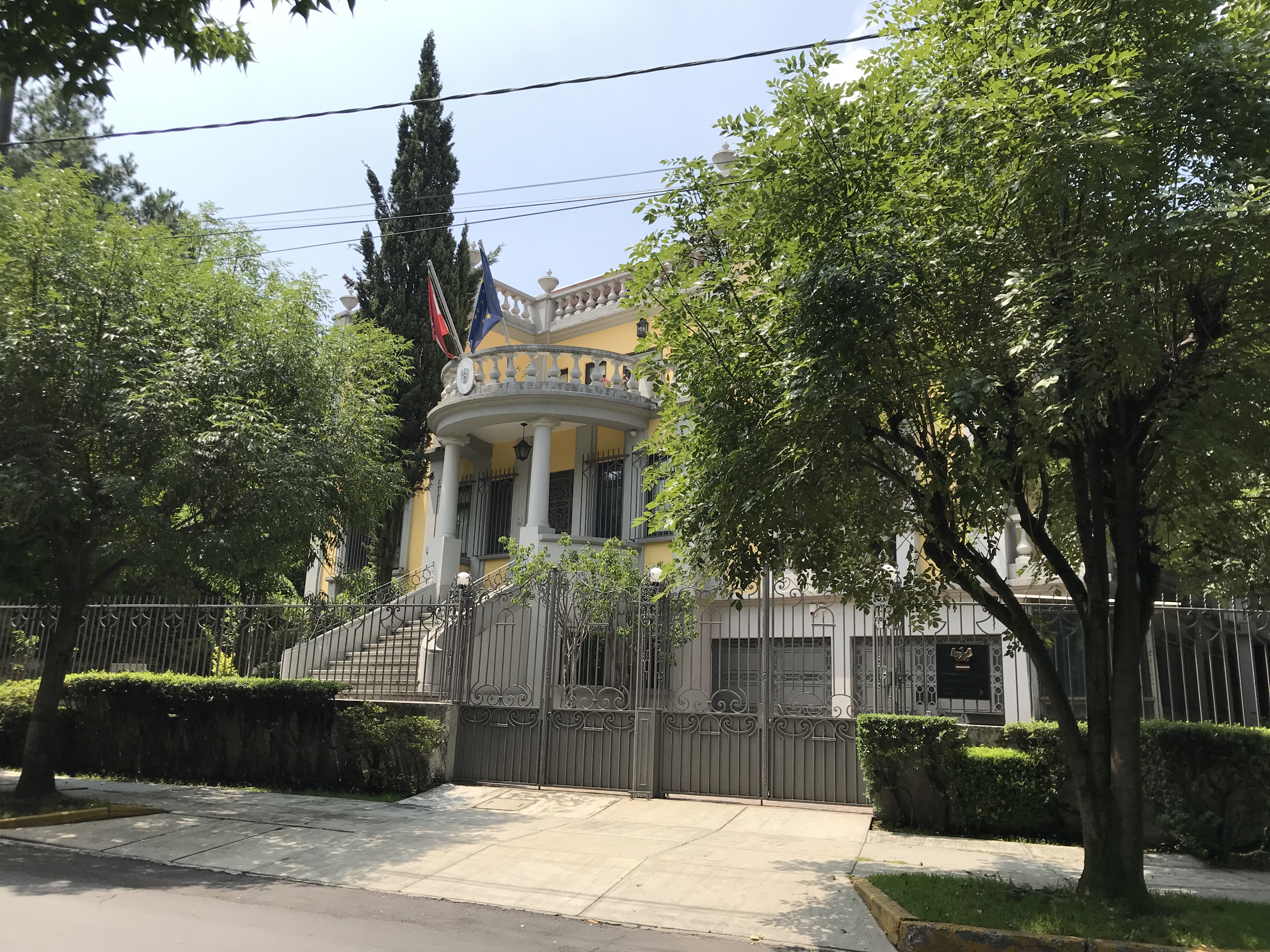
Embassy of Austria in Mexico City, 2019

The governments of Antonio López de Santa Anna and Emperor Ferdinand I recognized each other in 1842. On 10 April 1864, Archduke Maximilian, the younger brother of Emperor Franz Joseph I of Austria, accepted the imperial crown offered to him by Mexico. Franz Joseph I sent Guido von Thun und Hohenstein to Maximilian I and, thus, recognized his government. Maximilian's government was subsequently overthrown, and Maximilian himself was sentenced to death by court martial and executed in 1867. There were no diplomatic relations for more than 30 years.

Following an agreement between Austria-Hungary and Mexico on 23 March 1901, diplomatic relations were resumed.

During the Federal State dictatorship under Kurt Schuschnigg, there was only an embassy without an ambassador; with the "Anschluss" by Nazi Germany on 13 March 1938, the representation became obsolete. Mexico was then the only state in the world to officially condemn the annexation of Austria before the League of Nations; in 1956, Vienna named its Mexikoplatz in gratitude for this.

After the war, diplomatic relations were restored and the embassy was reoccupied in 1949. From the 1950s onwards, the ambassador to Mexico was also accredited to Cuba and the Central American republics (Costa Rica, El Salvador, Guatemala, Honduras, Nicaragua, and Panama).

=== Austrian Embassy, Mexico ===
The Austrian Embassy is now located at Sierra Tarahumara 420, colonia Lomas de Chapultepec district. The embassy also houses the Mexican Cultural Forum.

In addition to the embassy, there are four consular representations (honorary consulates) of Austria in Mexico: Cancún, Guadalajara, Monterrey, and Tijuana. The consulate in Mérida is temporarily closed (as of January 2020).

== List of Austrian envoys and ambassadors ==
Appointment/ Accreditation	Name	Comments	Appointed by	Accredited by the government	Left post
3 September 1864	Guido von Thun und Hohenstein	1868–1869 Ambassador to Prussia (Note: 1823; † 1904, from 3 July 1868 to 13 December 1869 Imperial and Royal Ambassador to Prussia.)	Franz Joseph I (Austrian Empire)	Maximilian I	1866
1 January 1867	Eduard von Lago (Note: Eduard von Lago (1823))	Chargé d'Affaires (Note: The envoy Guido Thun-Hohenstein was on leave due to illness.)	Franz Joseph I (Austria-Hungary)	Maximilian I	18 June 1867
18 June 1901	Gilbert von Hohenwart zu Gerlachstein (Note: 1854)		Franz Joseph I (Austria-Hungary)	Porfirio Díaz	10 September 1905
23 October 1906	Karl von Giskra	1906 / 1907 also ambassador to Chile; 1909 ambassador to Bulgaria	Franz Joseph I (Austria-Hungary)	Porfirio Díaz	21 March 1909
21 March 1909	Maximilian Hadik von Futak		Franz Joseph I (Austria-Hungary)	Francisco León de la Barra	30 June 1911
30 June 1911	Franz Riedl von Riedenau	Franz Joseph I (Austria-Hungary)		Victoriano Huerta	1 October 1913
15 October 1913	Koloman von Kánya	Official residence was 2a Calle de Orizaba 42; 1925–1933 Hungarian ambassador in Berlin, from 1933 Hungarian Foreign Minister	Franz Joseph I	Victoriano Huerta	11 November 1918
13 May 1930	Edgar Leo Gustav Prochnik	Chargé d'Affaires, simultaneously accredited to the United States	Wilhelm Miklas	Pascual Ortiz Rubio	13 March 1938 ("Anschluss" by Nazi Germany)
1949	Wolfgang Höller	from 1951 onwards at the Trade Mission to Mexico	Karl Renner	Miguel Alemán Valdés	1955
1955	Rudolf Baumann		Theodor Körner	Adolfo Ruiz Cortines	1961
7 June 1961	Erich Filz		Adolf Schärf	Adolfo López Mateos	11 February 1966
15 February 1966	Hans Thalberg		Franz Jonas	Gustavo Díaz Ordaz	8 November 1971
2 October 1972	Eugen Buresch		Franz Jonas	Luis Echeverría Álvarez	27 August 1977
1977	Alfred Missong jun.		Rudolf Kirchschläger		1982
26 February 1982	Heimo Kellner		Rudolf Kirchschläger	Miguel de la Madrid Hurtado	1987
1988	Klaus Daublebsky		Kurt Waldheim		1994
1994	Kurt Hengl		Thomas Klestil		1997
1997	Helga Winkler-Campagna		Thomas Klestil		2000
2001	Rudolf Lennkh		Thomas Klestil	Vicente Fox Quesada	2005
2005	Johannes Druml (Note: 9 May 1951.)		Heinz Fischer		2009
2009	Alfred Längle		Heinz Fischer	Felipe Calderón Hinojosa	2014
14 February 2014	Eva Hager		Heinz Fischer	Enrique Peña Nieto	2017
November 2017	Franz Josef Kuglitsch		Alexander Van der Bellen	Enrique Peña Nieto	2021
February 2021	Elisabeth Kehrer		Alexander Van der Bellen	Andrés Manuel López Obrador	

== See also ==
- Foreign relations of Austria
- Foreign relations of Mexico
