= Eva Nowotny =

Austrian ambassador

Eva Nowotny (born 17 February 1944 in Vienna) is chair of the Board of the University of Vienna. She has been Austrian ambassador to France (1992–1997), to the Court of St. James's (United Kingdom) (1997–1999), and to the United States. From 1983 to 1992, Nowotny served as foreign policy advisor to the Austrian chancellors Fred Sinowatz and Franz Vranitzky. She was an assistant professor at the University of Vienna from 1969 to 1973. Eva Nowotny is married to Thomas Nowotny, a retired diplomat, author and lecturer on international relations. She is a member of the Advisory Council of Independent Diplomat. She has one daughter and two grandchildren.

On 25 January 2008 she rang the NASDAQ opening bell in celebration of the Viennese Opera Ball in New York.
