= Herbert, Count of Schallenberg =

Austrian diplomat (1901–1974)

Herbert Schallenberg
- Born: 29 March 1901; Vienna, Austro-Hungary
- Died: 26 March 1974 (aged 72)
- Occupation: Diplomat
- Children: Wolfgang Schallenberg

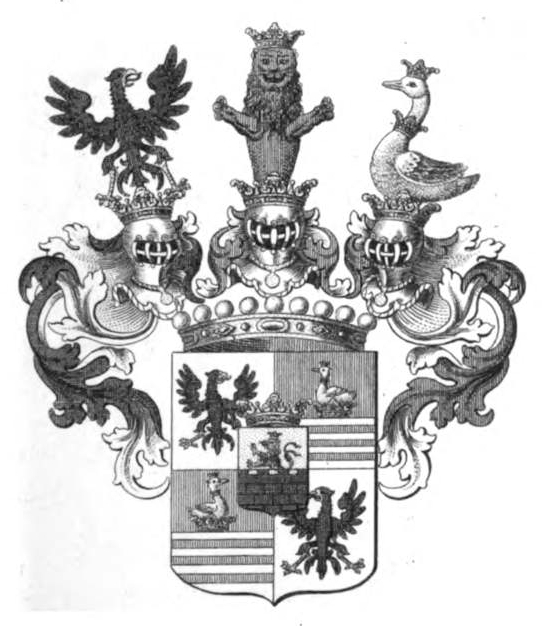
Coat of arms of the comital branch of the Schallenberg family

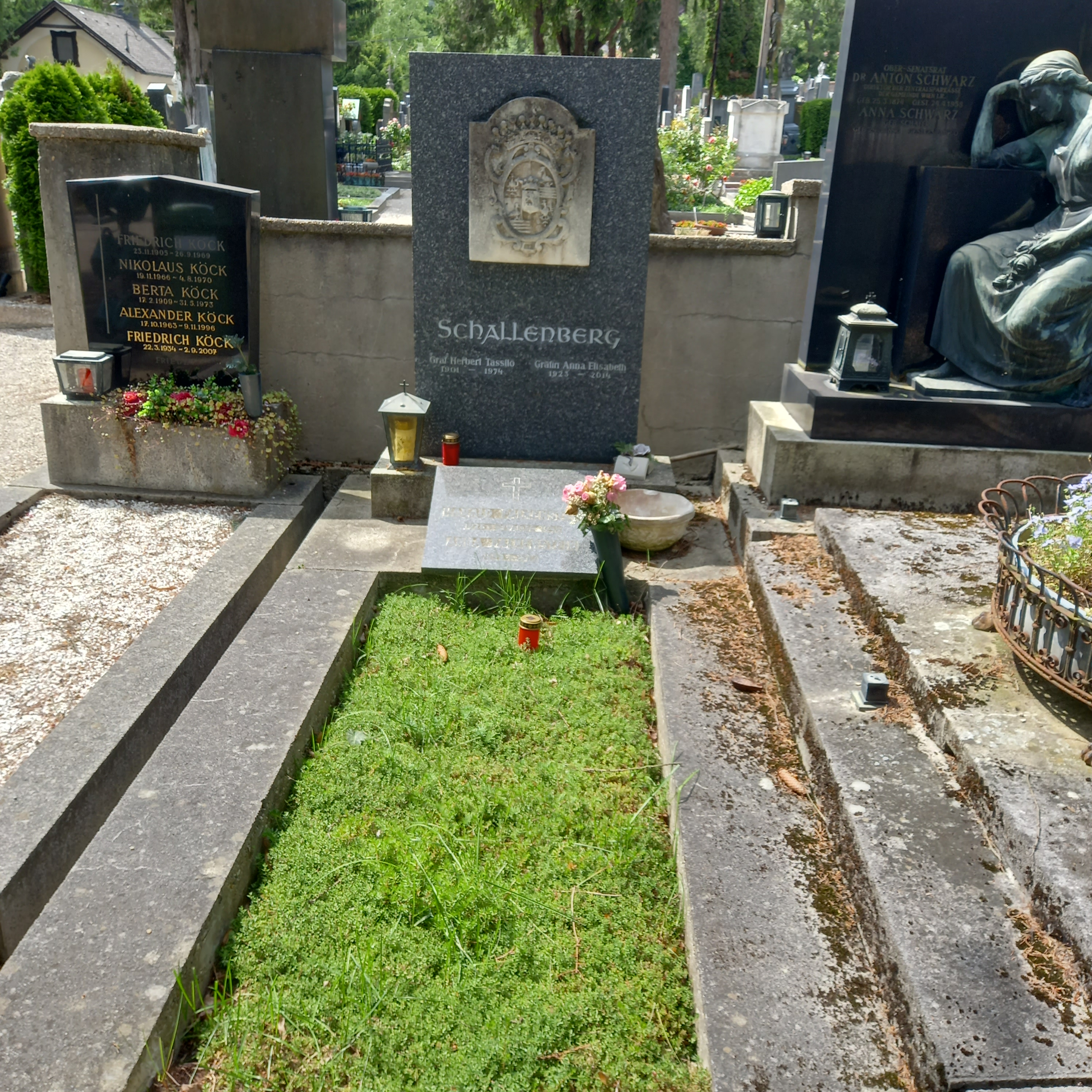
Tomb of Herbert, Count of Schallenberg and wife Anna at Weidling cemetery, Klosterneuburg

Count Herbert Erwin Joseph Anton von Schallenberg (German: Herbert Graf von Schallenberg; 29 March 1901 – 26 March 1974), officially known as Herbert Schallenberg from 1919, was an Austro-Hungarian count, lawyer, diplomat and industrialist. He was the Austrian consul-general in Prague in the 1930s.

He was born in Vienna as a member of the comital branch of the noble Austro-Hungarian Schallenberg family. In September 1927 in the Church of Saint Nicholas in Prague, he married Elisabeth Helene Koch, daughter of the German Ambassador to Prague Walter Koch.

He was the father of the diplomat Wolfgang Schallenberg and the grandfather of acting Chancellor of Austria, Alexander Schallenberg.
