= Schallenberg family =

Austro-Hungarian noble family

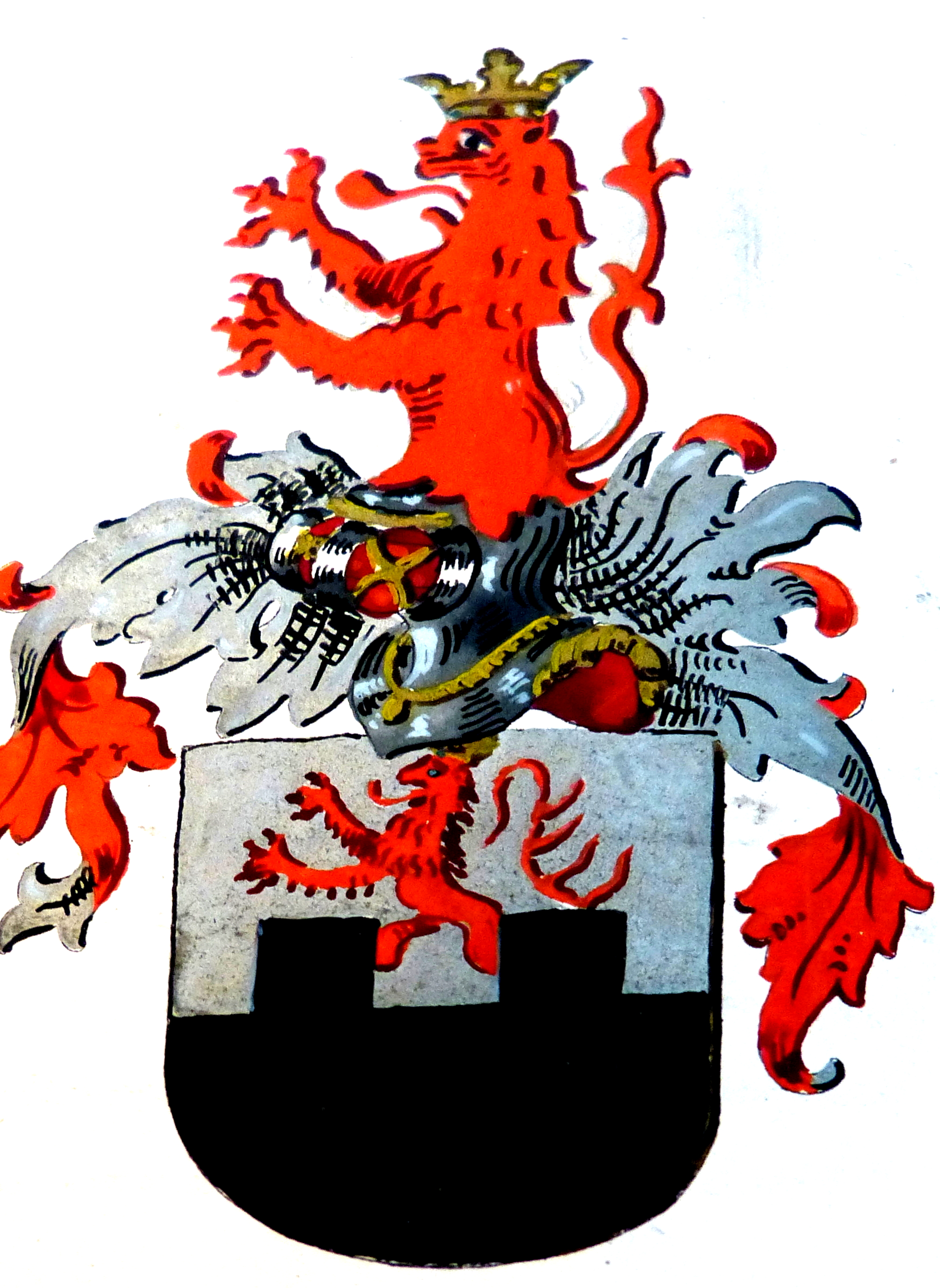
Coat of arms of Schallenberg family

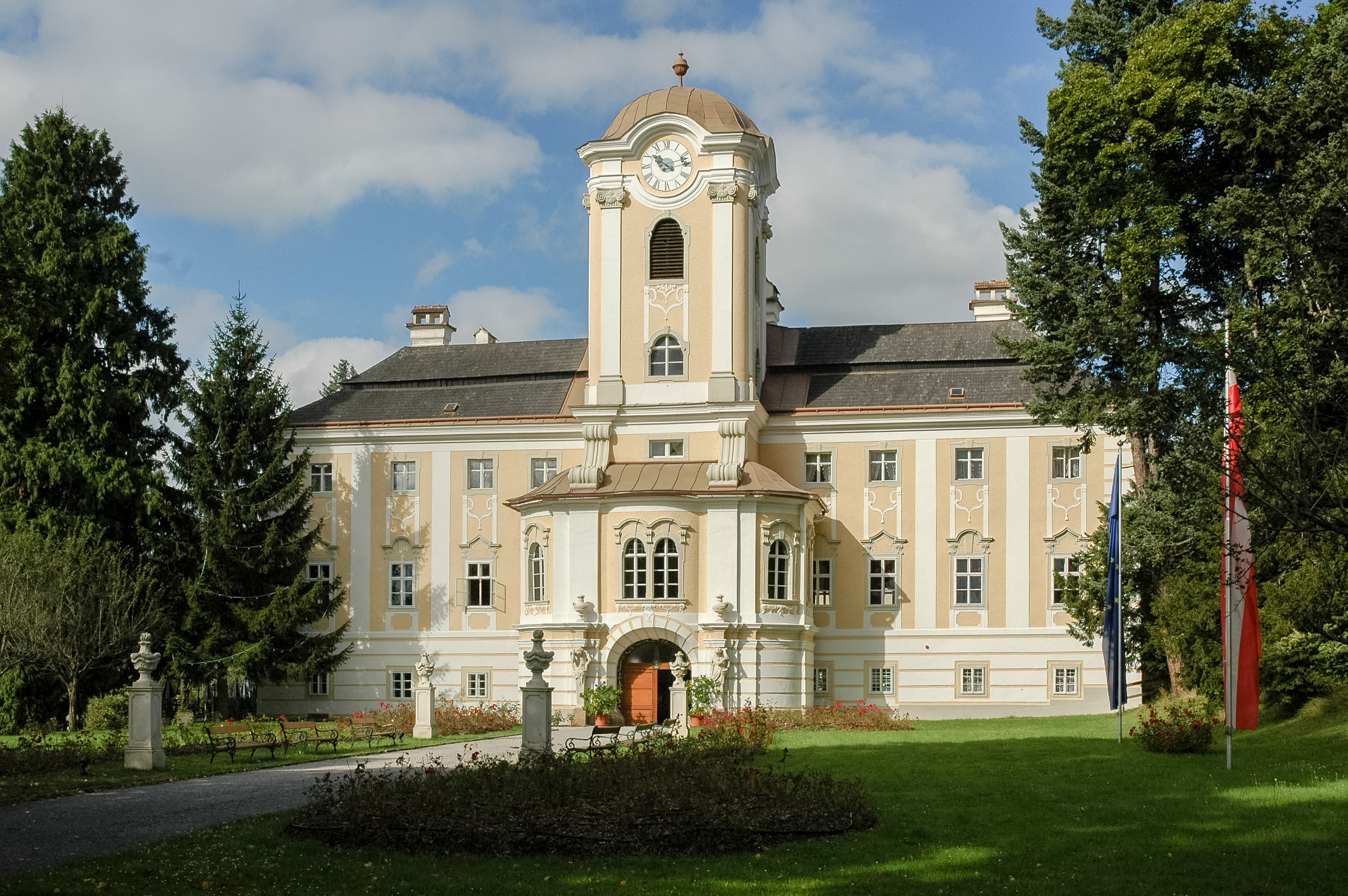
Rosenau castle

The House of Schallenberg is the name of an Austro-Hungarian noble family, whose members occupied many important political positions and were in diplomatic service.

== History ==
The family hails from Sankt Ulrich im Mühlkreis, where it is known since 1190. Heinricus de Schalinberc is mentioned in 1260, adopting the name after the Schallenberg Castle. In 1636 the Schallenbergs were raised to baronial rank and in 1666 they were raised to comital rank in the Habsburg Hereditary Lands. The family received the Hungarian Indigenat and were recognized as nobles of the Kingdom of Hungary by the Diet of Hungary in 1688. From 1720 to 1803 Rosenau castle was owned by the family.

== Notable members ==
- Christoph von Schallenberg (1561–1597), naval commander and humanist poet
- Leopold Christoph, Count of Schallenberg (1712–1800), Governor of Lower Austria
- Herbert, Count of Schallenberg (1901–1974), diplomat and industrialist
- Wolfgang Schallenberg (1930–2023), diplomat
- Alexander Schallenberg (b. 1969), Chancellor of Austria, foreign minister of Austria
