= List of ambassadors of Austria to Peru =

Ambassador of Austria to the Republic of Peru
- Coat of arms of Austria
- Incumbent; Gerhard Zettl since 2019
- Ministry of Foreign Affairs
- Inaugural holder: Wilhelm Brauns as Honorary Consul
- Formation: 1864

The Extraordinary and Plenipotentiary Ambassador of Austria to Peru is the official representative of the Republic of Austria to the Republic of Peru. The ambassador in Lima is also accredited to Bolivia.

== Background ==
Both countries established relations in the 19th century. In 1851, Austria-Hungary recognized the independence of Peru, and both countries subsequently established relations. By 1859, ethnic Germans from Austria and Germany established and founded the colony of Pozuzo.

As a result of World War I, Peru severed relations with both Germany and Austria-Hungary, reestablishing them with the First Austrian Republic after the war. After the incorporation of Austria into the German Reich in 1938, Peru ceased to have relations with Austria, instead continuing its relations with Germany until 1942. During this period, the Austrian population in Peru saw itself polarized between Austrian loyalists and National Socialists.

In 1947, Peru recognized the Republic of Austria, and in 1949, bilateral relations were resumed, being elevated to embassy level in 1968.

== List of representatives ==
Name	Term begin	Term end	Head of state	Notes
Representatives of the Monarchy of Austria (1864–1919)
Wilhelm Brauns	1864	1872	Franz Joseph I	First honorary consul and representative of the Austrian Monarchy (later Austria-Hungary) to Peru. His term began with the opening of the consulate on the same year.
Christian Krüger	1872	1883	Franz Joseph I	
Jean Louis Dubois	1883	1898	Franz Joseph I	
Graham Row	1898	1899	Franz Joseph I	
Samuel Brahms	1899	1908	Franz Joseph I	
Walter Justus	1908	1918	Franz Joseph I	The honorary consulate in Lima closed in 1919.
Representatives of the Republic of Austria (since 1922)
Adolf Kerschbaum	1922	1922	Karl Seitz	Honorary Consul. Died in office. The honorary consul's office remained empty from 1922 to 1926.
Franz Ludwig Ostern	1927	1938	Michael Hainisch	A dedicated National Socialist, he was criticized by opponents of the movement in Peru, who called for his removal. He was also accredited to the legation in Brazil.
Represented by Germany (Austria incorporated into Germany in 1938, diplomatic relations resumed in 1949)
Josef Kripp	1949	1953	Karl Renner	Accredited from the legation in Santiago, Chile since 1948. He delivered his credentials to then president Manuel A. Odría on November 2, 1949. Preparations for the opening of a Peruvian embassy in Vienna and an honorary consulate in Lima took place around the same time.
Karl Hudeczek	1953	1955	Theodor Körner	The legation in Santiago was elevated to an embassy in 1953. During this time, Alfred C. Buchner was named honorary consul in Lima, an office he held until his death in 1992. Buchner was succeeded by his daughter Elfriede Buchner, who ran the consulate until its closure in 2001.
Max Attems	1955	1958	Theodor Körner	Accredited from Santiago. Attems presented his credentials in Lima on September 12, 1955.
Paul Zedtwitz	1958	1962	Adolf Schärf	Accredited from Santiago. Zedtwitz presented his credentials in Lima on October 13, 1958.
Harald Gödel	1963	1968	Adolf Schärf	Accredited from Santiago.
Edmund Krahl	1968	1970	Franz Jonas	First resident ambassador in Lima after the establishment of an embassy.
Erich Maximilian Schmid	1971	1974	Franz Jonas	
Paul Zedtwitz	1974	1976	Bruno Kreisky	
Carl Rauscher	1977	1981	Rudolf Kirchschläger	
Rudolf Stangelberger	1981	1983	Rudolf Kirchschläger	
Udo Ehrlich-Adám	1983	1990	Rudolf Kirchschläger	
Franz Irbinger	1990	1993	Kurt Waldheim	
Arthur Schuschnigg	1994	1997	Thomas Klestil	He was one of the hostages during the Japanese embassy hostage crisis.
Wolfgang Donat	1997	2003	Thomas Klestil	
Gerhard Doujak	2003	2006	Thomas Klestil	
Georg Woutsas	2007	2009	Heinz Fischer	
Andreas Melán	2009	2014	Heinz Fischer	
Andreas Rendl	2014	2018	Heinz Fischer	
Gerhard Zettl	2019	Incumbent	Alexander Van der Bellen	

== See also ==
- List of ambassadors of Peru to Austria
