= List of ambassadors of Austria to the Netherlands =

Ambassadors of Austria to the Netherlands

Ambassador of the Republic of Austria to the Kingdom of the Netherlands
- Coat of arms of Austria
- Incumbent; Astrid Harz since 2020
- Ministry of Foreign Affairs; Embassy of Austria, The Hague
- Style: Her Excellency
- Website: Austrian Embassy, The Hague

The Ambassador of the Republic of Austria to the Netherlands is the Republic of Austria's foremost diplomatic representative in the Kingdom of the Netherlands. As head of Austria's diplomatic mission there, the ambassador is the official representative of the president and government of Austria to the Prime Minister and the government of the Netherlands. The position has the rank and status of an Ambassador Extraordinary and Minister Plenipotentiary and the embassy is located in The Hague.

== Heads of Mission ==
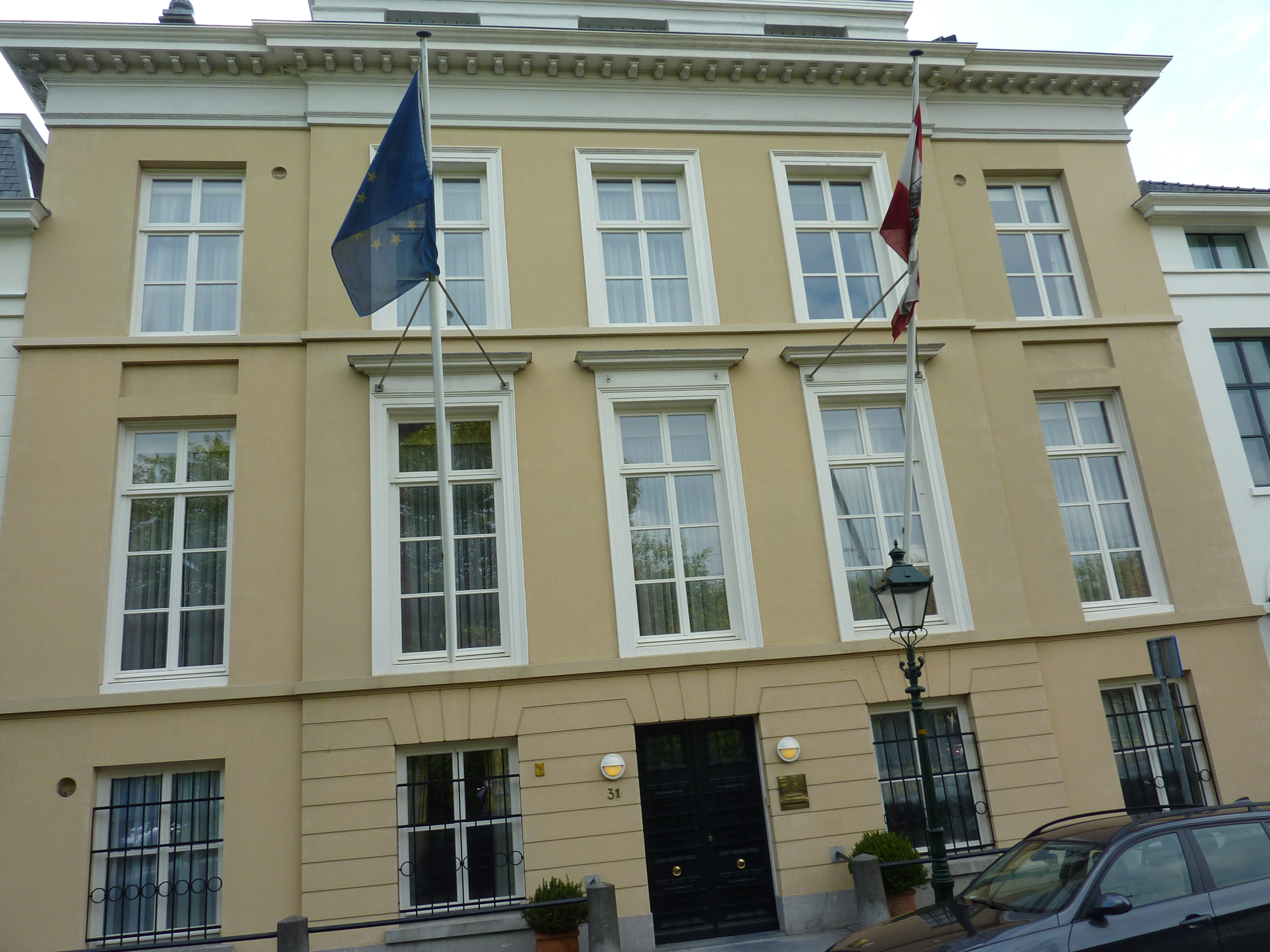
Austrian Embassy, Koninginnegracht, The Hague

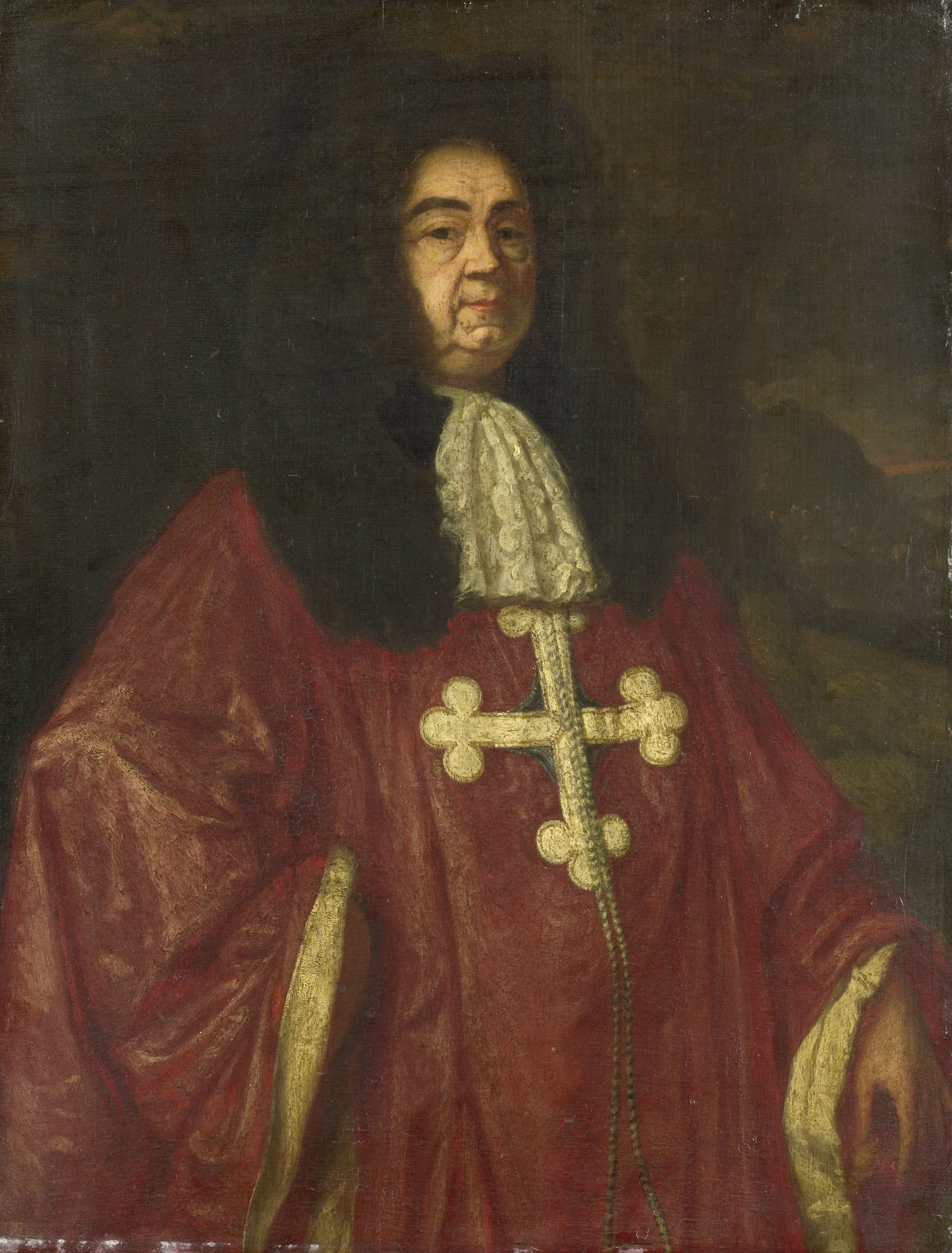
Portrait of Daniel Johannes Kramprich of Kronenfeld, by Simon Ruys, between 1679 and 1687

Appointed / Accredited	Name	Title / Notes	Appointed during	Accredited during	Left post
1658	Jean Friquet		Leopold I	Johan de Witt	1667
1667	Daniel Johannes Kramprich von Kronenfeld		Leopold I	Johan de Witt	1693
1693	Heinrich Johann Franz von Stratmann		Leopold I	William III	1696
1698	Leopold Wilhelm von Auersperg		Leopold I	William III	1707
1707 (auch: 1698)	Johann Peter von Goess		Leopold I	William III	1708
1707	Arnold von Heems		Joseph I	States General	1718
1709	Philipp Ludwig Wenzel von Sinzendorf	Extraordinary Representative	Joseph I	States General	1712
1711	Johann Wenzel von Gallas		Charles VI	States General	1714
1719	Leopold Johann Victorin von Windisch-Graetz		Charles VI	States General	1725
1721	Christoph Anton Siegmann		Charles VI	States General	1741
1725	Karl von Königsegg-Erbs		Charles VI	States General	1728
1728	Franz Wenzel von Sinzendorff		Charles VI	States General	1733
1733	Anton Corfiz Ulfeldt		Charles VI	States General	1739
1739	Andreas Johannes Halloy		Charles VI	States General	1725
1741	Thaddäus von Reischach		Maria Theresia	States General	1782
1748	Philipp Josef von Orsini-Rosenberg		Maria Theresia	States General	1748
1782	Franz von Reischach		Joseph II	William V	1786
1787	Karl von Merode Westerloo		Joseph II	William V	1790
1790	Johann Rudolf von Buol-Schauenstein	Chargé d'Affaires	Joseph II	William V	1791
1791	Ludwig von Starhemberg		Leopold II	William V	1793
1793	Bernhard von Pelser	Chargé d'Affaires of the Batavian Republic	Francis II	Batavian Republic	1795
1802	Wilhelm von Feltz	Kingdom of Holland	Francis II	Kingdom of Holland	1805
1806	Johann Baptist Provost	Chargé d'Affaires	Francis II	Louis Bonaparte	1808
1810	Wilhelm von Feltz		Francis II	Louis Bonaparte	1808
1808	Johann Baptist Provost	Chargé d'Affaires of the Netherlands	Francis II	Louis Bonaparte	1809
1814	Johann Baptist Provost	Chargé d'Affaires	Francis II	William I	1815
1815	Franz Binder von Krieglstein		Francis II	William I	1820
1820	Felix von Mier		Francis II	William I	1830
1830	Johann von Wessenberg		Francis II	William I	1835
1835	Johann Hieronymus von Allegri	Chargé d'Affaires	Ferdinand I	William I	1837
1837	Friedrich Christian Senfft von Pilsach		Ferdinand I	William I	1843
1843	Franz Sebastian Dominicus von Leykam	Chargé d'Affaires	Ferdinand I	William I	1845
1845	Moritz Esterházy de Galantha		Ferdinand I	William II	1848
1849	Anton von Doblhoff-Dier		Franz Joseph I.	Johan Rudolf Thorbecke	1858
1859	Ferdinand von Langenau		Franz Joseph I.	Jan Jacob Rochussen	1871
1872	Heinrich Karl von Haymerle		Franz Joseph I.	Gerrit de Vries	1877
1877	Rudolf von Mülinen		Franz Joseph I.	Joannes Kappeyne van de Coppello	1888
1888	Otto von Walterskirchen		Franz Joseph I.	Aeneas Mackay Jr.	1894
1894	Alexander Okolicsányi von Okolicsna		Franz Joseph I.	Joan Röell	1905
1905	Otto zu Brandis		Franz Joseph I.	Theo de Meester	1907
1908	Christoph von Wydenbruck		Franz Joseph I.	Theo Heemskerk	1911
1911	Karl von Giskra		Franz Joseph I.	Theo Heemskerk	1917
1917	Ludwig Széchényi von Sárvár und Felsövidék		Charles I	Pieter Cort van der Linden	1918
1919	Otto von Franz		Karl Renner	Charles Ruijs de Beerenbrouck	1920
1946	Robert Friedinger Pranter		Leopold Figl	Louis Beel	1950
1950	Rudolf Seemann		Leopold Figl	Willem Drees	1954
1954	Erich Filz		Julius Raab	Willem Drees	1955
1955	Carl Wildmann		Julius Raab	Willem Drees	1956
1956	Georg Afuhs		Julius Raab	Willem Drees	1964
1965	Claus Winterstein		Josef Klaus	Jo Cals	1968
1968	Johannes Coreth	Head of the Diplomatic Academy of Vienna (1977–1978)	Josef Klaus	Piet de Jong	1978
1999	Alexander Christiani		Viktor Klima	Wim Kok	2000
2004	Erwin Kubesch		Wolfgang Schüssel		2008
2008	Wolfgang Paul		Werner Faymann	Jan Peter Balkenende	2012
2012	Werner Druml		Werner Faymann	Mark Rutte	2016
2017	Heidemaria Gürer		Christian Kern	Mark Rutte	2020
2020	Astrid Harz		Sebastian Kurz	Mark Rutte	

== See also ==
- Foreign relations of Austria
- Foreign relations of the Netherlands
