= Schallenberg Castle =

Coordinates: 48.4703°N 13.9776°E

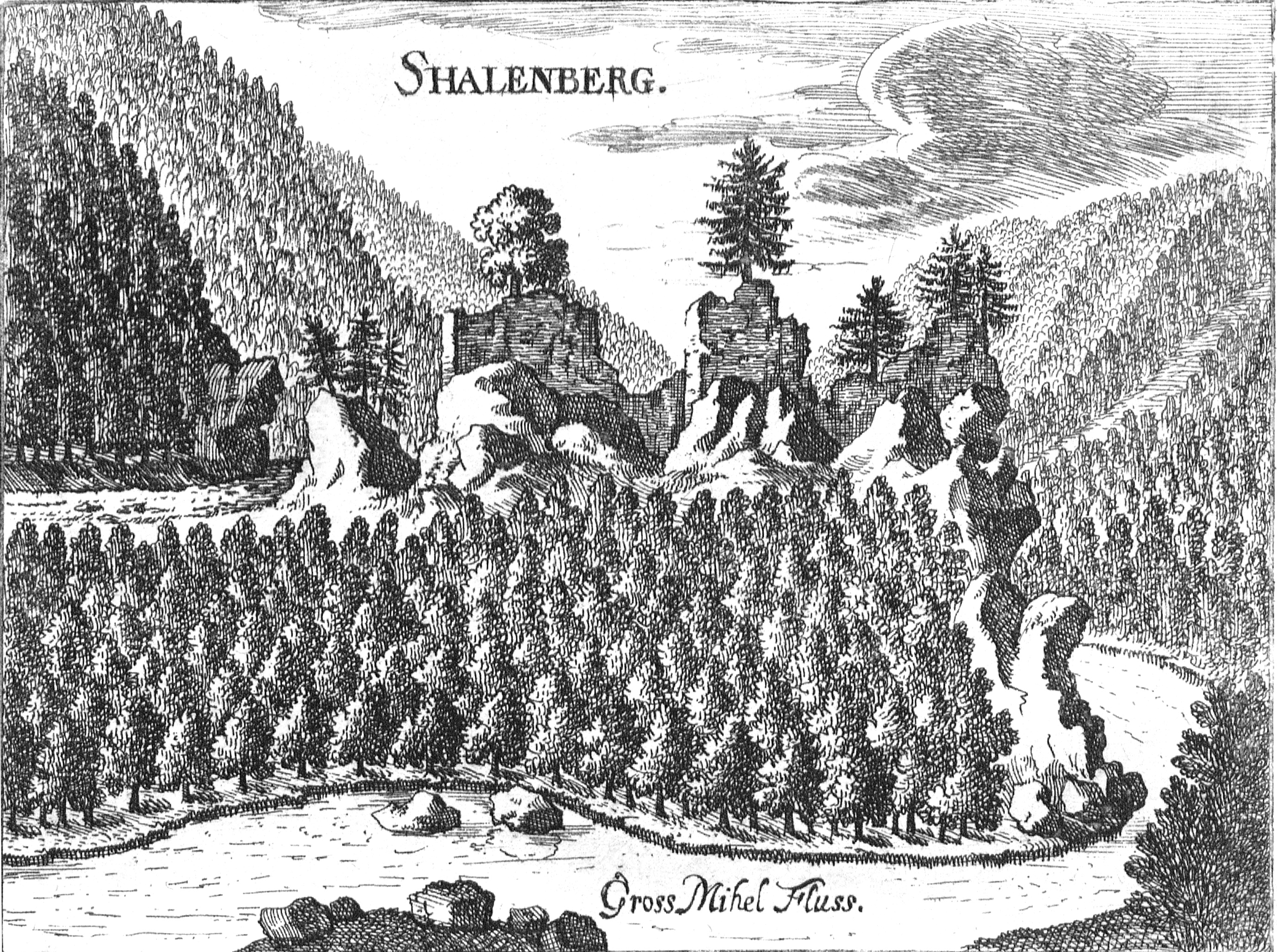
Schallenberg Castle in a 1674 engraving by Georg Matthäus Vischer

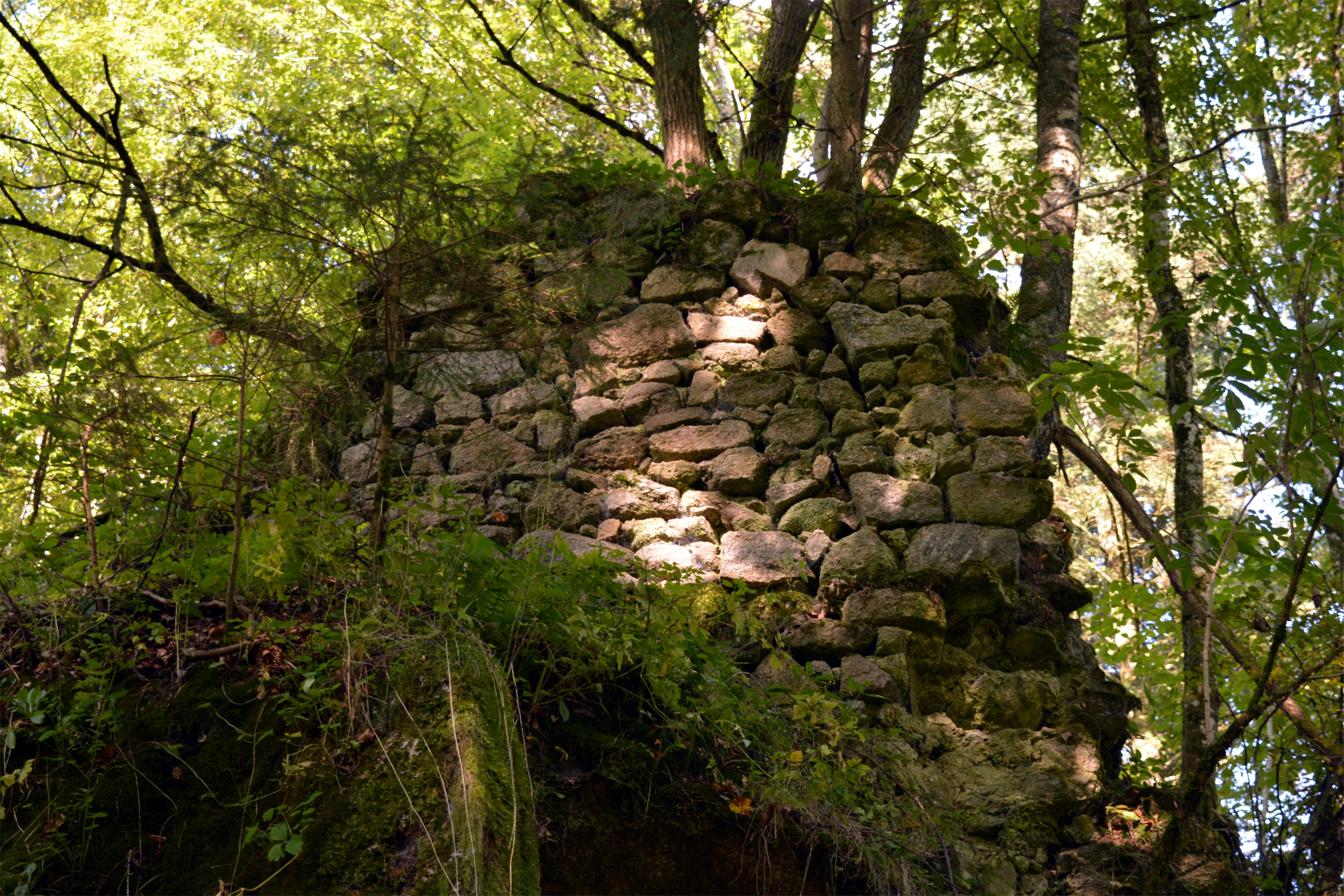
Ruins of the tower, 2017

Schallenberg Castle is a ruined hilltop castle in Kleinzell im Mühlkreis, Rohrbach District, Upper Austria.

The castle, likely built around 1231, is the namesake of the noble Schallenberg family, who took ownership of it in 1260. It was destroyed by Hussites in the mid-15th century, and has been returned to Schallenberg possession since 1982.
