= Alfred Missong jun. =

Austrian diplomat

Alfred Missong jun. (14 January 1934 – 23 January 2017 in Vienna), was an Austrian diplomat.

== Life ==
Alfred Missong is the son of the Austrian catholic publicist Alfred Missong.

== Diplomatic career ==
After working as a free correspondent in Eastern Europe for magazines from Sweden and Switzerland, he joined the diplomatic service of Austria. This profession lead him to Belgrade, Moscow, London and finally as an ambassador to Mexico City, Caracas and Lisbon. From 1986 to 1993 he was the headmaster of the Diplomatic Academy of Vienna. From 2000 to 2001, he led the OSCE Mission for Chechnya.

== Publications ==
- Christentum und Politik in Österreich (Christianity and Politics in Austria) together with his father Alfred Missong, Böhlan Verlag, 2006
