= Wolfgang Schallenberg =

Austrian diplomat (1930–2023)

Wolfgang Schallenberg gcYC
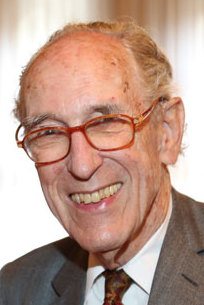
- Schallenberg in 2013
- Born: 3 June 1930; Prague, Czechoslovakia
- Died: 8 February 2023 (aged 92)
- Occupation: Diplomat
- Children: Alexander Schallenberg; Valérie Schallenberg (Bataille); Sophie Schallenberg
- Father: Herbert, Count of Schallenberg

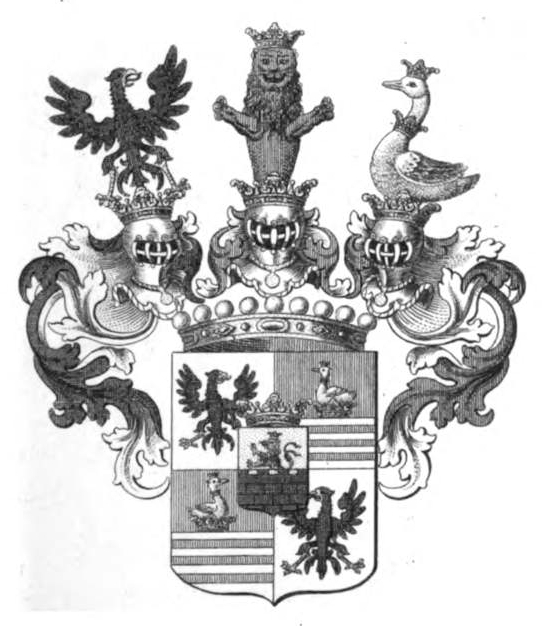
Coat of arms of the comital branch of the Schallenberg family

Wolfgang Schallenberg gcYC (3 June 1930 – 8 February 2023) was an Austrian diplomat. He was the Austrian ambassador to India (1974–1978), Spain (1979–1981), and France (1988–1992), and the Secretary General of the Ministry of Foreign Affairs (1992–1996).

A member of the comital branch of the noble Austro-Hungarian Schallenberg family, he was born in Prague as the son of the industrialist and diplomat Herbert, Count of Schallenberg (Herbert Graf von Schallenberg). He studied law at the University of Vienna as well as political science at French and British universities. In 1982, he was made a Knight Grand Cross of the Order of Isabella the Catholic (gcYC) by King Juan Carlos I of Spain.

His son, Alexander, was Minister of Foreign Affairs between 2019 and 2025, interrupted by a short stint as Chancellor in 2021. Wolfgang Schallenberg died on 8 February 2023, at the age of 92.
