= Franz Ceska =

Austrian diplomat (1936–2026)

Franz Ceska (31 January 1936 – February 2026) was an Austrian diplomat. He was the ambassador to Belgium from 1982 to 1988, permanent representative to the United Nations in Geneva from 1988 to 1991, secretary general of the Federation of Austrian Industry from 1992 to 1997, and ambassador to France from 1997 to 2001.

== Life and career ==
Ceska was born in Vienna on 31 January 1936. He studied law at the University of Vienna, earning a doctorate. He subsequently attended the College of Europe in Bruges from 1958 to 1959, and immediately afterwards joined the Foreign Ministry.

Ceska died in February 2026, at the age of 90.
