= Austrian Development Cooperation =

Government program

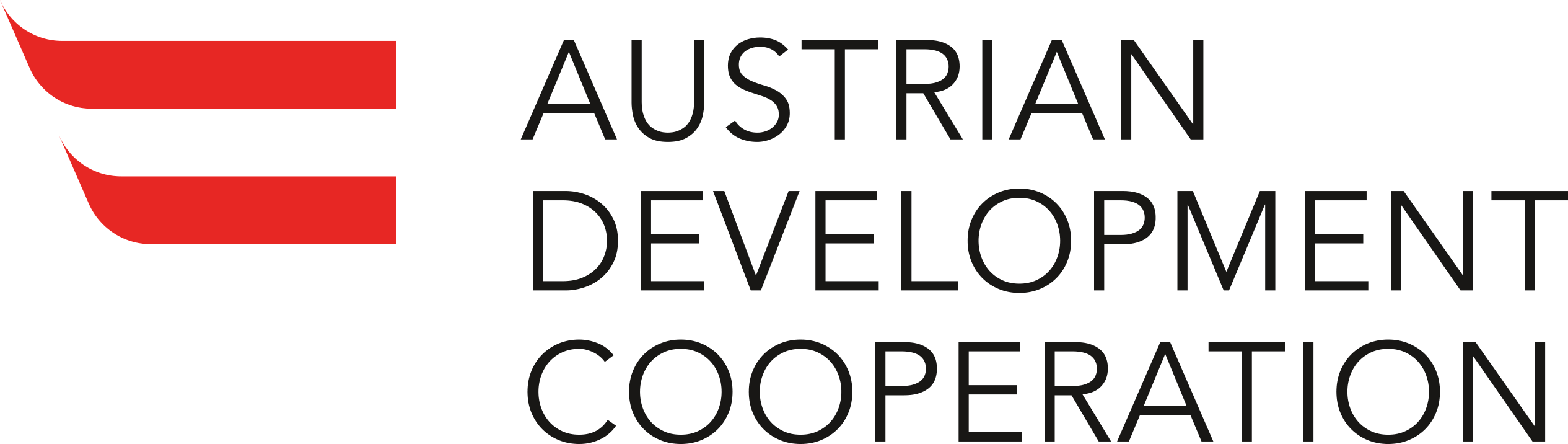
Logo Austrian Development Cooperation

Austrian Development Cooperation is a program of the government of Austria that funds countries in Africa, Asia, South-Eastern and Eastern Europe, and the Caribbean.

== Austrian official development assistance (ODA) ==
The legal basis for Austrian Development Cooperation is the Federal Development Cooperation Act (DCA) adopted in 2002 and amended in 2003. It contains a list of objectives that prescribes development-policy criteria for the federal administration. The central development-policy positions and framework are defined in the Three-Year-Program on Austrian Development Policy, under the Federal Ministry for European and International Affairs (FMEIA).
