= Ministry of Foreign Affairs (Austria) =

Government ministry of Austria

Federal Ministry for European and International Affairs
- Bundesministerium für europäische und internationale Angelegenheiten

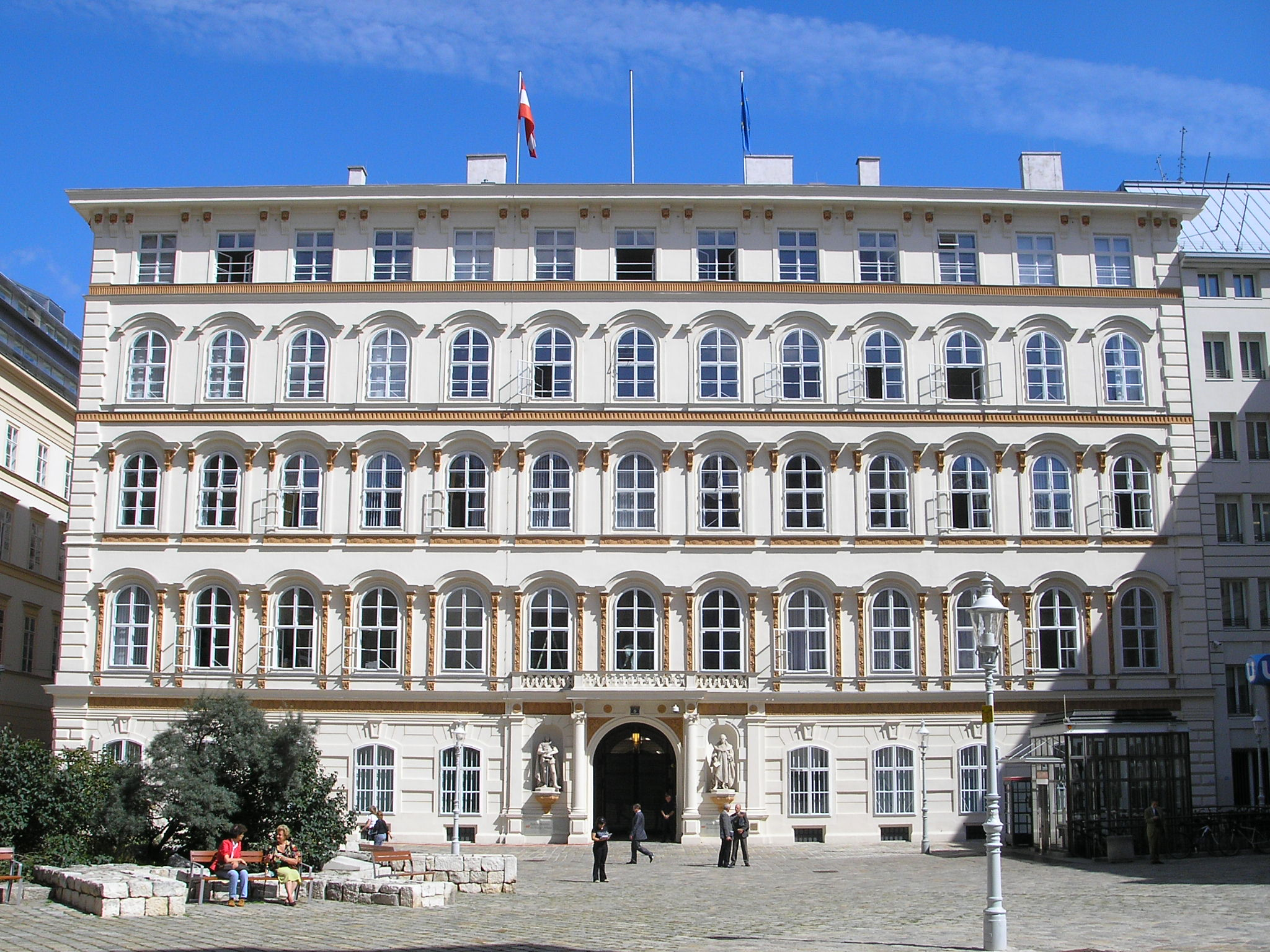

Agency overview
- Formed: 20 November 1920; 105 years ago
- Preceding agency: Imperial and Royal Ministry of Foreign Affairs
- Jurisdiction: Government of Austria
- Status: Highest federal authority
- Headquarters: Minoritenplatz, Innere Stadt, Vienna
- Annual budget: €508 million (2019)
- Minister responsible: Beate Meinl-Reisinger (NEOS)
- Agency executive: Peter Launsky-Tieffenthal, Secretary-General
- Website: www.bmeia.gv.at

The Ministry for European and International Affairs (German: Bundesministerium für europäische und internationale Angelegenheiten, abbreviated BMEIA, colloquially Außenministerium) is the government ministry of Austria responsible for diplomatic missions and immigration, the administration of foreign policy, and the maintenance of the country's relations with international organisations, especially the European Union. It oversees the Austrian embassies, consular representatives and other emissaries, and administers the naturalisation process and handles citizenship questions along with the Interior Ministry.

== Competencies ==
On 1 March 2007 the former Federal Ministry for External Affairs (Bundesministerium für auswärtige Angelegenheiten, BMaA) was renamed "Federal Ministry for European and International Affairs" which, as of 1 March 2014, changed to "Federal Ministry for Europe, Integration and Foreign Affairs". It is responsible for a variety of matters concerning Austria's foreign policy and relations, including matters of public international law, treaties and Austria's international representation in receiving states as well as to international organisations. It grants support for Austrian citizens staying or living abroad and foreign aid by mutual legal assistance treaties.

The ministry is also concerned with economic integration, European Union law, the Austrian relations to Central and Eastern Europe and the Commonwealth of Independent States (CIS), as well as development aid. It is responsible for matters of the International Atomic Energy Agency with its seat in Vienna, the United Nations High Commissioner for Refugees and the International Red Cross. The Diplomatic Academy of Vienna, formerly part of the ministry, since 1996 forms an autonomous organisation.

== History ==
The history of international diplomacy is closely connected to Vienna. Diplomats were for the first time classified as such at the Congress of Vienna in 1815. Furthermore, the United Nations' conferences which led to the Vienna Convention on Diplomatic Relations (1961) and the Vienna Convention on Consular Relations (1963) were both held in Austria's capital city.

The year 1720 is considered to be the origin of an independent Austrian diplomatic service, which was when Emperor Charles VI assigned the administration of foreign relations of the Habsburg monarchy to a separate minister. For about 200 years, the external relations of the Austrian Empire proclaimed in 1804 and succeeding Austria-Hungary remained the monarch's prerogative and his assigned minister not accountable to the Imperial Council nor the Diet of Hungary. From 1809 until the Revolutions of 1848, the office of the Austrian Foreign Minister was shaped by Prince Klemens von Metternich. Upon the Austro-Hungarian Compromise of 1867, the Imperial and Royal (k. u. k.) Foreign Ministry of Austria-Hungary was one three common ministries responsible for both parts of the real union. In 1882 Foreign Minister Count Gustav Kálnoky forged the Triple Alliance with the German Empire and the Kingdom of Italy, which, however, could not arrest the proceeding Austrian isolation nor internal nationalist unrest. During the July Crisis of 1914, Minister Count Leopold Berchtold, urged by Chief of Staff Count Franz Conrad von Hötzendorf, issued the fatal ultimatum to Serbia, followed by the declaration of war a few days later.

After World War I and the break-up of the Austro-Hungarian monarchy, foreign affairs were attended to by the Federal Chancellery. It was not before 1959 that a separate Federal Ministry for Foreign Affairs (German: Bundesministerium für auswärtige Angelegenheiten or BMaA) was established.

With the government under Federal Chancellor Alfred Gusenbauer, the former BMaA was renamed "Federal Ministry for European and International Affairs" in 2007 to better reflect and express "the interconnection, networking, partnership and solidarity characterising Austria's international relations", as former Foreign Minister Ursula Plassnik put it. The old name had "rather conveyed the additional nuance of a demarcation".

As part of the amendment to the Federal Ministries Act and the swearing-in of Sebastian Kurz as Foreign Minister on 16 December 2013, the responsibilities of the former State Secretariat for Integration were transferred to the Foreign Ministry. Effective March 1, 2014, it was therefore renamed "Federal Ministry for Europe, Integration and Foreign Affairs".

On 29 January 2020, it was renamed "Federal Ministry for European and International Affairs", and Integration was placed under the ministry of Susanne Raab.
