= Lists of ambassadors =

An ambassador is an official envoy, especially a highest ranking diplomat who represents a state and is usually accredited to another sovereign state, or to an international organization as the resident representative of their own government or sovereign or appointed for a special and often temporary diplomatic assignment. The word is also often used more liberally for persons who are known, without national appointment, to represent certain professions, activities and fields of endeavor.

== Ambassadors ==
Country	List of ambassadors
Afghanistan	Ambassadors of Afghanistan; Ambassadors of Afghanistan to Japan
Albania	Ambassadors of Albania
Angola	Ambassadors of Angola; Ambassadors to Angola
Armenia	Ambassadors of Armenia
Australia	Ambassadors and high commissioners of Australia
Austria	Ambassadors of Austria
Bangladesh	High commissioners of Bangladesh to Canada; Ambassadors of Bangladesh to the United States
Belgium	Ambassadors from Belgium; Ambassadors of Belgium to South Korea; Ambassadors of Belgium to the United States; Ambassadors to Belgium
Brazil	Ambassadors of Brazil to Japan; Ambassadors of Brazil to the United Kingdom; Ambassadors of Brazil to the United States
Brunei	Ambassadors of Brunei to the United States
Bulgaria	Ambassadors of Bulgaria to the United States
Cambodia	Ambassadors of Cambodia
Canada	Ambassadors of Canada
Chile	Ambassadors of Chile to the United States
China	Ambassadors of China
Colombia	Ambassadors of Colombia to the United States; Ambassadors to Colombia
Czech Republic	Ambassadors of the Czech Republic to Russia
Denmark	Ambassadors of Denmark; Ambassadors of Denmark to the United States; Ambassadors of Denmark to South Korea
Dominican Republic	Ambassadors of the Dominican Republic to China; Ambassadors of the Dominican Republic to Chile; Ambassadors of the Dominican Republic to the United States
Egypt	Ambassadors from Egypt
Estonia	Ambassadors of Estonia to Russia; Ambassadors of Estonia to the United States
Finland	Ambassadors of Finland; Ambassadors to Finland
France	Ambassadors of France; Ambassadors to France
Germany	Ambassadors of Germany; Ambassadors to Germany
Ghana	Ambassadors and high commissioners of Ghana
Guinea	Ambassadors of Guinea to the United States
Hungary	Ambassadors of Hungary to the United Kingdom; Ambassadors of Hungary to the United States
Iceland	Ambassadors of Iceland
India	Ambassadors of India
Indonesia	Ambassadors of Indonesia
Iran	Ambassadors of Iran
Ireland	Ambassadors of Ireland to the United Kingdom
Israel	Ambassadors of Israel
Italy	Ambassadors of Italy
Japan	Ambassadors of Japan
Jordan	Ambassadors of Jordan
Laos	Ambassadors of Laos to the United States; Ambassadors of Laos to China
Latvia	Ambassadors of Latvia to China; Ambassadors of Israel to Latvia; Ambassadors of Latvia to the United States
Lebanon	Ambassadors of Lebanon to China; Ambassadors of Lebanon to the United States
Liechtenstein	Ambassadors of Liechtenstein to the United States; Ambassadors to Liechtenstein
Lithuania	Ambassadors to Lithuania
Luxembourg	Ambassadors of Luxembourg to China; Ambassadors of Luxembourg to India; Ambassadors of Luxembourg to the Czech Republic; Ambassadors of Luxembourg to the United States; Ambassadors to Luxembourg
Malaysia	Ambassadors and high commissioners of Malaysia; Ambassadors of Malaysia to Russia
Mexico	Ambassadors of Mexico to Serbia
Mongolia	Ambassadors of Mongolia to Russia
Montenegro	Ambassadors of Montenegro
Morocco	Ambassadors of Morocco to the United Kingdom
Myanmar	Ambassadors of Myanmar
New Zealand	Ambassadors of New Zealand
Nicaragua	Ambassadors of Nicaragua
Niger	Ambassadors of Niger to the United States
Nigeria	Ambassadors of Nigeria
Norway	Ambassadors of Norway to China
Oman	Ambassadors of Oman to the United States
Philippines	Ambassadors of the Philippines; Ambassadors to the Philippines
Poland	Ambassadors of Poland; Ambassadors of Poland to Russia; Ambassadors of Poland to the United Kingdom
Portugal	Ambassadors of Portugal to China; Ambassadors of Portugal to the United Kingdom; Ambassadors of Portugal to the United States
Qatar	Ambassadors of Qatar to China; Ambassadors of Qatar to the United States
Romania	Ambassadors of Romania to the United States
Russia	Ambassadors of Russia; Ambassadors from Russia
Serbia	Ambassadors of Serbia
Singapore	Ambassadors of Singapore; Ambassadors of Singapore to Russia
Spain	Ambassadors of Spain to Cuba; Ambassadors of Spain to the Netherlands; Ambassadors of Spain to the United States
Sweden	Ambassadors of Sweden
Switzerland	Ambassadors to Switzerland; Ambassadors of Switzerland to Australia
Thailand	Current ambassadors of Thailand
Ukraine	Ambassadors of Ukraine
United Kingdom	Ambassadors of the United Kingdom
United States	Ambassadors of the United States; Ambassadors to the United States
Uruguay	Ambassadors of Uruguay; Ambassadors of Uruguay to the United States
Venezuela	Ambassadors of Venezuela to China; Ambassadors of Venezuela to Spain

== See also ==
- List of ambassadors of the Holy Roman Empire to England
- List of British colonial administrators of Aden
- List of current permanent representatives to the United Nations
- List of permanent delegates of New Zealand to UNESCO
