= List of ambassadors of Japan to Brazil =

The List of Japanese ambassadors to Brazil started when Chinda Sutemi presented his credentials to the Brazilian government in 1897.

== List ==
This is a chronological list of Japanese diplomats.

Inaugural date	Official position (Japanese)	Official position	Name (Japanese)	Name
August 23, 1897	弁理務使	Minister resident	珍田 捨巳	Chinda Sutemi
October 12, 1898	臨時代理公使	Chargé d'affaires ad interim	三浦 弥五郎	Miura Yagorō
July 4, 1899	弁理公使	Minister resident	大越 成徳	Okoshi Narinori
May 27, 1903	臨時代理公使	Chargé d'affaires ad interim	堀口 九萬一	Horiguchi Kumaichi
April 19, 1905	弁理公使	Minister resident	杉村 濬	Sugimura Fukashi
May 21, 1906	臨時代理公使	Chargé d'affaires ad interim	三浦 荒次郎	Miura Arajirō
March 15, 1907	弁理公使	Minister resident	内田 定槌	Uchida Sadatsuchi
October 9, 1907	特命全権公使	Minister Plenipotentiary	内田 定槌	Uchida Sadatsuchi
June 16, 1910	臨時代理公使	Chargé d'affaires ad interim	野田 良治	Noda Ryōji
January 8, 1911	臨時代理公使	Chargé d'affaires ad interim	藤田 敏郎	Fujita Toshirō
July 14, 1913	臨時代理公使	Chargé d'affaires ad interim	野田 良治	Noda Ryōji
August 18, 1913	特命全権公使	Minister Plenipotentiary	畑 良太郎	Hata RyōTarō
March 25, 1917	臨時代理公使	Chargé d'affaires ad interim	野田 良治	Noda Ryōji
October 30, 1918	特命全権公使	Minister Plenipotentiary	堀口 九萬一	Horiguchi Kumaichi
May 1, 1923	臨時代理大使	Chargé d'affaires ad interim	堀口 九萬一	Horiguchi Kumaichi
May 28, 1923	臨時代理大使	Chargé d'affaires ad interim	野田 良治	Noda Ryōji
August 16, 1923	特命全権大使	Ambassador	田付 七太	Tatsuke Shichita
August 31, 1926	臨時代理大使	Chargé d'affaires ad interim	赤松 祐之	Akamatsu Sukeyuki
January 25, 1927	特命全権大使	Ambassador	有吉 明	Ariyoshi Akira
April 16, 1930	臨時代理大使	Chargé d'affaires ad interim	縫田 栄四郎	Nuita Eishirō
December 15, 1931	臨時代理大使	Chargé d'affaires ad interim	黒沢 二郎	Kurosawa Jirō
August 14, 1932	特命全権大使	Ambassador	林 久治郎	Hayashi Kyūjirō
September 13, 1934	臨時代理大使	Chargé d'affaires ad interim	内山 岩太郎	Uchiyama Iwatarō
January 18, 1935	特命全権大使	Ambassador	沢田 節蔵	Sawada Setsuzō
November 10, 1938	臨時代理大使	Chargé d'affaires ad interim	天城 篤治	Amagi Tokuji
January 10, 1939	特命全権大使	Ambassador	桑島 主計	Kuwashima Kazue
September 20, 1940	臨時代理大使	Chargé d'affaires ad interim	工藤 忠夫	Kudo Tadao
November 13, 1940	特命全権大使	Ambassador	石射 猪太郎	Ishii Itarō
July 3, 1942	Second World War			
April 28, 1952	臨時代理大使	Chargé d'affaires ad interim	原 馨	Hara Kaoru
September 29, 1952	特命全権大使	Ambassador	君塚 慎	Kimizuka Nobuo
February 19, 1955	臨時代理大使	Chargé d'affaires ad interim	吉田 賢吉	Yoshida Kenkichi
March 30, 1955	特命全権大使	Ambassador	安東 義良	Andō Yoshirō
June 1, 1961	臨時代理大使	Chargé d'affaires ad interim	藤田 久治郎	Fujita Kyūjirō
July 24, 1961	特命全権大使	Ambassador	田付 景一	Tatsuke Keiichi
July 6, 1967	臨時代理大使	Chargé d'affaires ad interim	西宮 信安	Nishimiya Nobuyasu
September 20, 1967	特命全権大使	Ambassador	千葉 皓	Chiba Kō
November 27, 1970	臨時代理大使	Chargé d'affaires ad interim	荒木 外喜三	Araki Tokizō
January 13, 1971	特命全権大使	Ambassador	中村 茂	Nakamura Shigeru
July 18, 1973	臨時代理大使	Chargé d'affaires ad interim	浅羽 満夫	Asaba Mitsuo
August 6, 1973	特命全権大使	Ambassador	宇山 厚	Uyama Atsushi
November 4, 1975	臨時代理大使	Chargé d'affaires ad interim	浅羽 満夫	Asaba Mitsuo
February 9, 1976	特命全権大使	Ambassador	吉田 健三	Yoshida Kenzō
May 3, 1979	臨時代理大使	Chargé d'affaires ad interim	塚田 千裕	Tsukada Chihiro
July 17, 1979	特命全権大使	Ambassador	大口 信夫	Oguchi Nobuo
December 18, 1982	臨時代理大使	Chargé d'affaires ad interim	松村 慶次郎	Matsumura Keijirō
January 5, 1983	特命全権大使	Ambassador	伊達 邦美	Tate Kuniyoshi
April 9, 1986	臨時代理大使	Chargé d'affaires ad interim	賀来 弓月	Kaku Yuzuki
May 9, 1986	特命全権大使	Ambassador	小村 康一	Komura Kouichi
February 18, 1989	臨時代理大使	Chargé d'affaires ad interim	佐々木 伸太郎	Sasaki Shintarō
March 2, 1989	特命全権大使	Ambassador	賀陽 治憲	Kaya Harunori

== See also ==
- List of ambassadors of Brazil to Japan
- Japanese people in Brazil
- Brazil–Japan relations
- Diplomatic rank
