= List of ambassadors to Finland =

This is a list of ambassadors to Finland. Note that some ambassadors are responsible for more than one country while others are directly accredited to Helsinki

== Current Ambassadors to Finland ==
Sending country	Location of Embassy (City)	Location of Embassy (Country)	Ambassador
Afghanistan	Stockholm	Sweden	Najibullah Mohajer (Chargés d'Affaires a.i.)
Albania	Stockholm	Sweden	Ilir Abdi
Algeria	Stockholm	Sweden	Nawal Settouti
Andorra	Andorra la Vella	Andorra	Maria Noguer González (Chargés d'Affaires a.i.)
Angola	Stockholm	Sweden	Isaías Jaime Vilinga (Chargés d'Affaires a.i.)
Argentina	Helsinki	Finland	Carlos Santiago Risso Domínguez (Chargés d'Affaires a.i.)
Armenia	Yerevan	Armenia	Artak Apitonian
Australia	Stockholm	Sweden	Gerald Thomson
Austria	Helsinki	Finland	Elisabeth Kehrer
Azerbaijan	Stockholm	Sweden	Adish Mammadov
Bangladesh	Stockholm	Sweden	Golam Sarwar
Barbados	Brussels	Belgium	Samuel Jefferson Chandler (Chargé d'Affaires a.i.)
Belarus	Helsinki	Finland	Alexander Ostrovsky
Belgium	Helsinki	Finland	Philippe Beke
Benin	Copenhagen	Denmark	Eusèbe Agbangla
Bhutan	Brussels	Belgium	Sonam Tshong (Chargé d'Affaires a.i.)
Bolivia	Stockholm	Sweden	Milton Soto Santiesteban
Bosnia and Herzegovina	Stockholm	Sweden	Vesna Ćužić (Chargés d'Affaires a.i.)
Botswana	Stockholm	Sweden	Lameck Nthekela
Brazil	Helsinki	Finland	Antonio Francisco Da Costa E Silva Neto
Brunei	Berlin	Germany	Rakiah Abd Lamit
Bulgaria	Helsinki	Finland	Martin Ivanov
Burkina Faso	Copenhagen	Denmark	Basnewende Martine Eliane Ouedraogo Gyenguere (Chargés d’Affaires a.i.)
Burundi	Berlin	Germany	Annonciata Sendazirasa
Cambodia	London	United Kingdom	Kim Heng Meas
Cameroon	London	United Kingdom	Denis Nyuydzewira (Chargé d'Affaires a.i.)
Canada	Helsinki	Finland	Andrée N. Cooligan
Cape Verde	Berlin	Germany	vacant
Central African Republic	Brussels	Belgium	N/A
Chile	Helsinki	Finland	Daniel Mora (Chargés d'Affaires a.i.)
China	Helsinki	Finland	Qingtai Yu (Chargés d'Affaires a.i.)
Colombia	Stockholm	Sweden	Fulvia Elvira Benavides Cotes
Comoros	Paris	France	N/A
Congo	Moscow	Russia	Aimé Clovis Guillond
Côte d'Ivoire	Copenhagen	Denmark	Mina Marie Baldé Laurent
Croatia	Helsinki	Finland	Krešimir Kopčić
Cuba	Helsinki	Finland	Eduardo Lazo Pérez
Cyprus	Helsinki	Finland	Evangelos Savva
Czech Republic	Helsinki	Finland	Martin Tomčo
Democratic Republic of Congo	London	United Kingdom	N/A
Denmark	Helsinki	Finland	Jette Nordam
Dominican Republic	Stockholm	Sweden	N/A
Djibouti	Moscow	Russia	Mohamed Ali Kamil
Ecuador	Stockholm	Sweden	Lautero Pozo MaloMurgueytio
Egypt	Stockholm	Sweden	Mahmoud Gamil Ahmed Eldieb
El Salvador	Stockholm	Sweden	Anita Cristina Escher Escheverría
Eritrea	Stockholm	Sweden	N/A
Estonia	Helsinki	Finland	Margus Laidre
Ethiopia	Stockholm	Sweden	Woinshet Tadesse Woldegiorgis
France	Helsinki	Finland	Serge Mostura
Gabon	London	United Kingdom	N/A
Gambia	London	United Kingdom	Elizabeth Ya Eli Harding
Georgia	Stockholm	Sweden	Ucha Gabechava (Chargés d'Affaires a.i.)
Germany	Helsinki	Finland	Dorothee Janetzke-Wenzel
Ghana	Copenhagen	Denmark	Edith Hazel
Greece	Helsinki	Finland	Dimitrios Karabalis
Grenada	Brussels	Belgium	N/A
Guatemala	Stockholm	Sweden	Jorge Ricardo Putzeys Uriguen
Guinea	Moscow	Russia	Mohamed Keita
Guinea-Bissau	Brussels	Belgium	N/A
Guyana	Brussels	Belgium	N/A
Holy See	Stockholm	Sweden	Henryk Józef Nowacki
Honduras	Stockholm	Sweden	N/A
Hungary	Helsinki	Finland	Kristóf Forrai
Iceland	Helsinki	Finland	Árni Þór Sigurðsson
India	Helsinki	Finland	Raveesh Kumar
Indonesia	Helsinki	Finland	Ratu Silvy Gayatri
Iran	Helsinki	Finland	Kambiz Jalali
Iraq	Helsinki	Finland	Matheel Dhayif Majeed Al-Sabti
Ireland	Helsinki	Finland	Colm Ó Floinn
Israel	Helsinki	Finland	Arezoo Hersel (Chargés d'Affaires a.i.)
Italy	Helsinki	Finland	Gabriele Altana
Jamaica	London	United Kingdom	Aloun Angela N'Dombet-Assamba
Japan	Helsinki	Finland	Jota Yamamoto
Jordan	Berlin	Germany	Mazen Tal
Kazakhstan	Helsinki	Finland	Murat Nurtleuov
Kenya	Stockholm	Sweden	Joseph Kiprono Sang
Kosovo	Stockholm	Sweden	Ilir Dugolli
Kuwait	Moscow	Russia	Abdulaziz A.S. Aladwani
Kyrgyzstan	Moscow	Russia	Shamilbek Asymbekov
Laos	Stockholm	Sweden	Bounpheng Saykanya
Latvia	Helsinki	Finland	Ugis Bambe
Lebanon	Stockholm	Sweden	N/A
Lesotho	Dublin	Ireland	Paramente Phamotse
Liberia	Berlin	Germany	Ethel Davis
Libya	Stockholm	Sweden	N/A
Lithuania	Helsinki	Finland	Ingrida Darašaitė (Chargés d'Affaires a.i.)
Luxembourg	Copenhagen	Denmark	Gérard Philipps
Madagascar	Berlin	Germany	N/A
Malawi	London	United Kingdom	Kena Mphonda
Malaysia	Helsinki	Finland	Blanche Olbery
Maldives	London	United Kingdom	N/A
Mali	Berlin	Germany	N/A
Malta	Valletta	Malta	Michael Zammit Tabona
Mauritania	Brussels	Belgium	Abdellahi Bah Nagi Kebd
Mauritius	London	United Kingdom	N/A
Mexico	Helsinki	Finland	Norma Bertha Pensado Moreno
Moldova	Stockholm	Sweden	N/A
Mongolia	Stockholm	Sweden	Altai Zorig
Montenegro	Podgorica	Montenegro	Miroslav Scepanovic
Morocco	Helsinki	Finland	Mohammed Ariad
Mozambique	Stockholm	Sweden	Frances Victoria Velho Rodrigues
Myanmar	Berlin	Germany	Yin Yin Myint
Namibia	Stockholm	Sweden	Bonny Haufiku
Nepal	Copenhagen	Denmark	Prakash Kumar Suvedi
Netherlands	Helsinki	Finland	Cornelis Jan Bansema
New Zealand	The Hague	Netherlands	Janet Lowe
Nicaragua	Helsinki	Finland	Ricardo José Alvarado Noguera
Niger	Berlin	Germany	Amadou Tcheko
Nigeria	Stockholm	Sweden	Jane Ada Ndem (Chargés d'Affaires a.i.)
North Korea	Stockholm	Sweden	Yong Dok Kang
North Macedonia	Stockholm	Sweden	N/A
Norway	Helsinki	Finland	Åge Bernhard Grutle
Oman	Berlin	Germany	Khalid S. Baomar
Pakistan	Stockholm	Sweden	Muhammad Tariq Zameer
Palestine	Helsinki	Finland	Taissir A.M. Al Adjouri
Panama	Stockholm	Sweden	Jaime Ortega Culacón
Paraguay	Berlin	Germany	José E. Gorostiaga-Peña (Chargé d'Affaires a.i.)
Peru	Helsinki	Finland	José Eduardo Chávarri Garcia
Philippines	Oslo	Norway	Jocelyn Batoon-García
Poland	Helsinki	Finland	Przemysław Grudziński
Portugal	Helsinki	Finland	
Qatar	Moscow	Russia	Saoud Abdulla Z. Al-Mahmoud
Romania	Helsinki	Finland	Marian Catalin Avramescu
Russia	Helsinki	Finland	Pavel Kuznetsov
Rwanda	Stockholm	Sweden	Christine Nkulikiyinka
Saint Vincent and the Grenadines	London	United Kingdom	Cenio E. Lewis
San Marino	Bologna	Italy	Mario Bortolini
Sao Tome and Principe	Brussels	Belgium	N/A
Saudi Arabia	Helsinki	Finland	Naif D.N. Al Aboud
Serbia	Helsinki	Finland	Slavko Kruljevic
Senegal	The Hague	Netherlands	Maymouna Diop Sy
Seychelles	London	United Kingdom	Marie-Pierre Lloyd
Singapore	Singapore	Singapore	Jayalekshmi Mohideen
Slovakia	Helsinki	Finland	Tibor Králik
Slovenia	Copenhagen	Denmark	Tone Kajzer
South Africa	Helsinki	Finland	Carmen Jolene Smidt
South Korea	Helsinki	Finland	Soo Gwon Kim
Spain	Helsinki	Finland	María Jesús Figa López-Palop
Sri Lanka	Stockholm	Sweden	Damayanthie Rajapakse
Sudan	Stockholm	Sweden	Mahgoob Mohamed Uthman
Swaziland	London	United Kingdom	N/A
Sweden	Helsinki	Finland	Nicola Clase
Switzerland	Helsinki	Finland	Maurice Darier
Syria	Stockholm	Sweden	N/A
Tanzania	Stockholm	Sweden	Dr. Willibrod Slaa
Thailand	Helsinki	Finland	Rachanant Thananant
Trinidad and Tobago	London	United Kingdom	N/A
Tunisia	Helsinki	Finland	Romdhane El Fayedh (Chargé d'Affaires e.p.)
Turkey	Helsinki	Finland	Mehmet Vakur Erkul
Turkmenistan	London	United Kingdom	Yazmurad Seryaev
Uganda	Copenhagen	Denmark	Zaake Wanume Kibedi
Ukraine	Helsinki	Finland	Andrii Olefirov
United Arab Emirates	Stockholm	Sweden	Rashid Obaid Saif Jubran Alsuwaidi
United Kingdom	Helsinki	Finland	Sarah Price
United States	Helsinki	Finland	Douglas Hickey
Uruguay	Helsinki	Finland	Pablo Sader
Uzbekistan	Riga	Latvia	Afzal Artikov
Venezuela	Helsinki	Finland	Prieto de Rodriguez (Chargé d'Affaires a. i.)
Vietnam	Helsinki	Finland	Phạm Thi Ngoc Bich
Yemen	Berlin	Germany	Walid Abdulwahed Mohamed Alethary (Chargé d'Affaires a.i.)
Zambia	Stockholm	Sweden	Edith Mutale (Chargé d'Affaires a. i.)
Zimbabwe	Stockholm	Sweden	N/A

== See also ==
- Foreign relations of Finland
- List of diplomatic missions of Finland
- List of diplomatic missions in Finland
