= Mutale (name) =

Mutale is a name of Zambian origin that may refer to:

- Mutale Nalumango (born 1955), Zambian educator and politician
- Mutale Nkonde, Zambian journalist and artificial intelligence policy researcher
- Bernard Mutale, Zambian football defender
- Billy Mutale (born 1993), Zambian footballer
- Edith Mutale (born 1994), Zambian women ambassador
- Kelvin Mutale (1969–1993), Zambian footballer
- Lucky Mutale (born 1955), retired Zambian boxer
- Vincent Mutale (born 1973), Zambian footballer
