= India–Luxembourg relations =

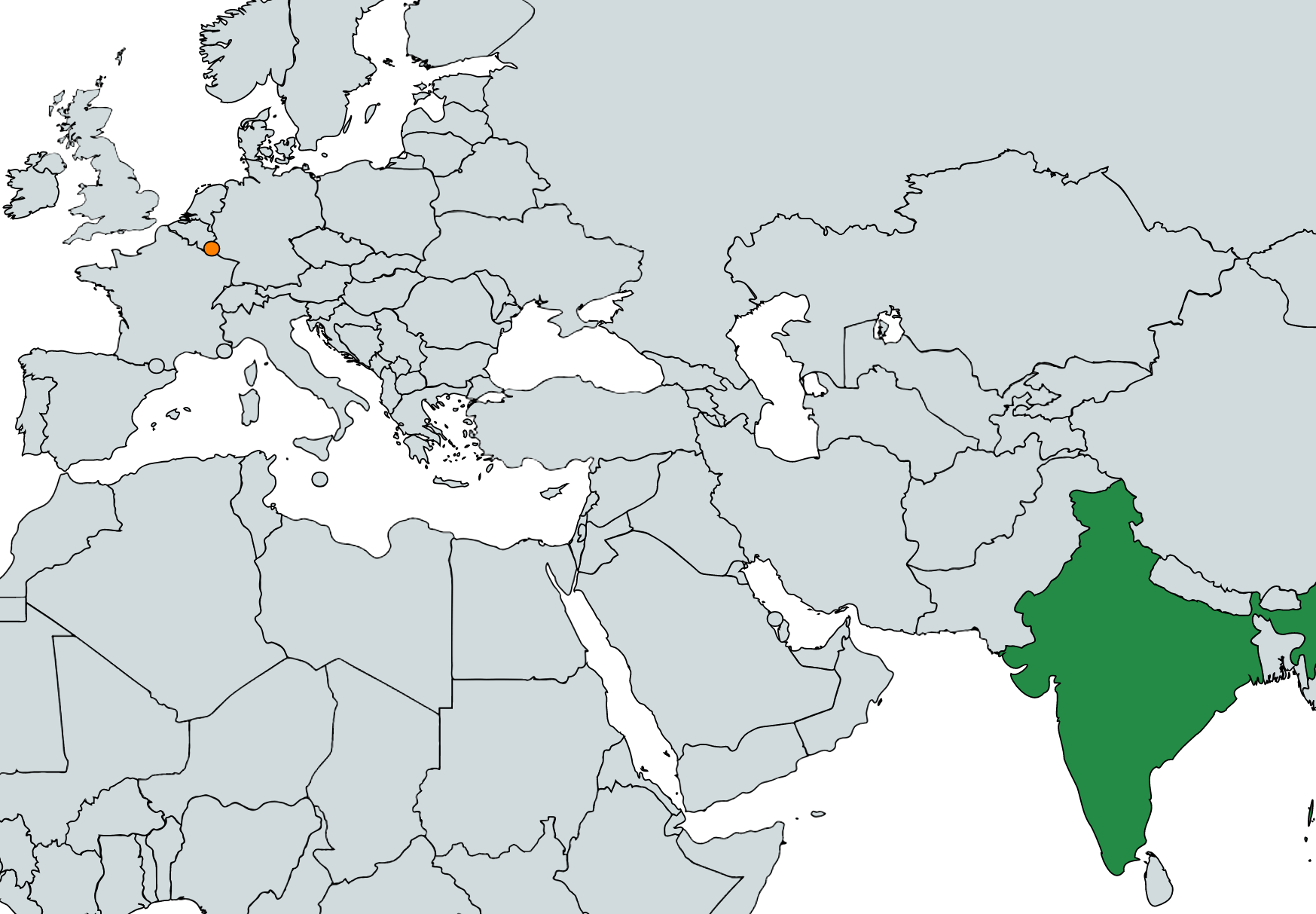

- India: Luxembourg

Diplomatic mission
- Embassy of India, Brussels: Embassy of Luxembourg, New Delhi

India–Luxembourg relations are the bilateral relations between India and Luxembourg. Luxembourg has an embassy in New Delhi, whilst the Indian Embassy in Brussels is accredited to Luxembourg.

== History ==
India–Luxembourg relations started in 1947, in recent years relations between the two nations have grown. Luxembourg opened its embassy in New Delhi in 2002. More than 170 Indian companies are listed on the Luxembourg Stock Exchange. Bilateral trade the two nations stood at $37.17 million from January–September 2014, with exports from India to Luxembourg at $7.79 million and imported goods to India from Luxembourg at $29.38 million. There is a significant community of Indians living in Luxembourg working in companies or fields such as ArcelorMittal, IT and Banking. There have been several major diplomatic visits by both countries to the other. Grand Duke Jean became the first Luxembourg Head of State to visit India in 1983 and since several trade and foreign affair ministers from Luxembourg have visited the country. In 2015, Foreign Minister Jean Asselborn visited the country. In 2012, India's Minister of External Affairs visited Luxembourg.

In 2019, Luxembourg plans to be the first European nation to host the annual Asian Infrastructure Investment Bank meeting. The nation is also planning an economic mission to India in the same year.

In 2023, Luxembourg Post issued a miniature sheet with a pair of postage stamps commemorating the 75 years of friendship between India and Luxembourg. The stamps honour Amar Nath Sehgal, a sculptor, painter and poet.

== Resident diplomatic missions ==
- India is accredited to Luxembourg from its embassy in Brussels, Belgium.
- Luxembourg has an embassy in New Delhi.

== See also ==
- Foreign relations of India
- Foreign relations of Luxembourg
- List of ambassadors of Luxembourg to India
