= List of ambassadors of Brazil to Japan =

The embassy is located at 2-11-12 Kita Aoyama, Minato-ku, Tokyo.

== List of ambassadors ==
A list of the Ambassadors of Brazil, or other heads of mission, to Japan:

Designated/ Accredited	End of Mission	Ambassador	Head of State	Prime Minister of Japan	Notes
15 September 1897	22 April 1899	Henrique Carlos Ribeiro Lisboa	Prudente de Morais	Matsukata Masayoshi	Minister Plenipotentiary of the Legation in Tokyo
5 July 1901	16 February 1903	Manuel de Oliveira Lima	Campos Sales	Katsura Tarō	Charge d'affaires
16 February 1903	4 June 1903	Manuel de Oliveira Lima	Rodrigues Alves	Katsura Tarō	Minister Plenipotentiary
4 June 1903	30 March 1909	Manuel Carlos Gonçalves Pereira	Rodrigues Alves	Katsura Tarō	Charge d'affaires
30 March 1909	August 1911	Manuel Carlos Gonçalves Pereira	Afonso Pena	Katsura Tarō	Minister Plenipotentiary
August 1911	November 1913	Gustavo de Viana Kelsch	Hermes da Fonseca	Katsura Tarō	Charge d'affaires
November 1913	October 1915	José Francisco de Barros Pimentel	Hermes da Fonseca	Yamamoto Gonnohyōe	Charge d'affaires
October 1915	7 July 1920	Epaminondas Leite Chermont	Venceslau Brás	Ōkuma Shigenobu	Minister Plenipotentiary
7 July 1920	18 September 1921	Godofredo de Bulhões	Epitácio Pessoa	Hara Takashi	Charge d'affaires
18 September 1921	30 December 1923	Epaminondas Leite Chermont	Epitácio Pessoa	Hara Takashi	Minister Plenipotentiary
January 1924	March 1925	Godofredo de Bulhões	Artur Bernardes	Yamamoto Gonnohyōe	Charge d'affaires
2 April 1925	21 September 1926	Rinaldo de Lima e Silva	Artur Bernardes	Katō Takaaki	Ambassador
21 September 1926	31 May 1927	Silvio Rangel de Castro	Artur Bernardes	Wakatsuki Reijirō	Charge d'affaires
31 May 1927	27 July 1927	Edmundo Machado Júnior	Washington Luís	Tanaka Giichi	Charge d'affaires
27 July 1927	17 December 1928	Antônio do Nascimento Feitosa	Washington Luís	Tanaka Giichi	Ambassador
17 December 1928	18 June 1929	Carlos Elias de Latorre Lisbôa	Washington Luís	Tanaka Giichi	Charge d'affaires
18 June 1929	19 April 1931	Hipólito Pacheco Alves de Araújo	Washington Luís	Hamaguchi Osachi	Ambassador
19 April 1931	8 June 1931	Carlos Elias de Latorre Lisbôa	Getúlio Vargas	Wakatsuki Reijirō	Charge d'affaires
9 June 1931	September 1934	Silvino Gurgel do Amaral	Getúlio Vargas	Wakatsuki Reijirō	Ambassador
September 1934	11 October 1935	Carlos Martins Pereira e Souza	Getúlio Vargas	Okada Keisuke	Ambassador
11 October 1935	24 November 1935	Antônio Moreira de Abreu	Getúlio Vargas	Okada Keisuke	Charge d'affaires
24 November 1935	9 March 1939	Pedro Leáo Velloso	Getúlio Vargas	Okada Keisuke	Ambassador
9 March 1939	24 March 1939	Rui Pinheiro Guimarães	Getúlio Vargas	Hiranuma Kiichirō	Charge d'affaires
24 March 1939	28 January 1942	Frederico de Castel Branco Clark	Getúlio Vargas	Hiranuma Kiichirō	Ambassador
May 1952	12 September 1952	Oswaldo Tavares	Getúlio Vargas	Yoshida Shigeru	Charge d'affaires
12 September 1952	23 March 1955	Julio Augusto Barosoa Carmeiro	Getúlio Vargas	Yoshida Shigeru	Ambassador
23 March 1955	18 June 1955	Heitor Beatos Tigre	Nereu Ramos	Hatoyama Ichirō	Charge d'affaires
18 June 1955	2 September 1955	Arnaldo Leão Marques	Nereu Ramos	Hatoyama Ichirō	Charge d'affaires
2 September 1955	6 June 1960	Roberto Mendes Goncalves	Nereu Ramos	Hatoyama Ichirō	Ambassador
6 June 1960	28 December 1960	João Augusto de Araújo Castro	Juscelino Kubitschek	Ikeda Hayato	Charge d'affaires
28 December 1960	22 November 1963	Décio Honorato de Moura	Juscelino Kubitschek	Ikeda Hayato	Ambassador
22 November 1963	6 March 1964	Murillo Gurgel Valente	João Goulart	Ikeda Hayato	Charge d'affaires
6 March 1964	6 May 1965	João Babtiste Pinheiro	João Goulart	Ikeda Hayato	Charge d'affaires
6 May 1965	9 October 1968	Álvaro Teixeira Soares	Humberto Castelo Branco	Satō Eisaku	Ambassador
9 October 1968	7 January 1969	Oscar Sotto Major Lorenz Fernandez	Artur da Costa e Silva	Satō Eisaku	Charge d'affaires
7 January 1969	28 May 1971	Geraldo de Carvalho Silos	Artur da Costa e Silva	Satō Eisaku	Ambassador
28 May 1971	22 October 1971	Nestor Luis Fernandes Barros dos Santos Lima	Emílio Garrastazu Médici	Satō Eisaku	Charge d'affaires
22 October 1971	30 September 1974	Paulo Leão de Moura	Emílio Garrastazu Médici	Satō Eisaku	Ambassador
30 September 1974	27 December 1974	Pauldo da Costa Franco	Ernesto Geisel	Tanaka Kakuei	Charge d'affaires
27 December 1974	13 July 1977	Hélio de Burgos Cabal	Ernesto Geisel	Miki Takeo	Ambassador
13 July 1977	5 September 1977	Jorge Pires de Rio	Ernesto Geisel	Fukuda Takeo	Charge d'affaires
5 September 1977	2 October 1982	Ronaldo Costa	Ernesto Geisel	Fukuda Takeo	Ambassador
2 October 1982	19 January 1983	Pauldo Dyrceu Pinheiro	Ernesto Geisel	Suzuki Zenkō	Charge d'affaires
19 January 1983	29 December 1986	Luiz Paulo Lindenberg Sette	João Figueiredo	Nakasone Yasuhiro	Ambassador
29 December 1986	28 May 1987	Ivan Oliveira Cannabrava	José Sarney	Nakasone Yasuhiro	Charge d'affaires
23 May 1987	June 1991	Carlos Antônio Bettencourt Bueno	José Sarney	Nakasone Yasuhiro	Ambassador
12 June 1991	1993	Carlos Luiz Coutinho Peres	Fernando Collor de Mello	Miyazawa Kiichi	Ambassador
1993	1995	Paulo Cardoso de Oliveira Pires do Rio	Itamar Franco	Hosokawa Morihiro	Ambassador
1995	2001	Fernando Guimarães Reis	Fernando Henrique Cardoso	Murayama Tomiichi	Ambassador
2001	2005	Ivan Oliveira Cannabrava	Fernando Henrique Cardoso	Koizumi Jun'ichirō	Ambassador
2005	2008	André Mattoso Maia Amado	Luiz Inácio Lula da Silva	Koizumi Jun'ichirō	Ambassador
2008	2010	Luiz Augusto de Castro Neves	Luiz Inácio Lula da Silva	Asō Tarō	Ambassador
2010	2013	Marcos Bezerra Abbott Galvão	Luiz Inácio Lula da Silva	Kan Naoto	Ambassador
2013		André Corrêa do Lago	Dilma Rousseff	Abe Shinzō	Ambassador

== See also ==
- List of ambassadors of Japan to Brazil
- Brazil–Japan relations
- Diplomatic rank
