= Setsuzō Sawada =

Setsuzō Sawada (澤田 節蔵, September 9, 1884 - July 4, 1976) was a Japanese diplomat.

== Early life ==
Born in Tottori Prefecture in what is now the town of Iwami, he graduated from the law faculty of the University of Tokyo and joined the Ministry of Foreign Affairs.

== Diplomatic career ==
He served in several key posts including Consul-General in New York (1929–30), Delegate to the League of Nations (1930–32), and Ambassador to Brazil (1934–38). As a pacifist, he opposed Japan's 1933 withdrawal from the League of Nations, and as a Roman Catholic, he made appeals to the Vatican in order to put an early end to World War II. He served as an advisor to the cabinet of Prime Minister Kantaro Suzuki late in the war.

In the wake of the war he was regarded, along with fellow veteran diplomat Naotake Sato, as one of the remaining elder statesmen of his generation.

== Later career ==
He established Nippon Cultural Broadcasting and served as its chairman. He served as the first president of the Tokyo University of Foreign Studies from 1949 to 1955.

== Family ==
One of his brothers served as Permanent Representative to the United Nations and was married to social worker Miki Sawada, while another brother was an industrialist.
