= Chinda Sutemi =

Japanese diplomat (1857–1929)

Junior First Rank Count Chinda Sutemi
- 珍田 捨巳
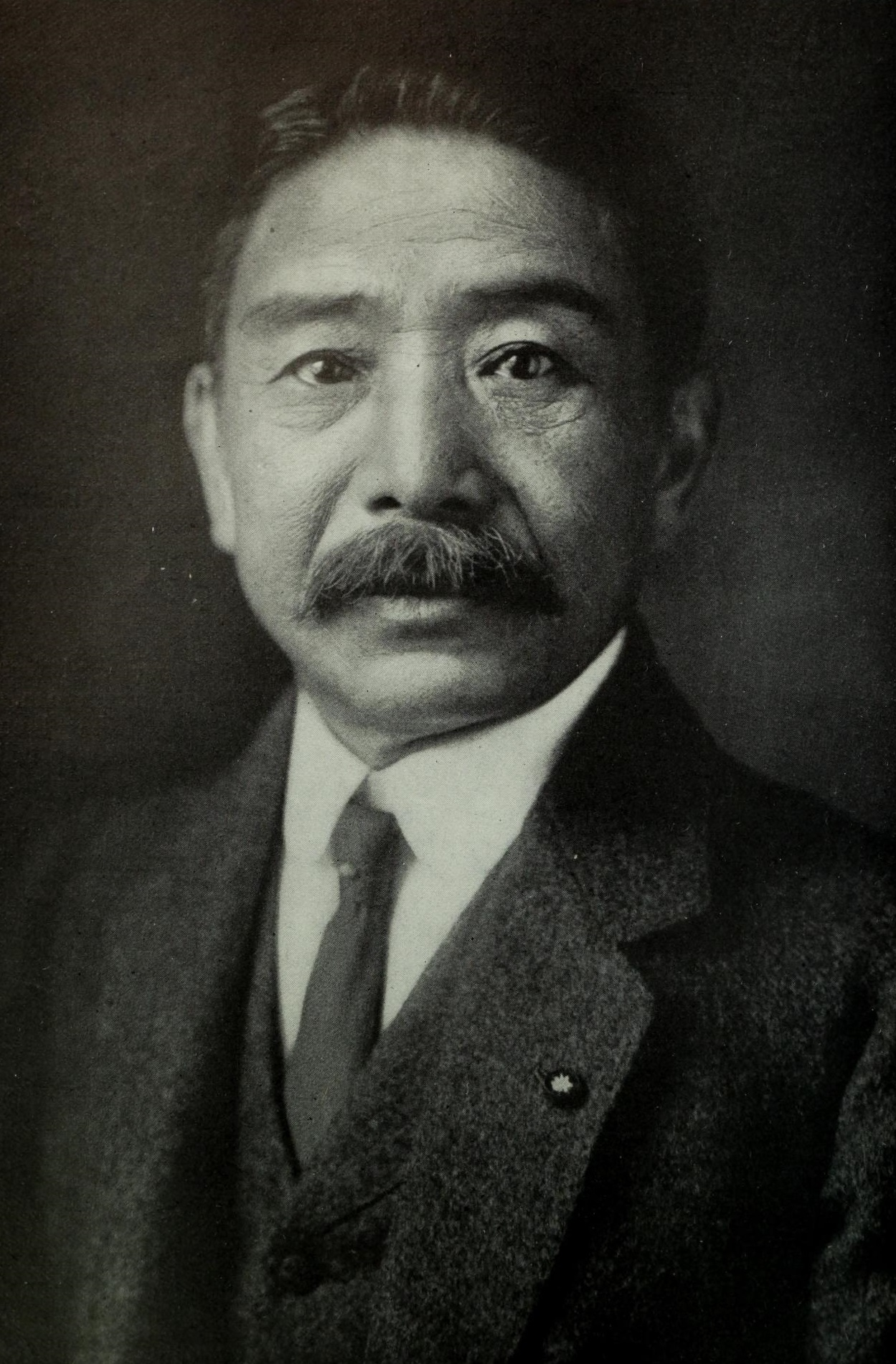
- Chinda Sutemi, by Harris & Ewing.

Grand Chamberlain to the Emperor
- In office 3 March 1927 – 16 January 1929
- Monarch: Hirohito
- Preceded by: Tokugawa Satotaka
- Succeeded by: Kantarō Suzuki

Member of the Privy Council
- In office 22 October 1919 – 16 January 1929
- Monarchs: Taishō; Hirohito

Personal details
- Born: 19 January 1857 Hirosaki, Mutsu, Japan
- Died: 16 January 1929 (aged 71) Kōjimachi, Tokyo, Japan
- Resting place: Aoyama Cemetery
- Education: DePauw University

Count Chinda Sutemi (珍田 捨巳; 19 January 1857 – 16 January 1929) was a Japanese diplomat and courtier who served as Grand Chamberlain to the Emperor from 1927 to 1929.

During his diplomatic career, he served as ambassador to Germany, the United States and Great Britain. He was a plentipotentiary at the 1919 Paris Peace Conference.

== Diplomatic career ==
He was born 19 January 1857, in Hirosaki, Aomori.

In 1877 he went to study at DePauw University in the United States. He got his B.A. in 1881, and M.A. in 1884. In 1882 he married, and had one son.

From 1890 to 1894, Chinda served as Japanese Consul in San Francisco, California. In 1897 Chinda was appointed first Japanese Minister Plenipotentiary to Brazil, following the establishment of diplomatic relations between the two states in 1895. He served as Japanese Ambassador to Germany from 1908 to 1911, to the United States from 1912 to 1916.

Ambassador Chinda Sutemi and his wife Japanese Viscountess Chinda Iwa were two of the diplomats involved with the Japanese gifting of the cherry blossom trees to Washington, D.C. in 1912.

Chinda served as ambassador to the United Kingdom from 1916 to 1920, during which time he also took part in the Japanese delegation to the Paris Peace Conference, 1919. He was part of the Commission on Colonial Mandates, which drafted a mandates system that would subject of approval by the League of Nations members.

In January 1919, Chinda wrote to Chaim Weizmann that, "the Japanese government gladly takes note of the Zionism aspiration to extend in Palestine a national home for the Jewish people and they look forward with a sympathetic interest to the realization of such desire upon the basis proposed."

In 1919, he was a plenipotentiary ambassador for Japan in its delegation to the Paris Peace Conference where he signed the Treaty of Versailles and advocated for racial equality.

In 1921, Chinda was selected by Imperial Household Minister Makino Nobuaki to serve as Grand Master of Crown Prince Hirohito's Household. When the Crown Prince acceded to the throne in 1926, Chinda was appointed Grand Master of the Empress's Household, before being promoted to Grand Chamberlain to the Emperor in March 1927. He was one of the Emperor's closest advisors during his early reign. Chinda died on 16 January 1929.

He was also a Methodist minister.

== Honours ==
From the Japanese Wikipedia article

=== Titles ===
- Baron (21 September 1907)
- Viscount (24 August 1911)
- Count (7 September 1920)

=== Decorations (Japanese) ===
- Grand Cordon of the Order of the Sacred Treasure (1 April 1906; Third Class: 5 March 1902; Fourth Class: 28 June 1898; Fifth Class: 31 October 1895)
- Grand Cordon of the Order of the Rising Sun (14 September 1907)
- Grand Cordon of the Order of the Rising Sun with Paulownia Flowers (7 September 1920)

=== Court order of precedence ===
- Seventh rank (27 November 1886)
- Sixth rank (21 December 1891)
- Senior sixth rank (20 September 1895)
- Senior fifth rank (20 August 1897)
- Fourth rank (31 January 1901)
- Senior fourth rank (20 March 1906)
- Third rank (30 April 1909)
- Senior third rank (11 May 1914)
- Second rank (30 May 1921)
- Senior second rank (1 June 1928)
- First rank (16 January 1929)

== See also ==
- List of Japanese ministers, envoys and ambassadors to Germany
