= List of ambassadors of Luxembourg to China =

Coordinates: 39.932873°N 116.459283°E

Ambassador of Luxembourg to the People's Republic of China
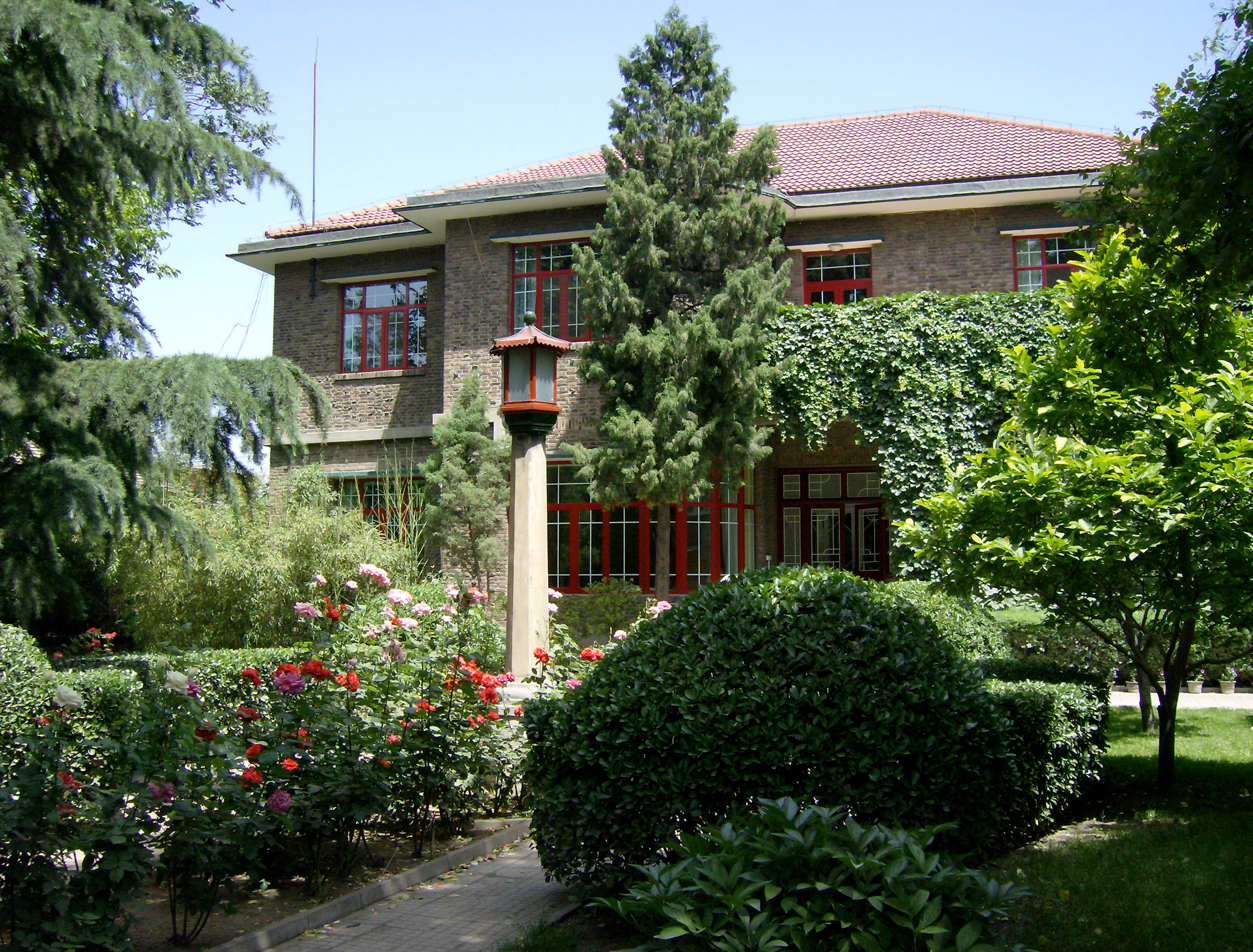
- Incumbent; Marc Hübsch since April 2017
- Inaugural holder: Carlo Ketter
- Formation: April 15, 1982

The Luxembourger ambassador in Beijing is the official representative of the Government in Luxembourg City to the Government of the People's Republic of China concurrently accredited in Ulaanbaatar (Mongolia), Hanoi (Vietnam) and Singapore.

== List of representatives ==
Diplomatic agrément/Diplomatic accreditation	Ambassador	Observations	List of prime ministers of Luxembourg	Premier of the People's Republic of China	Term end
November 16, 1972		Mutual recognition	Pierre Werner	Zhou Enlai	
August 1, 1979		Luxembourg opened its embassy in Beijing	Gaston Thorn	Hua Guofeng	
April 15, 1982	Carlo Ketter		Pierre Werner	Zhao Ziyang	
July 4, 1986	Paul Schuller		Jacques Santer	Zhao Ziyang	
1989		Following the Tiananmen Square protests of 1989, the European Community imposed economic sanctions on China.	Jacques Santer	Li Peng	1991
November 16, 1991	Georges Santer		Jacques Santer	Li Peng	
1998	Martine Schommer		Jean-Claude Juncker	Zhu Rongji	July 10, 2002
September 3, 2002	Marc Ungeheuer		Jean-Claude Juncker	Zhu Rongji	
September 30, 2007	Carlo Krieger	Till 2007 he was ambassador in Moscow.	Jean-Claude Juncker	Wen Jiabao	
October 11, 2013	Paul Steinmetz (Luxembourger diplomat)	In 2006 he was Ambassador in New Delhi to India.	Jean-Claude Juncker	Li Keqiang	
April 2017	Marc Hübsch		Xavier Bettel	Li Keqiang	
