= Edīte Medne =

Latvian ambassador

Edīte Medne is the Latvian ambassador to Georgia, replacing Ingrīda Levrence. She was appointed in 2022.

== Biography ==
At the University of Latvia, Medne studied history and philosophy.

== Career ==
Medne began her diplomatic career in 1995 and has served as the Latvian Permanent Representative to the European Union. In 2018, she was Deputy Head of Mission for the Latvian Embassy in Dublin.
