= Ingrīda Levrence =

Latvian diplomat

Ingrīda Levrence is a Latvian diplomat who was Ambassador to China and Georgia. She was replaced in August 2022 by Edīte Medne. She was concurrently accredited to Armenia.

Before she became the ambassador to China in 2008, Levrence was an assistant state secretary in the Ministry of Foreign Affairs in Riga.
