= List of ambassadors of Nigeria =

This is a list of the current Ambassadors of Nigeria.

Host country	Ambassador	Location	Since
Germany	Yusuf Tuggar		September 2017
Canada	Ojo Maduekwe	Ottawa	
France	Hakeem O. Sulaiman	Paris	20 February 2014
Belgium	Felix Edobor Awanbor	Brussels	
Netherlands	Nyimenuate Oji Ngofa	The Hague	7 October 2017
Japan	Mohammed Gana	Tokyo	25 September 2016
