= List of ambassadors of Mexico to Serbia =

This is a list of Mexico's ambassadors to Serbia (as well as Serbia and Montenegro and Yugoslavia).

Federal People's Republic of Yugoslavia

- 1946–1947: Alfonso de Rosenzweig Díaz
- 1947–1950: Francisco del Río y Cañedo
- 1950–1951: Víctor Fernández Manero,
- 1951–1952: Cristóbal Guzmán Cárdenas
- 1953–1954: Eduardo Morillo Safa Briones
- 1955–1957: Federico Amaya Rodríguez
- 1958–1961: Vicente L. Benéitez
- 1961–1965: Delfín Sánchez Juárez Lazo

Socialist Federal Republic of Yugoslavia

- 1965–1968: Natalio Vázquez Pallares
- 1968–1973: Ramón Ruiz Vasconcelos
- 1976–1977: Emilio Calderón Puig
- 1977–1978: Jorge Eduardo Navarrete López
- 1979–1981: Omar Martínez Legorreta
- 1981–1982: Javier Wimer Zambrano
- 1983–1987: Francisco López Cámara
- 1987–1990: Henrique González Casanova del Valle
- 1991–1992: Agustín García López Santaolalla

Fedderal Republic of Yugosalvia

- 1992–1994: Carlos Isauro Félix Corona
- 1994: Gonzalo Aguirre Enrile
- 1994–1996: Carlos Virgilio Ferrer Argote
- 1996–1999: Carlos Ignacio Gónzalez Magallón
- 2000–2003: Carlos Alejandro Rodríguez y Quezada

State Union of Serbia and Montenegro

- 2003–2004: Carlos Alejandro Rodríguez y Quezada
- 2005–2006: Eduardo Héctor Moguel Flores

Republic of Serbia

- 2006–2009: Eduardo Héctor Moguel Flores
- 2009–2014: Mercedes Felicitas Ruiz Zapata
- 2014–2016: José Evaristo Ramón Xilotl Ramírez
- 2016-2020: Marco Antonio García Blanco
- 2020–present: Carlos Isauro Félix Corona

== See also ==
- Mexico–Serbia relations
- Mexico–Yugoslavia relations
