= List of ambassadors of Jordan =

This is a list of ambassadors from Jordan

- Nazzal al-Armouti
- Hussein Majali
- Ahmad Masa'deh
- Hasan Abu Nimah
- Hazem Nuseibeh
- Makram Mustafa Queisi
- Abdelmunim Al-Rifai
- Hani Bahjat Tabbara
- Nabil Talhouni
- Khaldoun Talhouni
- Bahjat Talhouni
- Umayya Toukan
- Amjad Jamil Quhaiwi
