= List of ambassadors of Venezuela to China =

Coordinates: 39.938865°N 116.455868°E

Ambassador of Venezuela to China
- Inaugural holder: José Manuel Ferrer
- Formation: September 1949

The Venezuelan Ambassador in Beijing is the official representative of the Government in Caracas to the Government of China.

== List of representatives ==
Diplomatic agreement/designated/Diplomatic accreditation	Ambassador	Observations	List of presidents of Venezuela	Premier of the People's Republic of China	Term end
August 1944		The governments in Caracas and Chongqing established diplomatic relations.	Isaías Medina Angarita	Chiang Kai-shek	
September 1949	José Manuel Ferrer	Chargé d'affaires	Carlos Delgado Chalbaud	Yan Xishan	
February 1966	José Gil Borges		Raúl Leoni	Yen Chia-kan	
June 28, 1974		The governments in Caracas and Beijing established diplomatic relations.	Carlos Andrés Pérez	Zhou Enlai	
December 12, 1975	José de Jesus Sanchez Carrero		Carlos Andrés Pérez	Zhou Enlai	October 31, 1977
July 6, 1979	Régulo Burelli Rivas		Luis Herrera Campins	Hua Guofeng	
November 29, 1985	Leonardo Díaz-González	(*December 6, 1928 Doctor of laws and economic from the Sorbonne.: From 1951 to 1955 he was employed at the Mission next to the UNESCO en Paris and showed at francophone bias.; From 1955 to 1957 he was secretary of embassy next the Unesco.; From 1957 to 1963 he was successively Chief of International Conferences and Sub-director of international Policy in Caracas.; In January 1963 to 1967 he was minister at the Venezuelan Mission next the Headquarters of the United Nations and was a member of the Special Committee on Decolonization.; From 1967 to November 1971 he was Venezuelan Ambassador to Japan.; From November 1971 to March 1973 he was Venezuelan alternative representative next the Headquarters of the United Nations and was Chairman of the Special Committee on Decolonization.; In a US document he is described as anti-US over the status of Puerto Rico, Anti-British and Anti-Swedish.; From March 1973 November 29, 1985 he was director of international policy in Caracas.; A Widower and had a Teenage son who resided in the United States.	Jaime Lusinchi	Zhao Ziyang	October 19, 1991
October 19, 1991	Luis Eduardo Soto Álvarez	(*1943): From October 28, 1981 to September 14, 1984 he was Venezuelan Ambassador to India.; From 1997 to 2003 he was Venezuelan ambassador to Algeria (Tunisia, concurrently with Algiers).	Carlos Andrés Pérez	Li Peng	
May 15, 1998	Jocelyn Henríquez de King	Ambassadrice: On November 30, 1993 she became Venezuelan Ambassador to India (Bangladesh, Nepal and Sri Lanka).	Rafael Caldera	Zhu Rongji	
February 16, 2001	Juan de Jesus Montilla Saldivia		Hugo Chávez	Zhu Rongji	
September 24, 2004	Rocio Maneiro González		Hugo Chávez	Wen Jiabao	
May 27, 2013	Iván Antonio Zerpa Guerrero	On May 27, 2013 he appointed by the Supreme Court of Justice (TSJ) as alternate rector of the National Electoral Council.	Hugo Chávez	Li Keqiang	March 11, 2023
