= List of ambassadors of Luxembourg to India =

Peggy Frantzen

Luxembourg Ambassador to India
- Prime Minister: Luc Frieden

The ambassador from Luxembourg to India is the Grand Duchy of Luxembourg's foremost diplomatic representative in the Republic of India, and in charge of Luxembourg's diplomatic mission in India.

The embassy is in New Delhi, and was opened in 2002.

== List of heads of mission ==
=== Ambassador to India ===
- Paul Steinmetz (2002–2007)
- Marc Courte (2007-2011)
- Gaston Stronck (2011-2014)
- Sam Schreiner (2014–2018)
- Jean Claude Kugener (2018–2021)
- Peggy Frantzen (2021–2025)
- Christian Biever (2025–)
