= List of ambassadors of Latvia to China =

Ambassador of Latvia to the People's Republic of China
- Incumbent; Maija Manika since November 22, 2019
- Inaugural holder: Einars Semanis
- Formation: 2000

The Latvian ambassador in Beijing is the official representative of the Government in Riga to the Government of the People's Republic of China.

== List of representatives ==
Diplomatic agrément/Diplomatic accreditation	ambassador	Observations	President of Latvia	Premier of the People's Republic of China	Term end
2000	Einars Semanis	From 1999 to 2004 he was ambassador in Beijing; From 2005 to 2009 he was ambassador in Helsinki in Finland; From 2009 to 2013 he was ambassador in Warsaw, (Poland) and concurrent non-resident to the Holy See; In 2010 he was accredited non resident ambassador to Sofia Bulgaria and Bucharest (Romania)	Vaira Vīķe-Freiberga	Zhu Rongji	
2004	Jānis Lovniks	(* March 14, 1954 in Riga † January 6, 2009)	Vaira Vīķe-Freiberga	Wen Jiabao	2008
January 16, 2009	Ingrīda Levrence		Valdis Zatlers	Wen Jiabao	February 29, 2016
February 29, 2016	Māris Selga	Māris Selga replaces Ingrīda Levrence	Raimonds Vējonis	Li Keqiang	
