= Norma Pensado Moreno =

Mexican career diplomat

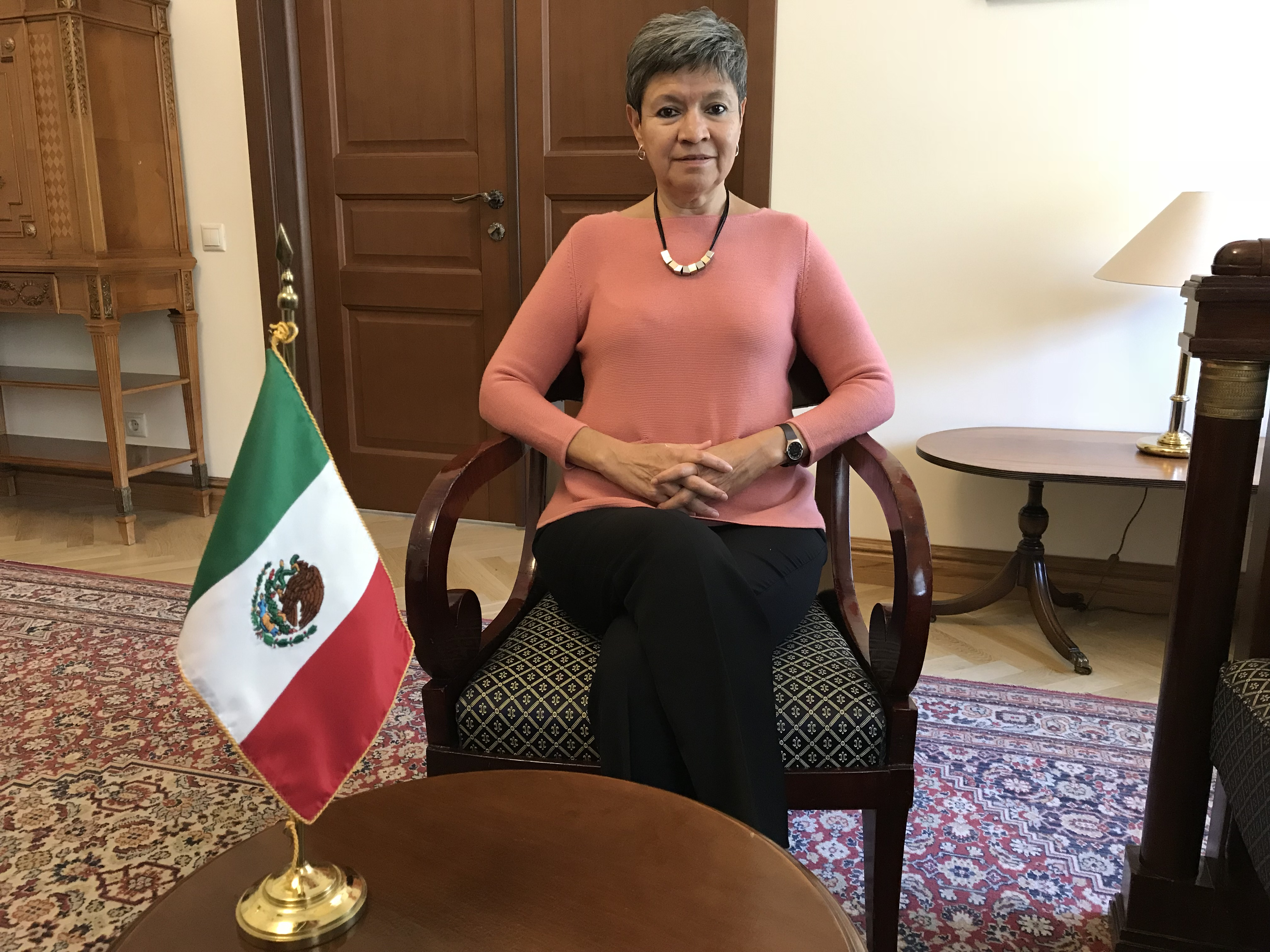
- Born: Norma Bertha Pensado Moreno; May 1, 1958 (age 68); Mexico City, Mexico
- Education: National Autonomous University of Mexico
- Occupation: Diplomat
- Known for: Ambassador of Mexico to Russia
- Awards: Order of the Lion of Finland; Order of the Polar Star (Sweden)

Norma Bertha Pensado Moreno (born May 1, 1958) is a Mexican career diplomat, a member of the Mexican Foreign Service since 1991. She currently serves as Ambassador of Mexico to Denmark. She was previously the first woman to head the Mexican embassy in Russia.

== Education ==
Norma Pensado Moreno earned a licentiate in Economics from the National Autonomous University of Mexico's Faculty of Economics in 1981 with the thesis América Latina: Un difícil camino a la integración (Latin America: A Difficult Road to Integration).

She has taken courses on foreign policy and diplomacy, such as "Globalization and the New Global Economy" at the Universities of Oxford, Yale, and Stanford, and "Políticas de Comercio Exterior en América Latina" (Foreign Trade Policies in Latin America) from ECLAC/UNCTAD/OAS/UNDP/ILPES.

She is an associate member of the Mexican Council on Foreign Relations (COMEXI).

== Diplomatic career ==
Pensado Moreno joined the Mexican Foreign Service in September 1991. At the Secretariat of Foreign Affairs, she has served as Director of Academic Exchange and Scholarships in the General Directorate of Cultural Affairs (1992–1994), Director General for Europe (2004–2006), and Director General for Latin America and the Caribbean (2011–2012). In 2012, she was appointed Undersecretary for Latin America and the Caribbean by President Felipe Calderón.

Abroad, she has served as Alternate Representative in the Permanent Mission of Mexico to the United Nations based in Vienna (1994–1997), as Counselor in the Delegation of Mexico to the Organisation for Economic Co-operation and Development (OECD) in Paris (1998–2001), and as Head of Chancery at the Embassy of Mexico in Sweden (2001–2004).

In 2006 she rose to the rank of ambassador and was appointed Extraordinary and Plenipotentiary Ambassador to the Kingdom of Sweden, concurrently to the Republics of Latvia and Lithuania (2006–2011). Subsequently, she was appointed Ambassador to the Republic of Finland, concurrently to the Republic of Estonia (2013–2017). Since 2017 she has served as Ambassador Extraordinary and Plenipotentiary to the Russian Federation, concurrently to the Republics of Armenia and Belarus.

In 2018 she headed the assistance and consular protection actions of Mexicans during the 2018 FIFA World Cup, whose result and good performance was recognized by the Permanent Commission of the Congress of the Union of Mexico. She has represented her country at numerous conferences and international meetings within the framework of the United Nations, the OECD, and organizations of the Inter-American System.

She has participated in various forums, both in Mexico and in European and Latin American countries, as a lecturer and panelist on international affairs, foreign policy in Mexico, and gender issues.

== Awards and recognitions ==
- Decoration "Servicio Exterior Mexicano – 25 años" (Mexican Foreign Service – 25 Years) from the Secretariat of Foreign Affairs
- Commander Grand Cross of the Order of the Polar Star from the King of Sweden
- Commander Grand Cross of the Order of the Lion of Finland from the Republic of Finland

== Selected publications ==
- "Participación Ciudadana: algunos elementos sobre el caso de Finlandia" in Mecanismos de Participación Ciudadana: una experiencia global, coordinated by Gerardo Romero Altamirano and Gema M. Morales Martínez. Electoral Institute of the State of Querétaro, Tirant lo Blanch, Mexico City.
- Concept and coordination of the DVD documentary Mexico and Finland: 80 Years of Friendship. Embassy of Mexico to Finland, Ministry of Foreign Affairs of Finland. Helsinki, September 2006.
