= List of ambassadors of Qatar to China =

Ambassador of Qatar to China
- Incumbent; Mohamed Al-Dehaimi since July 26, 2019
- Inaugural holder: Mohammed Sa'ad al-Fahid
- Formation: August 23, 1989

The Qatari ambassador in Beijing is the official representative of the Government in Doha to the Government of the People's Republic of China who also serves as the official representative to the Government of the Democratic People's Republic of Korea. The governments in Doha and Beijing established diplomatic relations in July 1988.

== List of representatives ==
Diplomatic agrément/Diplomatic accreditation	Ambassador	Observations	List of prime ministers of Qatar	Premier of the People's Republic of China	Term end
August 23, 1989	Mohammed Sa'ad al-Fahid	Mohammed Sa'ad al-Fahid, first ambassador of the State of Qatar to China.	Khalifa bin Hamad Al Thani	Li Peng	
January 1, 1990	Taofeite Halide		Khalifa bin Hamad Al Thani	Li Peng	
December 27, 1995	Mohammed Abdul-Ghani	On December 27, 1995, he was accredited.	Hamad bin Khalifa Al Thani	Li Peng	
December 3, 1999	Saleh Abdulla Al-Bouanin		Abdullah bin Khalifa Al Thani	Zhu Rongji	
December 28, 2005	Abdulla Abdulrahman Al Muftah		Abdullah bin Khalifa Al Thani	Wen Jiabao	
March 1, 2012	Hamad M Al-Khalifa		Hamad bin Jassim bin Jaber Al Thani	Wen Jiabao	
March 2, 2015	Salmeen Al Mansouri	Emiri Decision No 144 for 2013 appointing Sultan Salmeen Saeed al-Mansouri as ambassador of Qatar to China.	Abdullah bin Nasser bin Khalifa Al Thani	Li Keqiang	
July 26, 2019	Mohamed Al-Dehaimi		Abdullah bin Nasser bin Khalifa Al Thani (until January 28, 2020) Khalid bin Khalifa bin Abdul Aziz Al Thani (until March 7, 2023) Mohammed bin Abdulrahman bin Jassim Al Thani	Li Keqiang (until March 11, 2023) Li Qiang	
