= List of ambassadors to Colombia =

The following table is a List of ambassadors to Colombia that contains the names of the accredited ambassadors to the Republic of Colombia as of 10 June 2014. Note that not all ambassadors reside in Colombia, as some are dually accredited to Colombia in a Non-Resident capacity. Also of note is that some ambassadors, although appointed and accredited by the sending country, have not yet presented their Letters of Credence to the President of Colombia or his representative.

== Current ambassadors to Colombia ==
Order	Sending country	Presentation of credentials	Location of embassy	Ambassador	Ref
	Afghanistan	No representative since Embassy of Afghanistan, Washington, D.C. closed in March 2022			
	Albania	17 November 2009	Buenos Aires, Argentina	Rezar Bregu	
8	Algeria	9 February 2011	Bogotá, Colombia	Mohamed Ziane Hasseni	
19	Argentina	19 July 2012	Bogotá, Colombia	Celso Alejandro Jaque	
	Australia	4 December 2012	Santiago, Chile	Timothy Kane	
	Austria	11 June 2014	Lima, Peru	Andreas Rendl	
	Azerbaijan	30 August 2011	Mexico City, Mexico	Ilgar Yusif oglu Mukhtarov	
53	Azerbaijan	21 March 2014	Bogotá, Colombia	Ramil Farzaliyev ^{[a]}	
	Bahamas	30 August 2011	Washington, DC, United States	Cornelius Alvin Smith	
	Bangladesh	30 August 2011	Washington, DC, United States	Akramul Qader	
	Barbados		Caracas, Venezuela	Sandra Loarraine Phillips	
9	Belgium	9 February 2011	Bogotá, Colombia	Sadi Paul Brancart	
	Belize		Mexico City, Mexico	Oliver Darien del Cid	
13	Bolivia	24 May 2011	Bogotá, Colombia	Mario Carvajal Lozano	
37	Brazil	7 October 2013	Bogotá, Colombia	María Elisa Berenguer	
	Brunei	15 December 2011	New York City, United States	Latif Tuah	
	Bulgaria		Brasília, Brazil	Chavdar Nikolov	
43	Canada	11 June 2014	Bogotá, Colombia	Carmen Sylvain	
55	Chile	30 April 2009	Bogotá, Colombia	Ricardo Gustavo Rojas González ^{[b]}	
15	China	25 October 2011	Bogotá, Colombia	Wang Xiaoyuan	
18	Costa Rica	23 March 2012	Bogotá, Colombia	Circe Milena Villanueva Monge	
	Côte d'Ivoire		Brasília, Brazil	Aka Amon Kassi Sylvestre	
	Croatia	4 December 2012	Brasília, Brazil	Drago Štambuk	
5	Cuba	3 February 2010	Bogotá, Colombia	Jorge Iván Mora Godoy	
	Cyprus	6 July 2010	Mexico City, Mexico	Vasilios Philippou	
	Czech Republic	15 December 2011	Lima, Peru	Vladimír Eisenbruk	
52	Czech Republic	11 November 2013	Bogotá, Colombia	Imrich Kliment ^{[a]}	
	Denmark	6 July 2010	Brasília, Brazil	Svend Roed Nielsen	
34	Dominican Republic	7 October 2013	Bogotá, Colombia	Briunny Garabito Segura	
7	Ecuador	14 January 2011	Bogotá, Colombia	César Raúl Enrique Vallejo Corral	
16	Egypt	25 October 2011	Bogotá, Colombia	Tarek Mahmoud el-Kouny	
42	El Salvador	20 March 2014	Bogotá, Colombia	Marcos Gregorio Sánchez Trejo	
	Equatorial Guinea	3 November 2004	Brasília, Brazil	Teodoro Biyogo Nsué Okomo	
	Fiji		Brasília, Brazil	Cama Tuiloma	
	Finland	15 December 2011	Lima, Peru	Juha Ilari Virtanen	
51	Finland	17 September 2013	Bogotá, Colombia	Hannu Ripatti ^{[a]}	
38	France	7 October 2013	Bogotá, Colombia	Jean-Marc Laforêt	
	Georgia	19 July 2012	Brasília, Brazil	Otar Berdzenishvili	
25	Germany	19 September 2012	Bogotá, Colombia	Günter Rudolf Knieß	
	Ghana		Brasília, Brazil	Wallace Agbi Gbedemah	
	Greece	27 February 2013	Caracas, Venezuela	Anastassios Petrovas	
	Grenada		Caracas, Venezuela	George MacLeish	
21	Guatemala	19 September 2012	Bogotá, Colombia	Manilo Fernando Sesenna Olivero	
	Guinea		Brasília, Brazil	Mohamed Youla	
	Guinea-Bissau		Brasília, Brazil	Eugênia Pereira Saldanha Araújo	
	Guyana		Caracas, Venezuela	Geoffrey da Silva	
1	Holy See	18 June 2013	Bogotá, Colombia	Ettore Balestrero	
35	Honduras	7 October 2013	Bogotá, Colombia	Francisco Ramón Zepeda Andino	
	Hungary	30 November 2006	Buenos Aires, Argentina	Pál Varga Koritár	
	Iceland	18 March 2014	Ottawa, Canada	Þórður Ægir Óskarsson	
45	India	11 June 2014	Bogotá, Colombia	Prabhat Kumar	
28	Indonesia	4 December 2012	Bogotá, Colombia	Trie Edi Mulyani	
54	Iran	27 March 2014	Bogotá, Colombia	Manouchehr Sobhani Firouzabad ^{[a]}	
	Ireland	13 January 2014	Mexico City, Mexico	Sonya Hyland	
14	Israel	30 August 2011	Bogotá, Colombia	Yoed Magen	
24	Italy	19 September 2012	Bogotá, Colombia	Gianni Bardini	
	Jamaica	13 January 2014	Caracas, Venezuela	Sharon Rosemarie Weber	
48	Jamaica	6 October 1993	Bogotá, Colombia	Elaine Gene Towsend ^{[a]}	
27	Japan	4 December 2012	Bogotá, Colombia	Kazuo Watanabe	
	Kazakhstan		Havana, Cuba	Madilna B. Jarbussynova	
	Kenya	19 July 2012	Brasília, Brazil	Kirimi Peter Kaberia	
	Kuwait	27 February 2013	Caracas, Venezuela	Muhammad Marzouk al-Shabo	
50	Lebanon	3 August 2012	Bogotá, Colombia	Georges Abou Zeid ^{[a]}	
	Libya		Caracas, Venezuela	Ali al-Muntasser Karym Farfar	
	Malaysia	19 July 2012	Lima, Peru	Datuk Ayauf bin Bachi	
4	Sovereign Military Order of Malta	3 February 2010	Bogotá, Colombia	Antonio Tarelli	
40	Mexico	13 January 2014	Bogotá, Colombia	Arnulfo Valdivia Machuca	
2	Morocco	23 January 2009	Bogotá, Colombia	Noureddine Khalifa	
	Namibia	19 July 2012	Brasília, Brazil	Lineekela Josephat Mboti	
22	Netherlands	19 September 2012	Bogotá, Colombia	Robert Louis Raimund Maire van Embden	
	New Zealand	4 December 2012	Santiago, Chile	John E. Capper	
12	Nicaragua	24 May 2011	Bogotá, Colombia	Julio José Calero Reyes	
	Nigeria	18 March 2014	Caracas, Venezuela	Rabiu Dagari	
	North Korea	6 July 2010	Brasília, Brazil	Ri Hwa-gun	
32	Norway	4 December 2012	Bogotá, Colombia	Lars Vaagen	
	Oman	18 March 2014	New York City, United States	Lyutha Sultan al-Mughairy	
	Pakistan		Brasília, Brazil	Nasrullah Khan	
46	Palestine	27 May 2014	Bogotá, Colombia	Rauf Najib al-Malki ^{[b]}	
3	Panama	1 September 2009	Bogotá, Colombia	Ricardo Rogelio Anguizola Morales	
33	Paraguay	18 June 2013	Bogotá, Colombia	Ricardo Scavone Yegros	
36	Peru	7 October 2013	Bogotá, Colombia	Néstor Francisco Popolizio Bardales	
	Philippines	6 July 2010	Brasília, Brazil	Eva Galinato Betita	
26	Poland	4 December 2012	Bogotá, Colombia	Maciej Ziętara	
31	Portugal	11 April 2013	Bogotá, Colombia	João Manuel Mendes Ribeiro de Almeida	
	Qatar		Caracas, Venezuela	Batal bin Mojab al-Dosari	
49	Romania	9 December 2012	Bogotá, Colombia	Radu Sârbu ^{[a]}	
11	Russia	24 May 2011	Bogotá, Colombia	Pável Artemyevitch Sérgiev	
	San Marino	3 March 2005	Bogotá, Colombia	Pier Arrigo Braschi	
	Serbia	6 July 2010	Brasília, Brazil	Ljubomir Milić	
	Slovakia	4 December 2012	Brasília, Brazil	Milan Cigáň	
	Slovenia	27 February 2013	Brasília, Brazil	Milena Šmit	
	South Africa	7 October 2013	Caracas, Venezuela	Thaninga Pandit Shope-Linney	
10	South Korea	24 May 2011	Bogotá, Colombia	Choo Jong-youn	
41	Spain	13 January 2014	Bogotá, Colombia	Ramón Gandarias Alonso de Celis	
	Sri Lanka		New York City, United States	Palitha Tikiri Bandara Kohona	
	Sudan		New York City, United States	Daffa-Alla Elhag Ali Osman	
	Suriname	25 June 2008	Caracas, Venezuela	Samuel Pawironadi	
17	Sweden	25 October 2011	Bogotá, Colombia	Marie Louise Andersson de Frutos	
23	Switzerland	19 September 2012	Bogotá, Colombia	Dora Rapold	
	Thailand	13 January 2014	Lima, Peru	Ruengdej Mahasaranond	
	Trinidad and Tobago	13 January 2014	Caracas, Venezuela	Anthony David Edghill	
30	Turkey	27 February 2013	Bogotá, Colombia	Engin Yürur	
	Ukraine		Brasília, Brazil	Rostyslav Volodymyrovytch Tronenko	
39	United Arab Emirates	13 January 2014	Bogotá, Colombia	Mohammed Eissa Alqattam-Zaabi	
29	United Kingdom	23 January 2012	Bogotá, Colombia	Lindsay Redvers Mark Seymour Croisdale-Appleby	
44	United States	1 June 2022	Bogotá, Colombia	Francisco Palmieri	
20	Uruguay	19 September 2012	Bogotá, Colombia	Duncan Boris Crocí de Mula	
6	Venezuela	14 January 2011	Bogotá, Colombia	Iván Guillermo Rincón Urdaneta	
	Vietnam	18 March 2014	Caracas, Venezuela	Ngô Tiến Dũng	
47	European Union	2021	Bogotá, Colombia	Giles Bertrand	

== See also ==
- List of ambassadors of Colombia
- List of diplomatic missions of Colombia
- List of diplomatic missions in Colombia
