= Martine Schommer =

Luxembourgish diplomat

Martine Schommer (born 13 July 1961) is a Luxembourgish diplomat who has served as Ambassador to the People's Republic of China and to the Federal Republic of Germany. She has also represented Luxembourg as Permanent Representative to the European Union. Since September 2017, she has been Luxembourg's Permanent Representative to the OECD and Permanent Delegate to UNESCO.

== Biography ==
Born in Luxembourg City on 13 July 1961, after completing her school education in Luxembourg, Martine Schommer studied Russian and Chinese at the Institut national des langues et civilisations orientales in Paris.

In February 1987 she joined Luxembourg's Ministry of Foreign Affairs. In 1991, in connection with Luxembourg's presidency of the European Union, she was responsible for managing the Uruguay Round international trade negotiations. Thereafter she was a member of Luxembourg's Permanent Delegation to the European Union where she dealt with foreign relations and inter-institutional matters.

After an extended period as diplomatic advisor to the Prime Minister of Luxembourg, in August 1998, she was appointed Ambassador to the Popular Republic of China with co-accreditation to Mongolia, Singapore and Viet Nam, serving until July 2002.

Returning to Luxembourg, she was then appointed Director of Political Affairs at the foreign ministry until she became Luxembourg's Permanent Representative to the European Union (2004–2008). In 2008, she was appointed ambassador to Germany. Since September 2017, she has been Luxembourg's Permanent Representative to the OECD and Permanent Delegate to UNESCO.

Martine Schommer is married to Jean-Jacques Welfring (married 2011), also a career diplomat.
