= Edith Mutale =

Zambian ambassador

Rev. Edith Mutale was the Zambian Ambassador to Denmark, Finland, Iceland, Norway, Sweden, Estonia, Latvia and Lithuania. from 2012 to 2017.

Before becoming ambassador, she was the spiritual leader of the Redeemed Methodist Church.
