= Brazil–Japan relations =

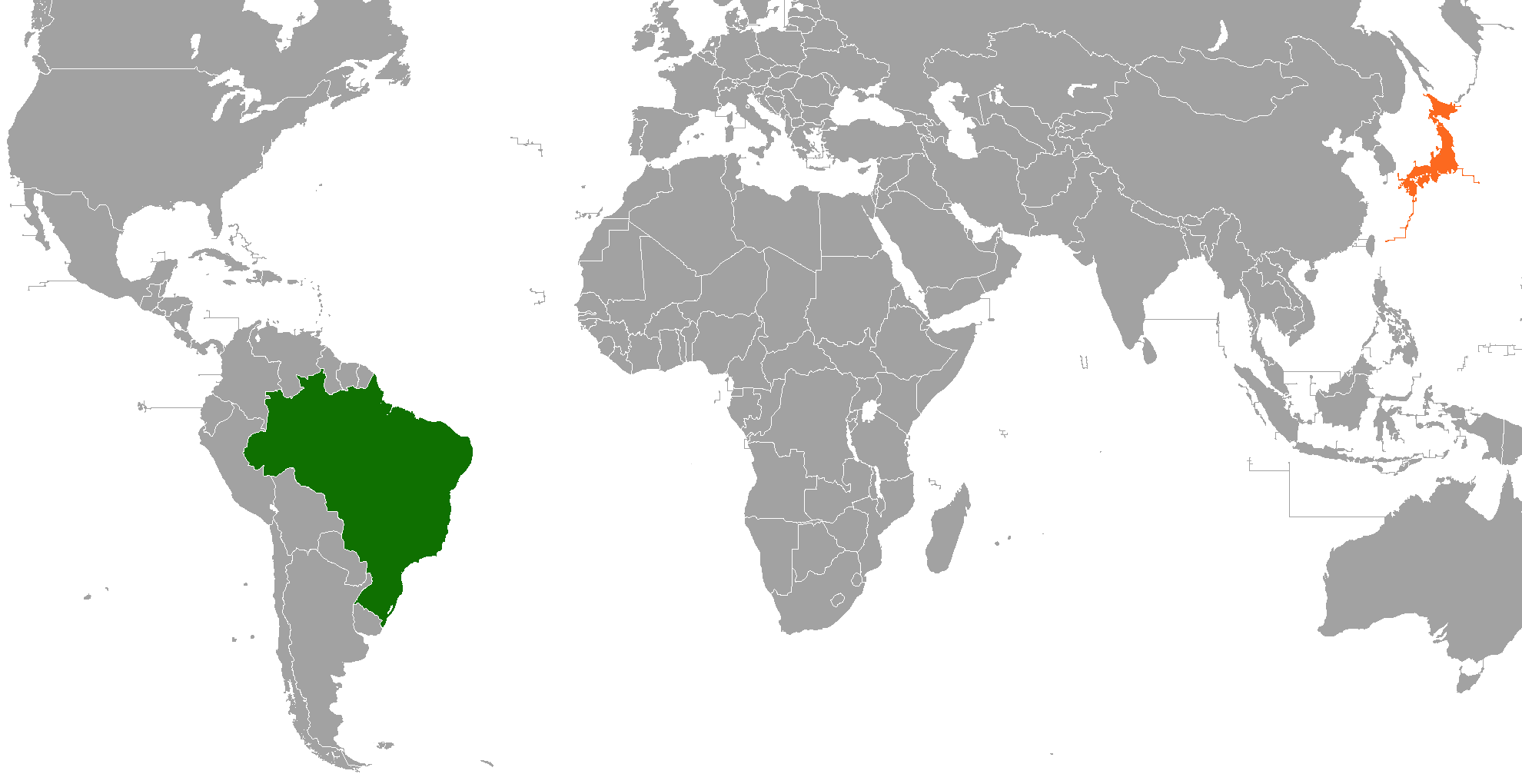
- Brazil: Japan

Diplomatic mission
- Brazilian embassy, Tokyo: Japanese embassy, Brasilia

Brazil–Japan relations are the current and historical international relations between Brazil and Japan. The diplomatic relations were officially established on 5 November 1895 with the Treaty of Friendship, Commerce and Navigation signed in Paris. Early relations were dominated by the Japanese immigration issues. The total number of Japanese immigrants reached 190,000 in the pre-World War II period. Now, more than 2 million Brazilians are of Japanese descent, making Brazil host to the largest Japanese community outside Japan. At the same time, Japan is host to the third largest Brazilian population, most being of Japanese origin. Both nations are members of the G4 nations, G20 and World Trade Organization.

== History ==
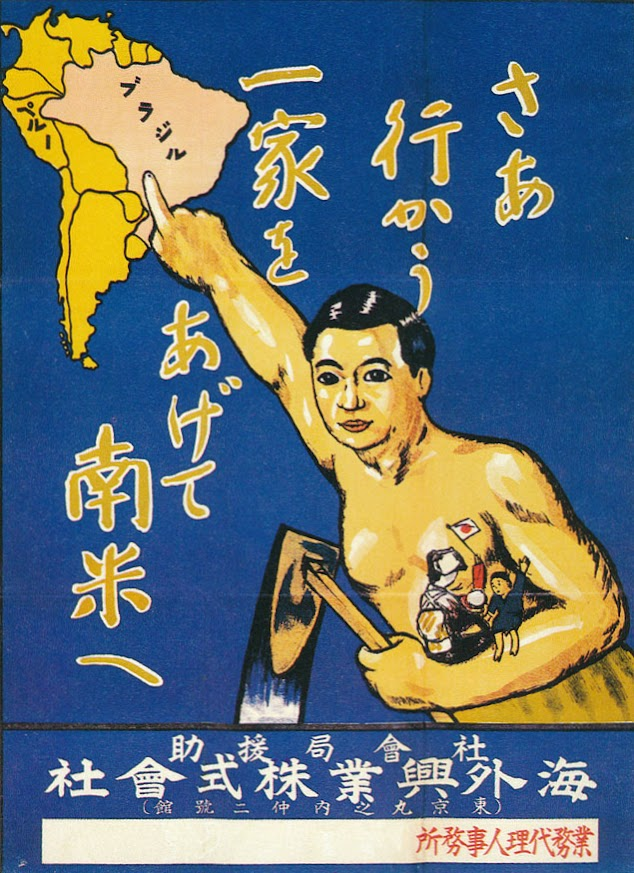
A poster used in Japan to attract immigrants to Brazil. It reads: "Let's go to South America with families."

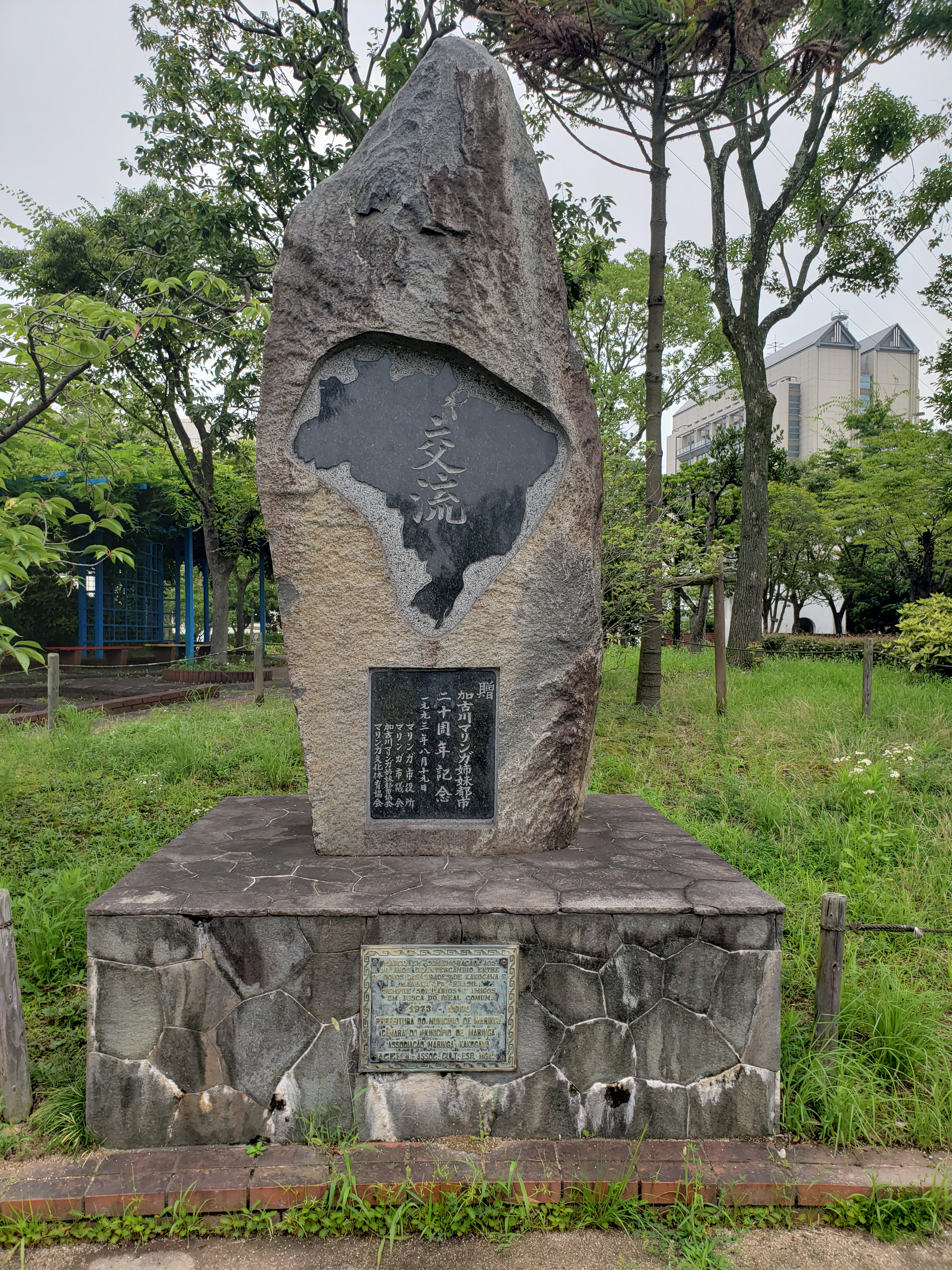
Kakogawa-Maringá Friendship City 20th Anniversary Monument

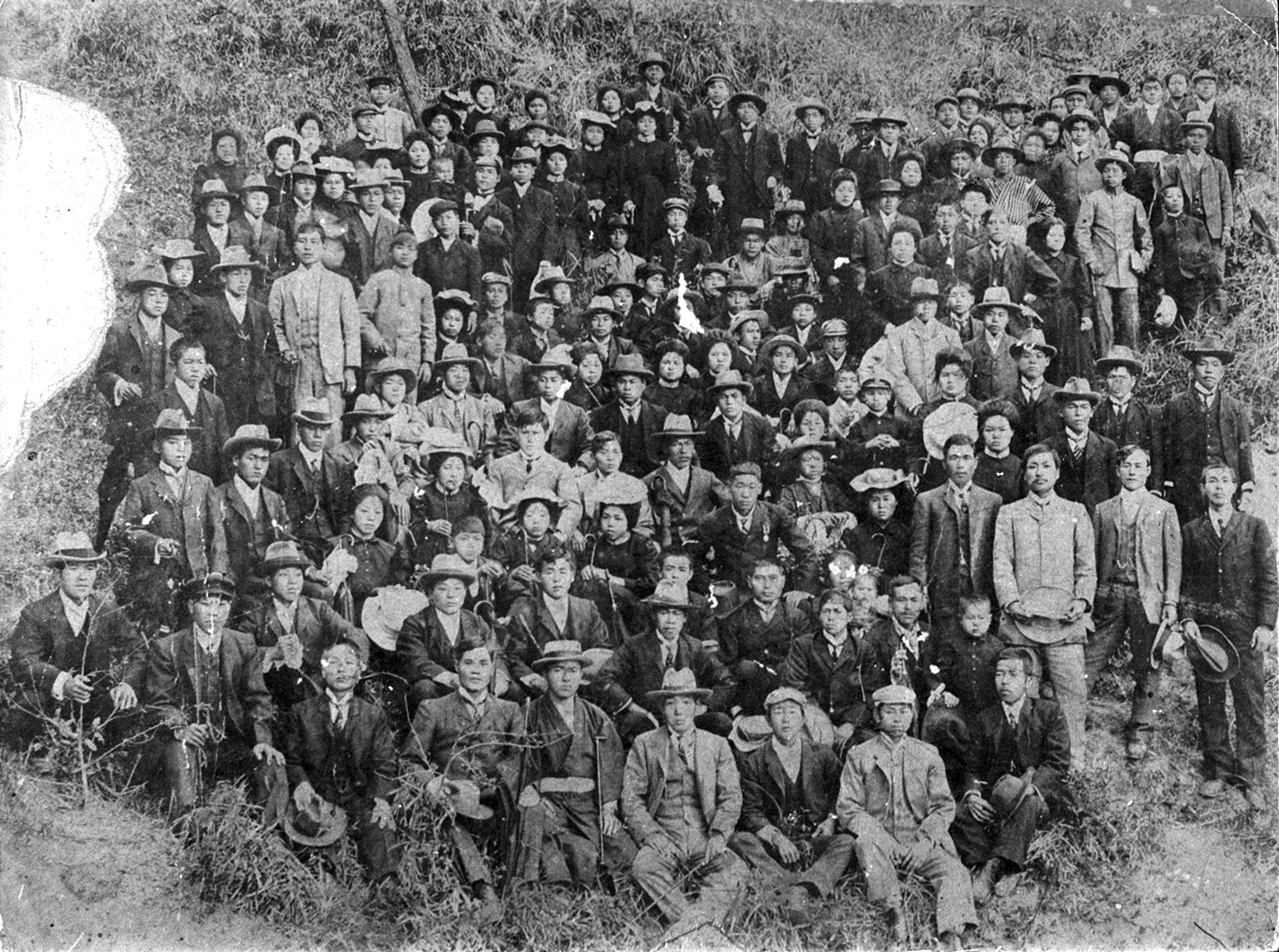
Passengers of the Kasato Maru, in Japan just a few days before traveling to Brazil.

First contact between Brazil and Japan was through Portuguese explorers who first arrived to Japan in 1543 and got foreign control of the city of Nagasaki; 43 years after Portugal founded its first colonies in Brazil. From 1543 to 1638, Portugal traded with Japan with stopovers in Brazil along the way, known as the Nanban trade. Many Japanese products were sold in Brazil and, during this time period, Portuguese traders sold Japanese slaves in Brazil. By 1638, Portuguese traders were no longer allowed to trade in Japan, however, trade continued between the Portuguese colony in Macau. Soon afterwards, Japan entered a period of isolation.

In September 1822, Brazil obtained its independence from Portugal. In October 1868, Japan entered the Meiji period and began fostering diplomatic relations with several nations, after centuries of isolation. In 1895, Brazil and Japan signed a Treaty of Friendship, Commerce and Navigation. In 1897, diplomatic missions were opened in each nations capitals, respectively. In June 1908, a ship from Japan carrying 790 Japanese migrants arrived to Brazil aboard the Kasato Maru; the first of many Japanese migrants to arrive to Brazil. Between 1908 and 1941, over 190,000 Japanese immigrated to Brazil searching for better opportunities in the South American nation.

During World War II, Brazil broke diplomatic relations with Japan in January 1942 over the Attack on Pearl Harbor and allied itself with the Allies. As a result, thousands of families of Japanese origin in Brazil were arrested or deported as potential spies or collaborators. The Brazilian government also closed hundreds of Japanese schools, seized communications equipment and forced the relocation of Japanese who lived close to the coastline. Many in the Japanese-Brazilian community were tortured, and were forced to step on an image of Emperor Hirohito, who was then considered divine in Japan. Diplomatic relations between both nations were restored in 1952. Between 1953 and 1973, an additional 55,000 Japanese immigrated to Brazil.

In July 1959, Prime Minister Nobusuke Kishi became the first Japanese head of state to visit Brazil. In September 1976, Brazilian President Ernesto Geisel paid an official visit to Japan. Japanese Emperor Akihito visited Brazil in 1997, his third visit to the country (his first and second visit were as Crown Prince in 1967 and 1978, respectively).

In 1990, the Japanese government authorized the legal entry of Japanese and their descendants until the third generation in Japan. Since then, close to 300,000 Japanese-Brazilians have migrated to Japan and form the third-largest immigrant group in Japan, after Chinese and Koreans. In recent years, however, several have returned to Brazil after saving money in Japan to purchase property in Brazil and in 2016, the Brazilian-Japanese community totaled 180,000 members.

In 2015, both nations celebrated 120 years of diplomatic relations.

In June 2019, Brazilian President Jair Bolsonaro took part in G20 summit in Osaka, Japan. On 22 October 2019, President Jair Bolsonaro attended the enthronement ceremony of Japanese Emperor Naruhito at the Imperial Palace in Japanese capital Tokyo.

In March 2025, both countries announced a 5-year-plan to further strengthen economic and defensive ties together as a result of U.S president Donald Trump's tariffs.

== High-level visits ==
=== Japan to Brazil ===
Year	Name
2003	Ambassador on Special Mission Takami Eto (Inaugural Ceremony of President Lula)
2004	Prime Minister Junichiro Koizumi
2006	Minister for Agriculture, Forestry and Fisheries Shoichi Nakagawa Minister for Internal Affairs and Communications Heizo Takenaka
2007	Minister for Agriculture, Forestry and Fisheries Toshikatsu Matsuoka Minister for Internal Affairs and Communications Yoshihide Suga Minister for Foreign Affairs Taro Aso
2008	Minister for Agriculture, Forestry and Fisheries Masatoshi Wakabahashi His Imperial Highness Crown Prince (Japan-Brazil Year of Exchange/Centennial of Japanese Immigration to Brazil) Japan-Brazil Parliamentary League Minister for Economy, Trade and Industry Akira Amari
2010	Former Prime Minister Taro Aso
2011	Ambassador on Special Mission Taro Aso (Inaugural Ceremony of President Rousseff) Minister for Foreign Affairs Takeaki Matsumoto
2012	State Minister for National Policy Motohisa Furukawa Minister for Foreign Affairs Koichiro Gemba
2013	Minister for Economy, Trade and Industry Toshimitsu Motegi Minister for Internal Affairs and Communications Yoshitaka Shindo Minister for Foreign Affairs Fumio Kishida
2014	Her Imperial Highness Takamado Prime Minister Shinzo Abe
2015	Their Imperial Highnesses Prince and Princess Akishino (120th anniversary of the establishment of diplomatic relations between Japan and Brazil)
2016	Prime Minister Shinzo Abe (Closing Ceremony for the Rio de Janeiro Olympic Games)
2017	Deputy Prime Minister Taro Aso (Opening Ceremony for Japan House São Paulo)
2018	His Imperial Highness Crown Prince (8th World Water Forum)
2018	Minister for Foreign Affairs Taro Kono
2018	Her Imperial Highness Princess Mako of Akishino (110th Anniversary of the Japanese immigration)
2019	Ambassador on Special Mission Taimei Yamaguchi (Inaugural Ceremony of President Bolsonaro)
2025	Her Imperial Highness Princess Kako of Akishino (130th anniversary of the establishment of diplomatic relations between Japan and Brazil)

=== Brazil to Japan ===
Year	Name
2002	Foreign Minister Celso Lafer
2004	Foreign Minister Celso Amorim
2005	President Luiz Inacio Lula da Silva Foreign Minister Celso Amorim Finance Minister Antonio Palocci Agriculture and Supply Minister Roberto Rodrigues Development, Industry and Foreign Trade Minister Luis Furlan Mines and Energy Minister Dilma Rousseff Tourism Minister Walfrido Guia Central Bank President Hennque Meirelles
2006	Foreign Minister Celso Amorim Development, Industry and Foreign Trade Minister Luis Furlan Communications Minister Helio Costa Education Minister Fernando Haddad
2007	Agriculture and Supply Minister Luis Carlos Guedes Pinto Tourism Minister Marta Suplicy
2008	Chamber of Deputies President Arlindo Chinaglia Junior Chief-Minister of the Presidential Staff Office Dilma Vana Rousseff (Japan-Brazil Year of Exchange/Centennial of Japanese Immigration) President Luiz Inacio Lula da Silva Foreign Minister Celso Amorim (outreach meeting of G8 Hokkaido Toyako Summit)
2009	Science and Technology Minister Sérgio Rezende
2010	Social Security Minister Eduardo Gabas Labor Minister Carlos Lupi
2011	Foreign Minister Antônio de Aguiar Patriota
2012	Development, Industry and Foreign Trade Minister Fernando Damata Pimentel National Integration Minister Fernando Bezerra Coelho, Finance Minister Guido Mantega Development, Industry and Foreign Trade Minister Fernando Damata Pimentel
2013	Environmental Minister Izabella Monica Vieira Teixeira Planning, Budget and Management Minister Miriam Belchior
2015	National Integration Minister Gilberto Magalhães Occhi (UN World Conference on Disaster Risk Reduction) Agriculture, Livestock and Supply Minister Kátia Abreu Foreign Minister Mauro Vieira
2016	President Michel Temer Transport Ports and Civil Aviation Minister Maurício Quintella, Agriculture, Livestock and Food Supply Minister Blairo Maggi, Mines and Energy Minister Fernando Bezerra Coelho Filho, Sports Minister Leonardo Picciani
2017	Institutional Security Cabinet Minister, Sérgio Etchegoyen
2018	President of the Senate Eunicio Lopes de Oliveira
2018	Foreign Minister Aloysio Nunes
2019	Agriculture Minister Tereza Cristina (G20 Agriculture Ministers’ Meeting) Central Bank President Roberto Campos Neto (G20 Finance and Central Bank Governors Meeting) Mines and Energy Minister Bento Albuquerque, Environmental Minister Ricardo Salles (G20 Ministerial Meeting on Energy Transitions and Global Environment for Sustainable Growth) President Jair Bolsonaro, Institutional Security Office Minister Augusto Heleno (G20 Osaka Summit 2019) President Jair Bolsonaro, Foreign Minister Ernesto Araújo (Ceremony of Enthronement)
2025	President Luiz Inácio Lula da Silva (State visit)

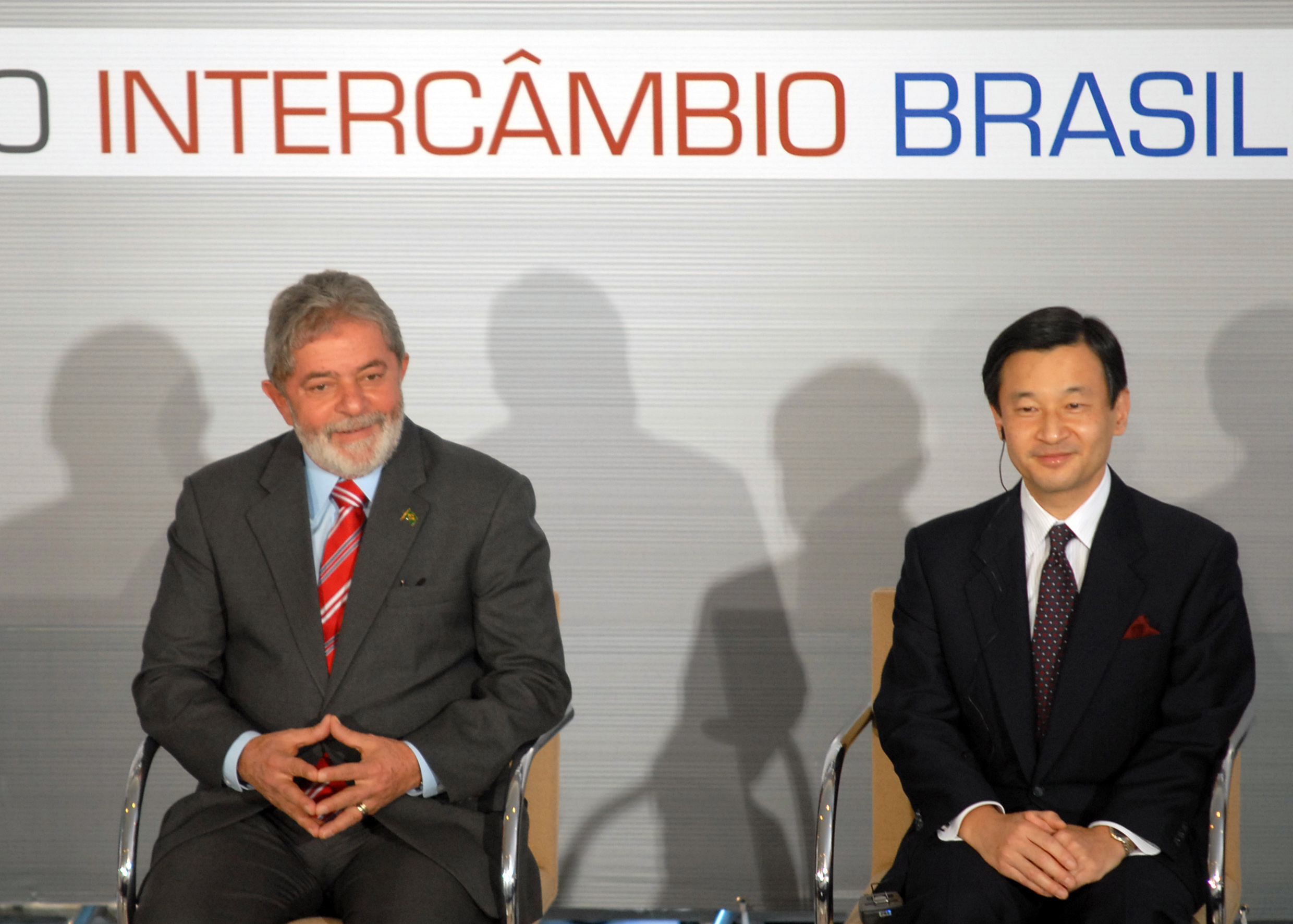
President Lula da Silva and Crown Prince Naruhito in Brasília; June 2008.

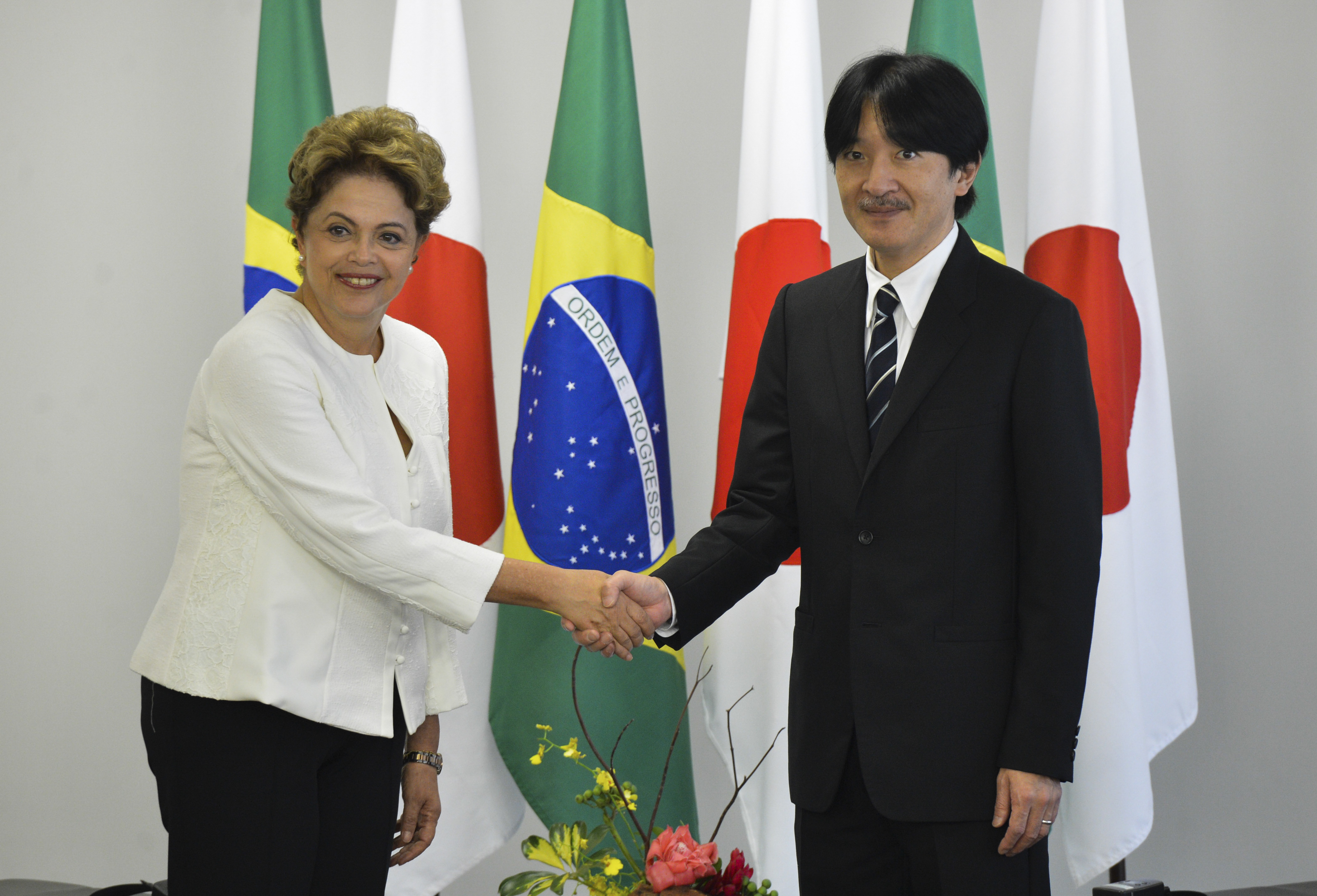
President Dilma Rousseff and Prince Fumihito in Brasília; November 2015.

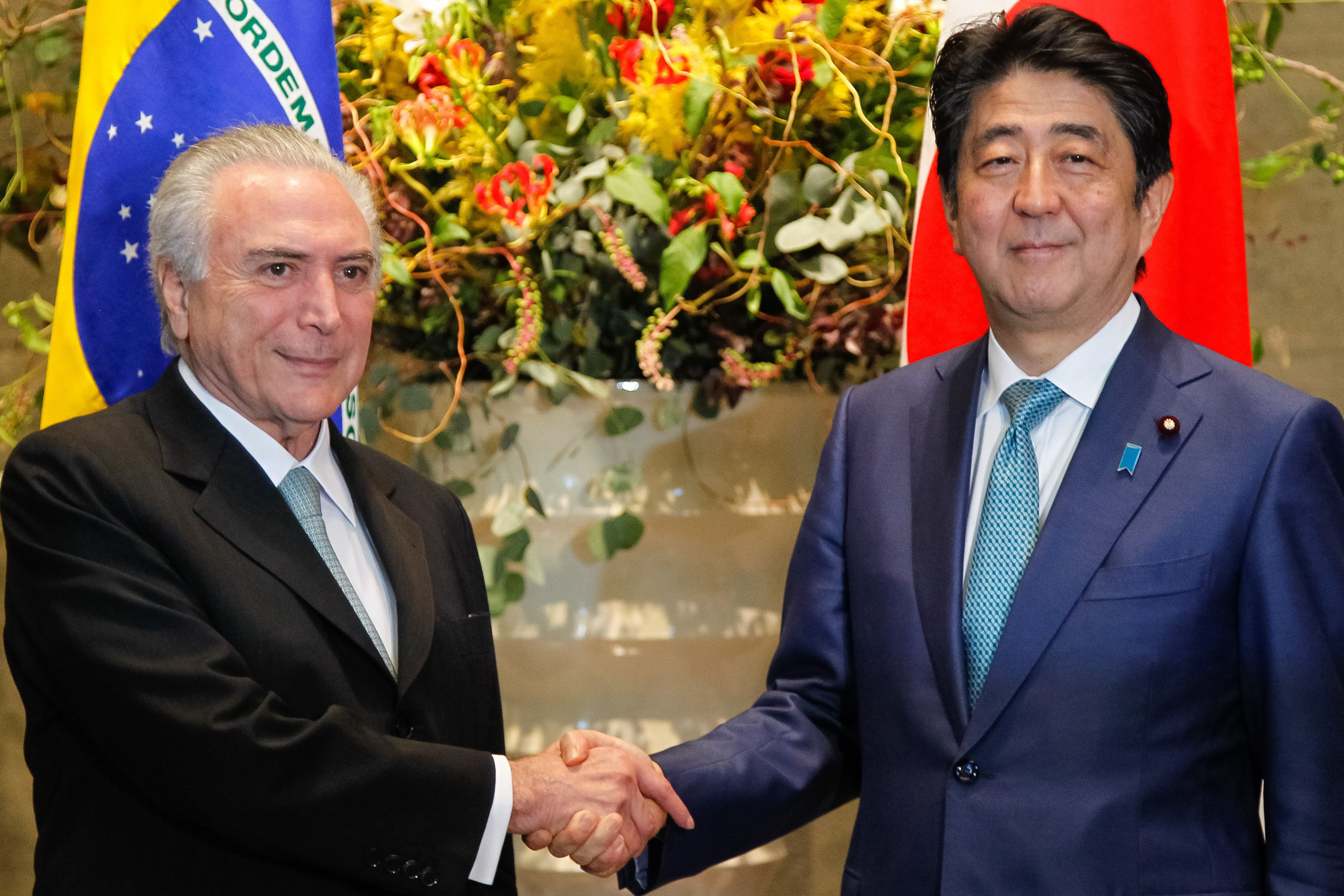
President Michel Temer and Prime Minister Shinzo Abe in Tokyo; October 2016.

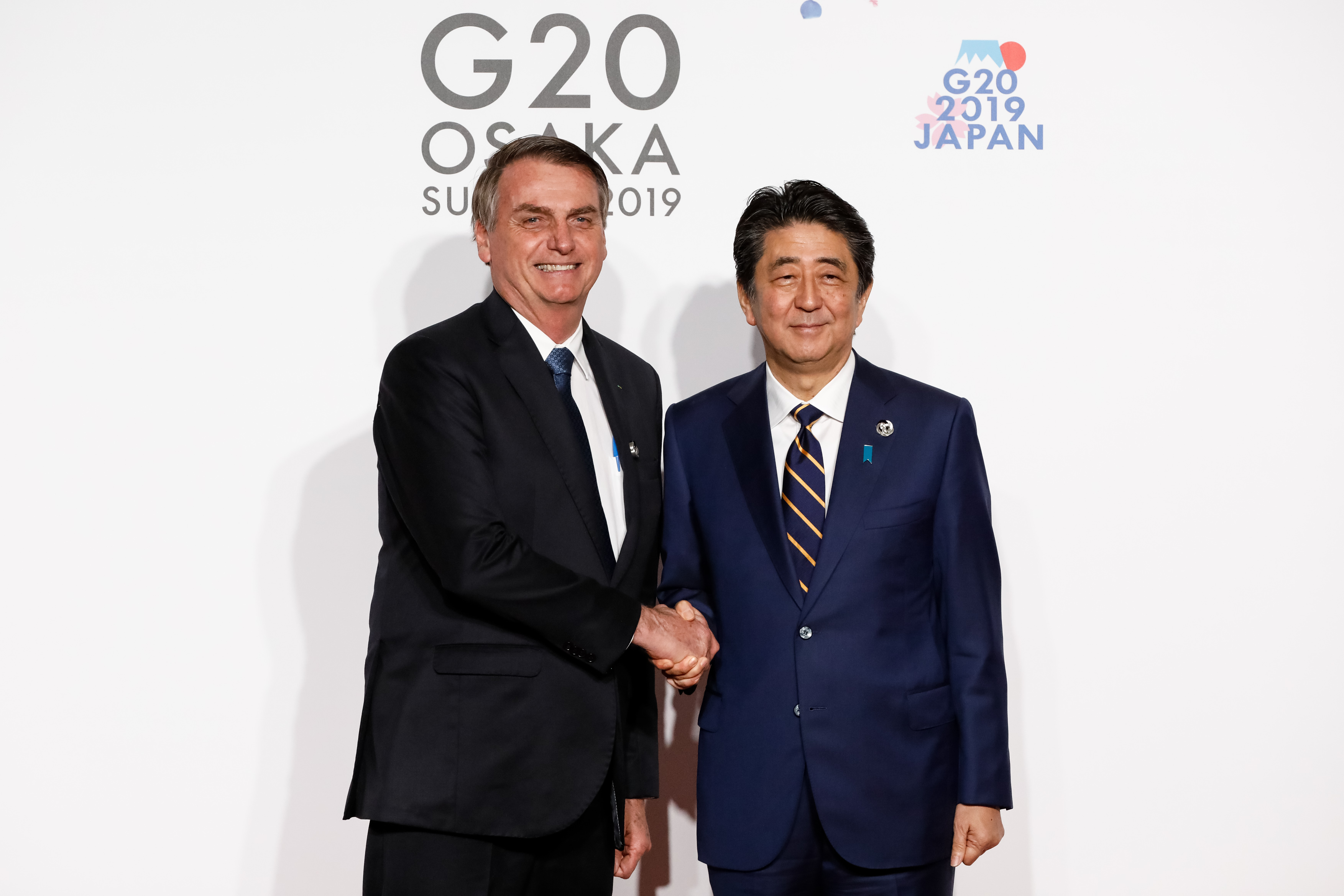
Prime Minister Shinzō Abe and President Jair Bolsonaro in Osaka; June 2019.

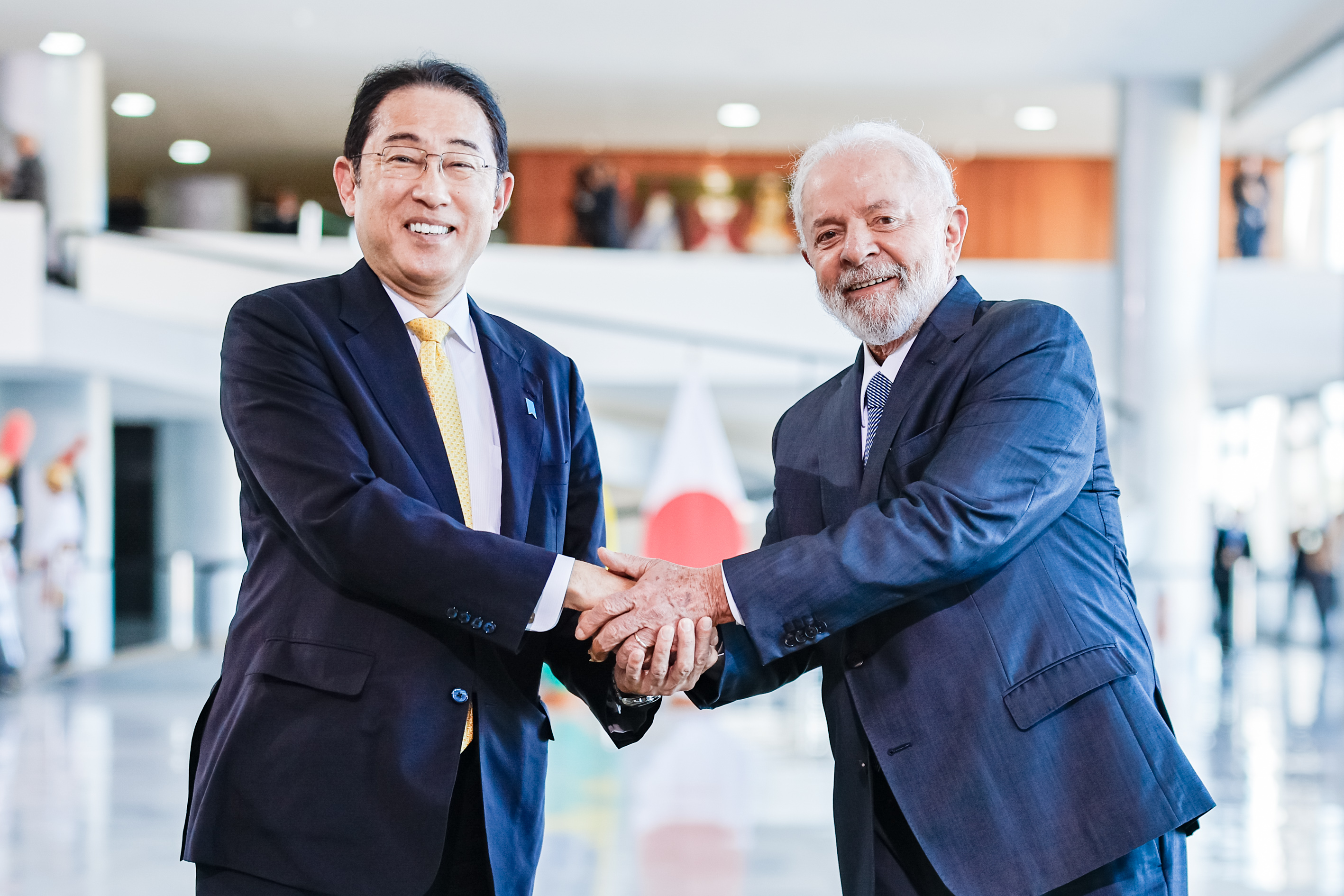
Prime Minister Fumio Kishida and President Lula da Silva in Brasília; May 2024.

== Bilateral relations ==
Brazil and Japan have signed several bilateral agreements/treaties such as an Agreement on Technical Cooperation (1970); Cooperation Agreement in the field of Science and Technology (1984); Joint Program for Revitalization of Economic Relations (2005) and an Agreement on the facilitation of the issuance of multiple-entry Visas for holders of regular passports (2016).

Brazil has been deeply influenced by Japan, on both an economic and humanitarian plateau, through various third parties such as the International Monetary Fund (IMF), the Official Development Assistance (ODA) or the World Health Organization (WHO), and so on. Japan plays a significant role in fostering friendly relations and improving the climate for diplomatic activities. In order to improve relations, frequent ministerial talks have been held between the two countries. In 2014, the Brazilian president Rousseff stated that with this agreement, both countries will be able to expand high-level political and economic contacts. In the 2016 Japan-Brazil Summit Meeting, the Prime Minister stated that Japan attaches importance to its relationship with Brazil as an important partner with which it shares fundamental values such as liberty, democracy, human rights and the rule of law, and with which it also cooperates in international fora. President Temer replied that Brazil has become a new country, and along with emphasizing Brazil's stability on the political and judicial fronts, he expressed his strong expectations of increased investment in Brazil by Japanese companies. The Japan Bank for International Cooperation (JBIC) sets to support open innovation by providing financing to potential companies that contribute to the improvement of Brazil and promote sustainability.

Apart from direct relations with Brazil, Japan is involved in organizations such as Basic Human Needs (BHN) which makes sure people have the necessities of life. They also contribute to the United Nation Commission on Sustainable Development (CSD) working in Rio de Janeiro to implement the Rio Declaration which intends to spur economic development. The Japanese work with the World Health Organization (WHO) in developing countries to educate people about the HIV virus and to help search for a cure. In addition, to support the protection of the Brazilian Amazon rainforest and combat illegal deforestation, the Japan Bank for International Cooperation (JICA) intends to begin phase two of the project that utilizes satellite images using artificial intelligence to predict where illegal deforestation may happen next.

== Trade ==
In 2015, trade between Brazil and Japan totaled US$8 billion. Brazil's main exports to Japan include: iron ore, meat, non-ferrous metal, chemicals, iron and steel. Japan's main exports to Brazil include: automobiles, automotive parts, motors, metal working machinery. In 2016, Japanese direct investment in Brazil totaled US$1.4 billion. That same year, Japan ranked as the third largest trading partner for Brazil in Asia and the seventh in the world. Several well known multinational Japanese companies such as Daiso, Honda, Sony, Toshiba and Toyota (among others) operate in Brazil. In 2007, Japan Airlines began purchasing Embraer made airplanes for their company.

The two countries are negotiating a free trade agreement, with possible announcement until the end of 2019, following the opening of the South American market, Mercosur.

=== History ===
Before World War II, the arrival of the first Japanese immigrants in Brazil opened stores, selling Japanese goods. The Brazil-Japan trade relations through these merchants amounted £35,933 in imports from Japan in 1913. Goods included ceramics, celluloid, toys, toothbrushes, fans, and buttons. Meanwhile, Brazil exported rock crystal and coffee to Japan totaled £2,931. In 1935 Japan sent a trade mission to Brazil that led to a great expansion of trade between 1936 and 1941, which led Brazilian exports to Japan jumped from £158,098 in 1935 to £1,683,106 in 1936 and £2,122,106 in 1937. After world War II, in 1949 a Japanese trade mission visited Brazil and reached an agreement covering US $35 million of foreign trade payments. In the early 1970s, two major trade missions visited Brazil, which led over 150 Japanese companies open branches in Brazil. Therefore, trade increased rapidly, reaching $2.1 billion in 1974. In the late 1970s, the economic relationship came to a new level, moving to large-scale economic cooperative projects based on agreements between the two governments. However, due to Brazilian debt crisis, the progress of closer economic relations slowed down in 1982. After that, the Brazilians of Japanese descents began to come back to Japan for work and education.

=== Trade volume ===
Japan and Brazil share a long term trade relationship. Japan's exports to Brazil have doubled and imports have tripled in decade. The main imports from Brazil is ores slag and ash, cereals, and meat, while the main exports to Brazil are vehicles other than railway, tramway, machinery, and electrical. In 2018, Brazil exported $4.46B to Japan, while Japan exported $4.12B to Brazil. Though the share of Japan in Brazil's exports and Brazilian imports in Japan has dropped about 1.1%, during the last 23 years the exports of Japan to Brazil have increased at an annualized rate of 1.79%. There is much room for improving bilateral trading relationship to get mutual benefits. Japan and Brazil try to increase the trading relationship through various ways including discussion on trade bloc of meat and a specific trade area in 2018.

=== Direct investment ===
Japan's foreign direct investment (FDI) in Brazil is increasing since last century and more than 450 Japanese companies are operating in the Brazilian market. The amount of direct investment from Japan in 2018 was $2,203 million. Japanese investment focuses on the manufacturing sector. Brazil occupies the 10th position in the rank of Japan's FDI. To foster the bilateral trade and FDI, the Brazil-Japan Economic Agreement plays the key role.

== Culture ==
Japanese cultural imports such as anime, video games, food, films, music (J-pop) have had a significant impact in Brazil.

Brazilian jiu-jitsu is a martial art that is a variation of the Japanese martial art jujutsu. It was first developed around 1925 by two Brazilian brothers after one of the brothers was taught Kodokan judo by a Japanese judoka in 1917. BJJ eventually came to be its own defined combat sport through the innovations, practices, and adaptation of Gracie jiu-jitsu and judo, and has become one of the essential martial arts for modern MMA.

== Public perception of relations ==
In 2013, due to the Ministry of Foreign Affairs’ commissions, a private surveying agency in Brazil conducted a public opinion poll on the image of Japan in Brazil. Interviews show that 78% of the respondents believed that Japan and Brazil had “friendly” or “rather friendly” relations. In addition, 84% expected an increase of the importance of Japan for Brazil in the future. With regard to Japan's commitment to global issues, Brazilians recognized such areas as "environmental protection" (42%), "sustainable society" (32%) and "support for disaster prevention" (31%).

A survey published in 2013 by BBC News showed that Brazil is one of the most pro-Japan countries in the world. A dominant negative perception against Brazil on Japan's part could not be proven. According to the survey, 71% of Brazilians view Japan's influence positively and only 10% do otherwise. In Japan, 40% of its people view Brazil's influence positively and 3% negatively. Most respondents didn't have an opinion on how favourable or adverse Brazilian influence was in their country.

== Resident diplomatic missions ==
of Brazil in Japan

- Tokyo (Embassy)
- Tokyo (Consulate-General)
- Hamamatsu (Consulate-General)
- Nagoya (Consulate-General)

of Japan in Brazil

- Brasília (Embassy)
- Curitiba (Consulate-General)
- Manaus (Consulate-General)
- Recife (Consulate-General)
- Rio de Janeiro (Consulate-General)
- São Paulo (Consulate-General)
- Belém (Consulate)
- Porto Alegre (Consular Office)

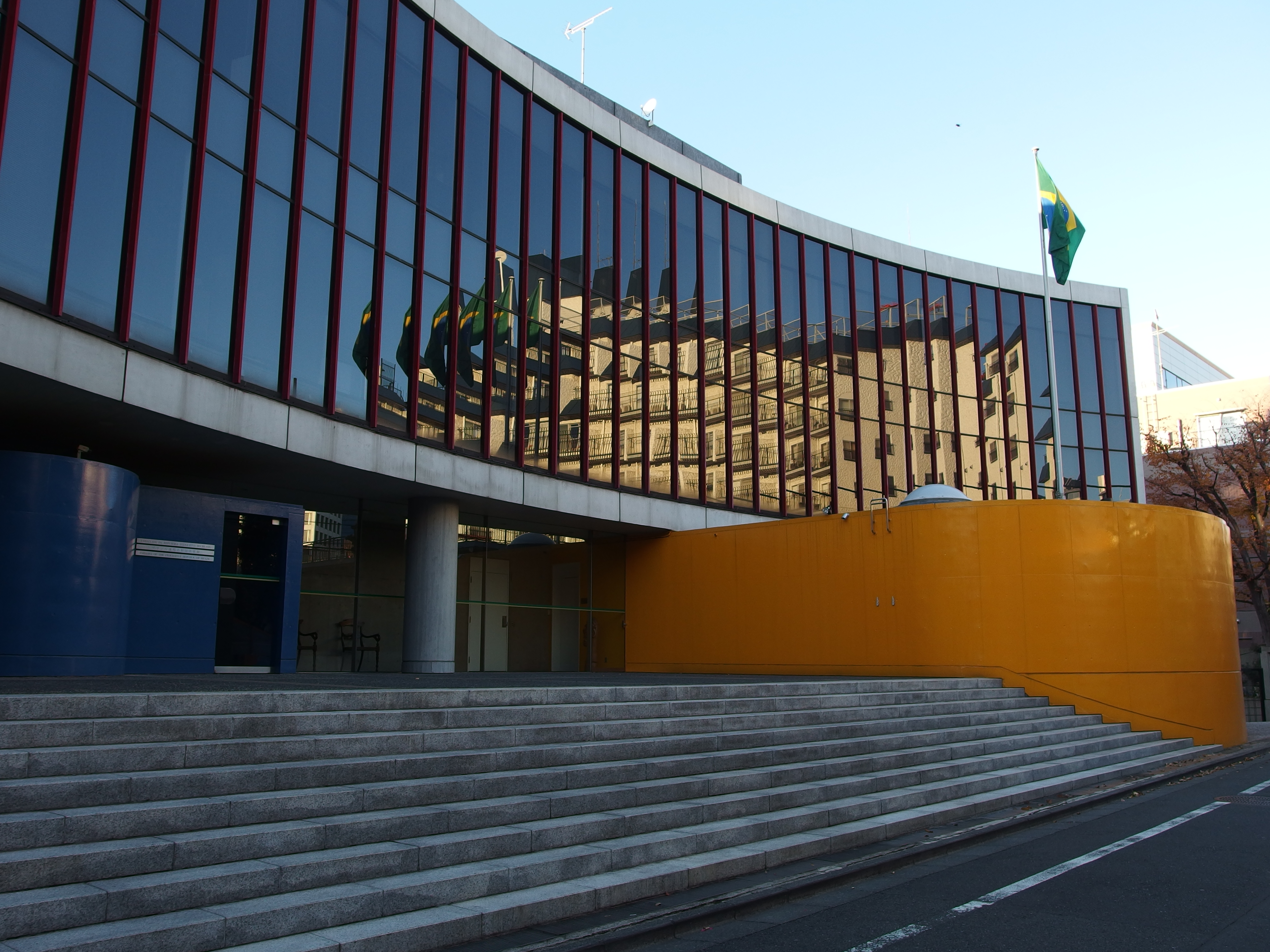
Embassy of Brazil in Tokyo

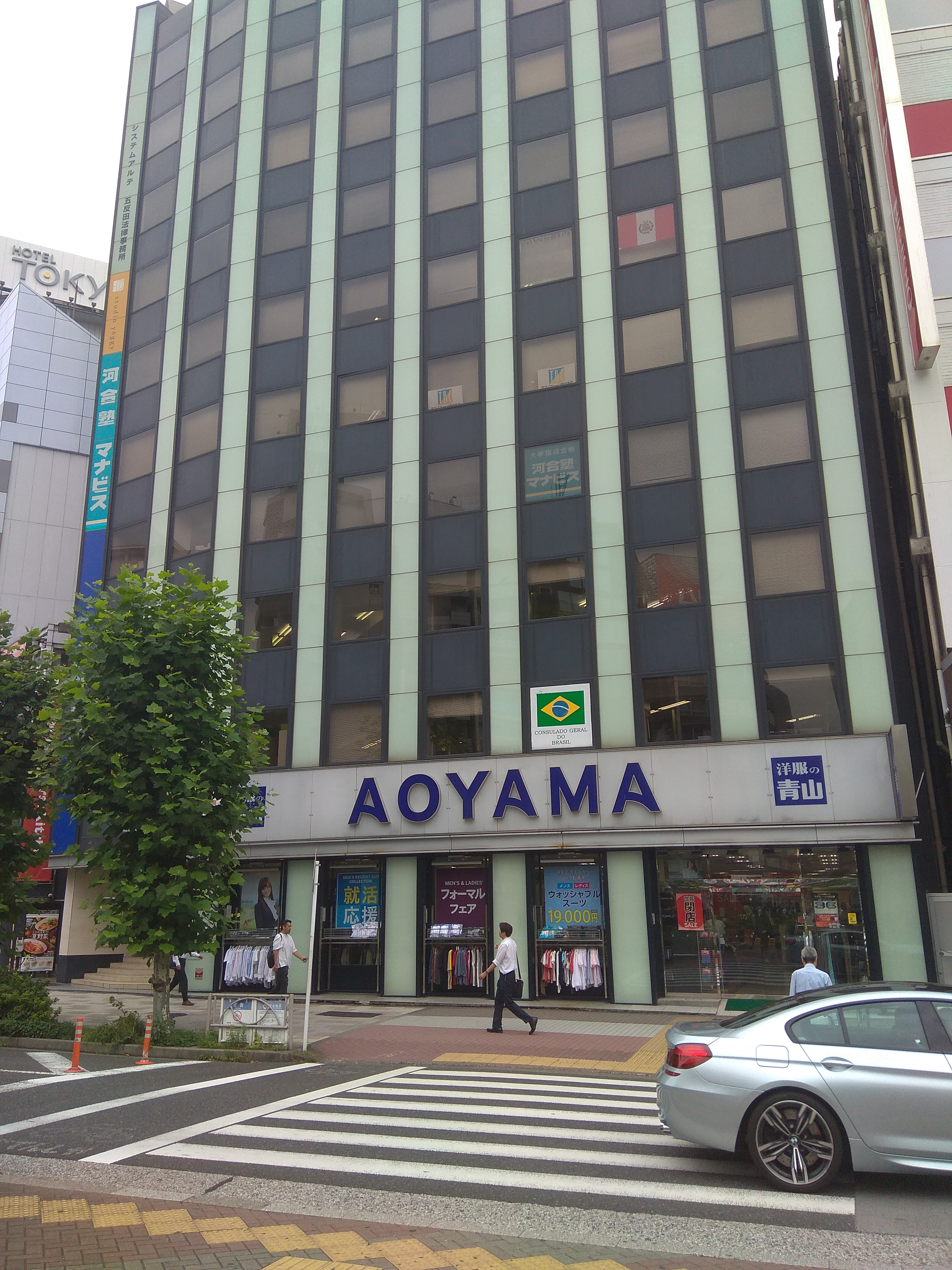
Consulate-General of Brazil in Tokyo

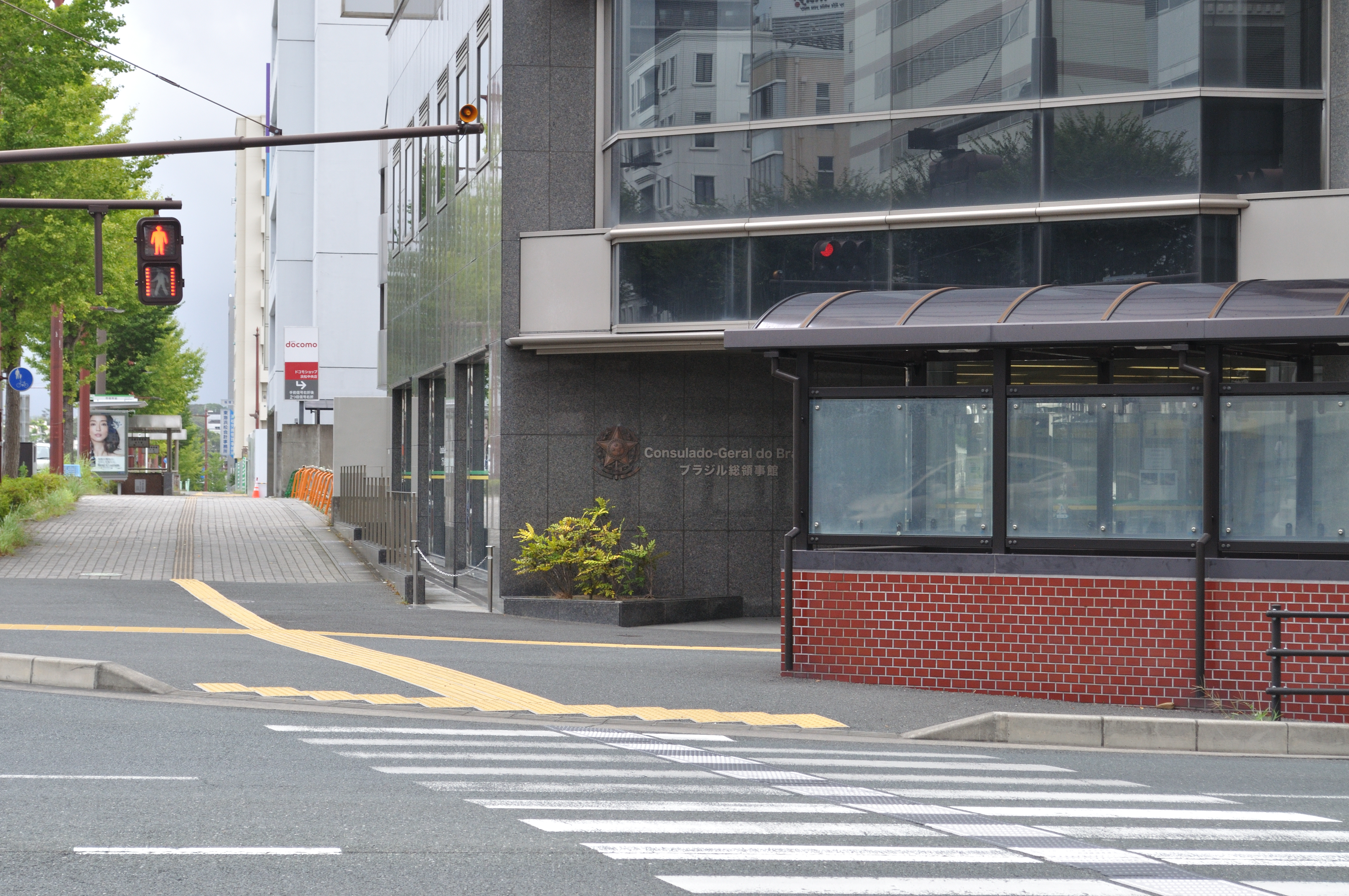
Consulate-General of Brazil in Hamamatsu

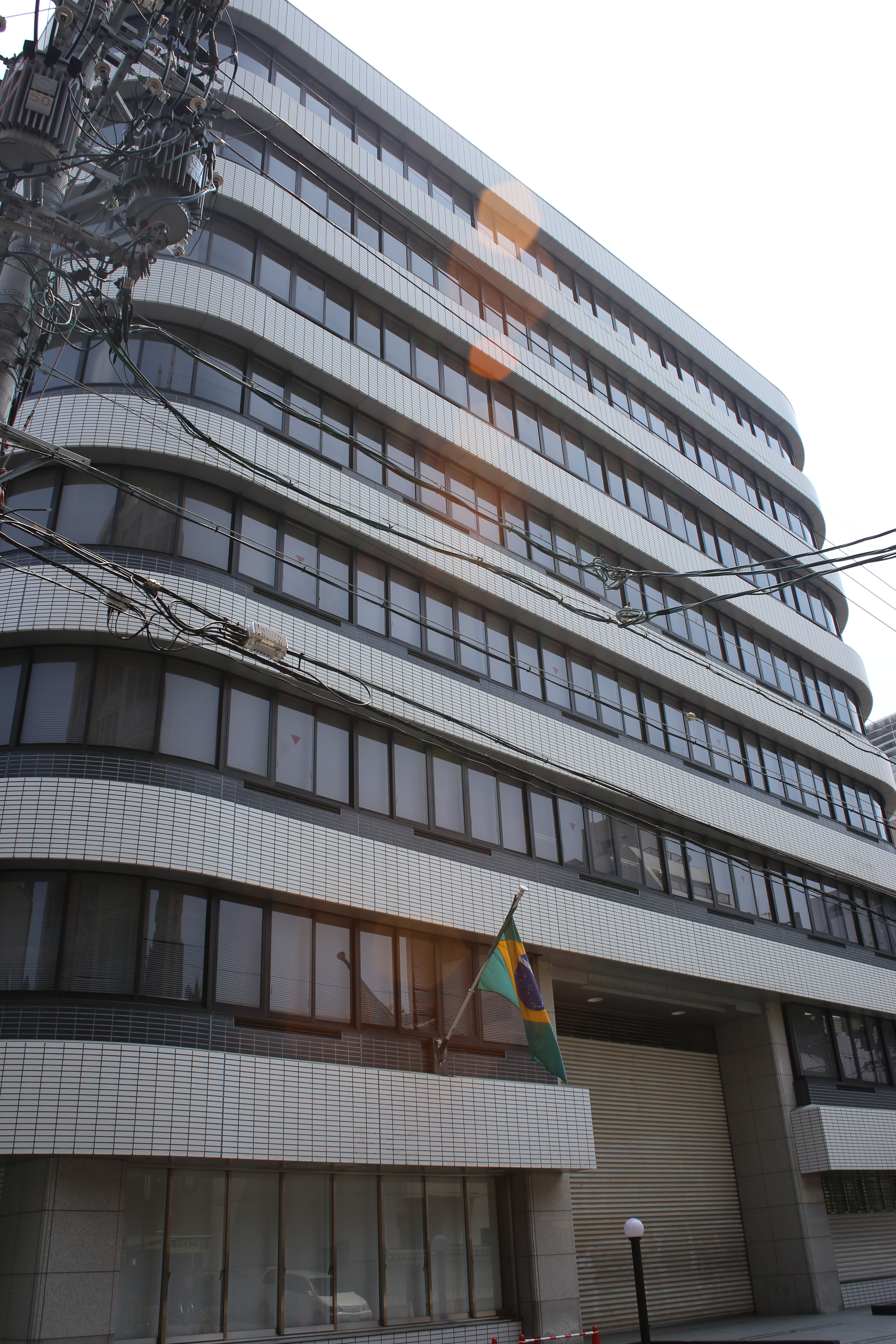
Consulate-General of Brazil in Nagoya
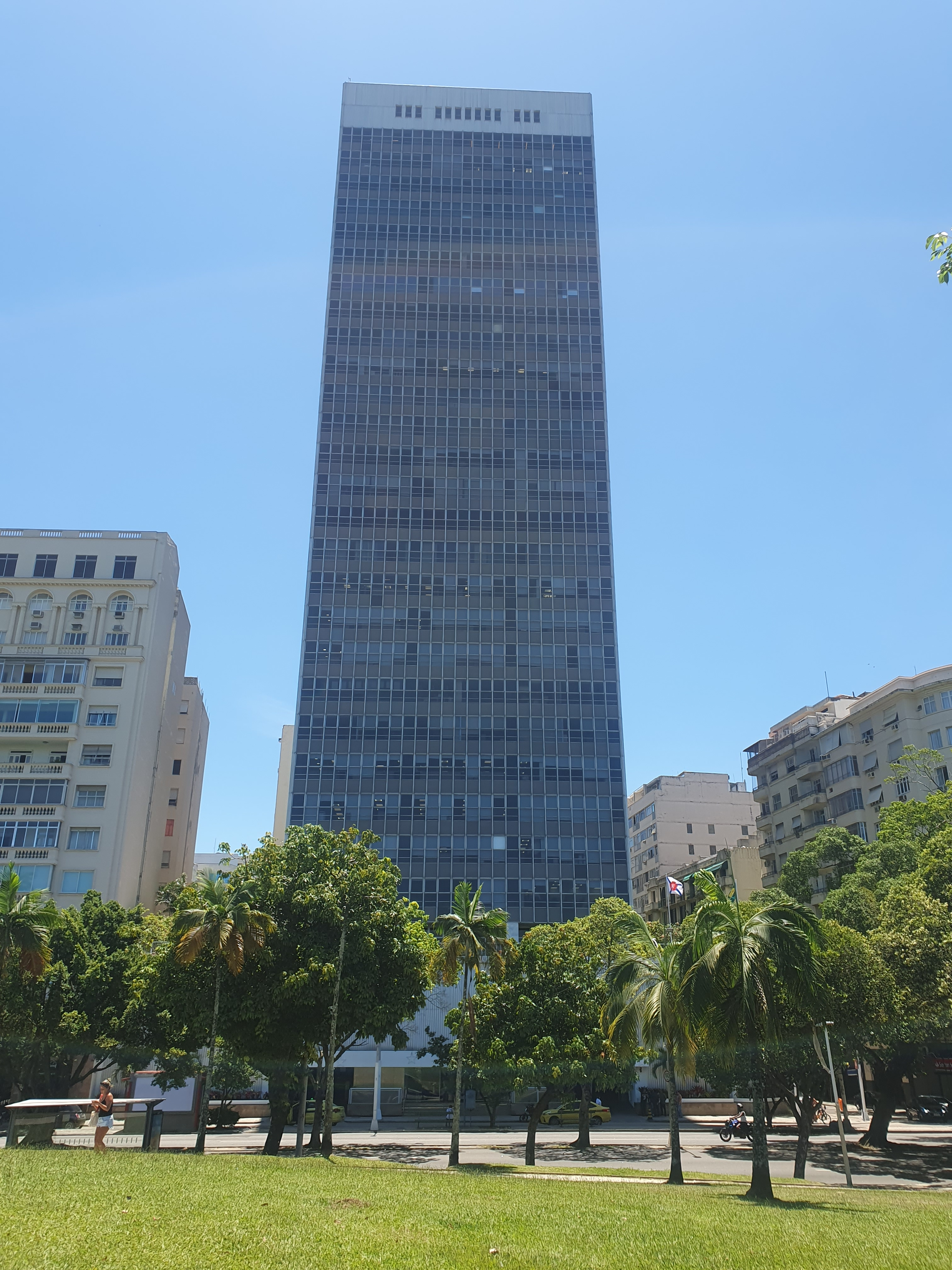
Building hosting the Consulate-General of Japan in Rio de Janeiro

== See also ==
- Brazilians in Japan
- Brazilian schools in Japan
- Japanese Brazilians
- Japanese community of São Paulo
- Japanese School of Manaus
