= Carl Friedrich Hatzfeldt zu Gleichen =

Austrian politician (1718–1793)

Count Carl Friedrich Anton Hatzfeldt zu Gleichen (14 September 1718 – 5 September 1793) was an Austrian statesman.

== Early life ==
Count Hatzfeldt was born on 14 September 1718 in Vienna. He was the son of the Imperial and Royal Privy Councillor Franz Hatzfeldt of Gleichen and Anna Charlotte, née Countess von Stadion of Warthausen. Hatzfeldt was a great-grandnephew of Generalfeldmarschall Melchior von Hatzfeldt and great-grandson of his brother Hermann.

At a young age he became a canon of Mainz.

== Career ==
In 1737 Hatzfeldt entered the civil service of the Holy Roman Empire of the German Nation as an imperial chamberlain. After the death of Charles VI in 1749, he remained in the service of the Habsburgs and, in 1741, moved to Prague as a Royal Bohemian appellate councillor. Until the dissolution of the governorship, he was supernumerary governor and then worked as an assessor of the chamber in Prague. In 1749 Hatzfeldt was appointed a full Privy Councillor.

In 1761 he was appointed president of the Court of Appeal in Prague, the German-Hereditary Credit Deputation and the Ministerial Bank Deputation. This appointment meant that he took over the management of the entire Austrian credit system and the supervision of the Vienna City Bank. His task was to reform and unify the state credit and treasury system into a general treasury. Hatzfeldt was also appointed president of the General Treasury Directorate.

After the coronation of Emperor Francis I in 1745, Hatzfeldt worked on the reorganization of state finances and accounting. At his suggestion, changes were made to the state bonds and the cash journals were introduced. On 6 May 1764, he was the first German to be awarded the Grand Cross of the Order of St. Stephen for his services. In May 1765, Hatzfeldt was appointed President of the Hofkammer (Court Chamber), succeeding Count von Herberstein, while retaining his previous offices.

After the death of Francis I in 1765, a power struggle broke out between Hatzfeld and the President of the Court Accounts Chamber, Ludwig von Zinzendorf, in which Hatzfeld sharply attacked Zinzendorf's plan to create a decentralized state bank and a state trading company. On 6 June 1768, Hatzfeldt presented the "peace and war system" for the reorganization of state finances, which was put into effect by Maria Theresa on 5 May 1769 after fierce resistance from Zinzensdorf. On 1 August 1771, paper money was introduced in implementation of Hatzfeldt's plans. In 1775, the state treasury posted a surplus for the first time.

After his appointment as Supreme Chancellor of the Court Chancellery for Austria and Bohemia, Hatzfeldt handed over his other offices to Leopold Kolowrat in 1771. In the same year, at the suggestion of Joseph II, Hatzfeldt was appointed acting Minister of State and successor to Starhemberg. Hatzfeldt's clerical and conservative views proved increasingly incompatible with Joseph's plans for state reform. In 1772 he requested the suspension of negotiations on the abolition of the death penalty and a year later he presented a draft for a system of government based on the retention of Catholicism as the state religion and viewed the feudal court and the wealth of the nobility as the source of national prosperity, where the preservation of the nobility was declared to be the main task of the government. Until his death, Hatzfeldt served as Minister for Domestic Affairs.

=== Estates ===
After the death of his father, he inherited the Bohemian dominion of Dlaschkowitz (known today as "Dlažkovice") in 1733. He promoted garnet mining in Podseditz, where he established the settlement of Neugründel in 1773. In 1779, Hatzfeldt had a garnet factory built in Podseditz, thus laying the foundations for the garnet industry in the Bohemian Central Mountains (known today as "České Středohoří"). In 1773, he acquired the western Bohemian dominion of Chlumcan (known today as "Chlumčany").

== Personal life ==
On 16 November 1755, Hatzfeldt married Johanne Maria Charlotte Friderica von Ostein (1733–1821), only daughter of Count Johann Franz Heinrich Carl von Ostein, a diplomat who served in St. Petersburg and London, and Countess Maria Carolina Anna Johanna von Berlepsch, heiress of Myllendonk. Ostein's great-grandmother was a confidante of Queen Maria Anna, second wife of King Charles II of Spain. Their marriage was childless.

Count Hatzfeldt died in Vienna on 5 September 1793.
