= Philipp von Orsini-Rosenberg =

Austrian nobleman, diplomat and politician

Count Philipp Josef von Orsini-Rosenberg

Imperial Ambassador to the Republic of Venice
- In office 1754–1764
- Preceded by: Gian Antonio Turinetti di Priero
- Succeeded by: Giacomo Durazzo

Governor of the Archduchy of Austria under the Enns
- In office 1750–1753
- Preceded by: Adam Philipp Losy von Losymthal
- Succeeded by: Heinrich Wilhelm von Haugwitz

Imperial Ambassador to the Netherlands
- In office 1748–1748
- Preceded by: Thaddäus von Reischach
- Succeeded by: Thaddäus von Reischach

Imperial Ambassador to Portugal
- In office 1746–1747
- Preceded by: Konrad Adolf von Albrecht
- Succeeded by: Johann Philipp Stoltius

Imperial Ambassador to Russia
- In office 1744–1745
- Preceded by: Nikolaus von Hochholzer
- Succeeded by: Nikolaus von Hochholzer

Imperial Ambassador to Prussia
- In office 1744–1744
- Preceded by: Antoniotto Botta Adorno
- Succeeded by: Joseph von Bernes

Personal details
- Born: 3 June 1691 Vienna
- Died: 5 February 1765 (aged 73) Vienna
- Spouse(s): Countess Maria Dominika von Kaunitz (m. 1712; died 1756) Giustiniana Wynne (m. 1758; died 1765)
- Relations: Raimondo Montecuccoli (grandfather); Maria Margareta of Dietrichstein (grandmother)
- Parent(s): Count Wolfgang Andreas von Orsini-Rosenberg; Princess Ernestina Barbara Montecuccoli

Count Philipp Josef von Orsini-Rosenberg (3 June 1691 – 5 February 1765), was an Austrian nobleman, diplomat and politician.

== Early life ==
Count Orsini-Rosenberg was born on 3 June 1691 in Vienna. He was a son of Count Wolfgang Andreas von Orsini-Rosenberg (1626–1693), and, his third wife, Princess Ernestina Barbara Montecuccoli (1663–1703). Philipp was a child when his father died and his mother entrusted his education with Count von Oed as his tutor. From his father's prior marriage to Eva Regina von Welz, he had an elder half-brother, Count Joseph Paris von Orsini-Rosenberg.

His paternal grandparents were Johann Andreas von Rosenberg, (Note: His grandfather, Johann Andreas von Rosenberg (1600–1667), Herr von Rosenberg, was elevated to the Reichsfreiherrenstand with the title of Freiherr of the Holy Roman Empire, Freiherr of Lerchenau, Herr of Magereckh and Grafenstein on 2 August 1633, and, in 1648, to the Austrian Grafenstand. Since 1681, the family held the title of Reichsgraf, and in 1683 they became members of the Reichstag. In the same year, they took the name of the old Italian princely Orsini family; their family name changed to Orsini-Rosenberg.) and Juliana Kulmer von Rosenbichl (a daughter of Maximilian Bernhard Dominic Kulmer von Rosenbichl). His maternal grandparents were Raimondo Montecuccoli and Countess Maria Margareta of Dietrichstein-Nikolsburg (a daughter of Maximilian, 2nd Prince of Dietrichstein-Nikolsburg and, his first wife, Princess Anna Maria, a daughter of Karl I, Prince of Liechtenstein). His maternal uncle was Prince Leopold Philip Montecuccoli.

== Career ==
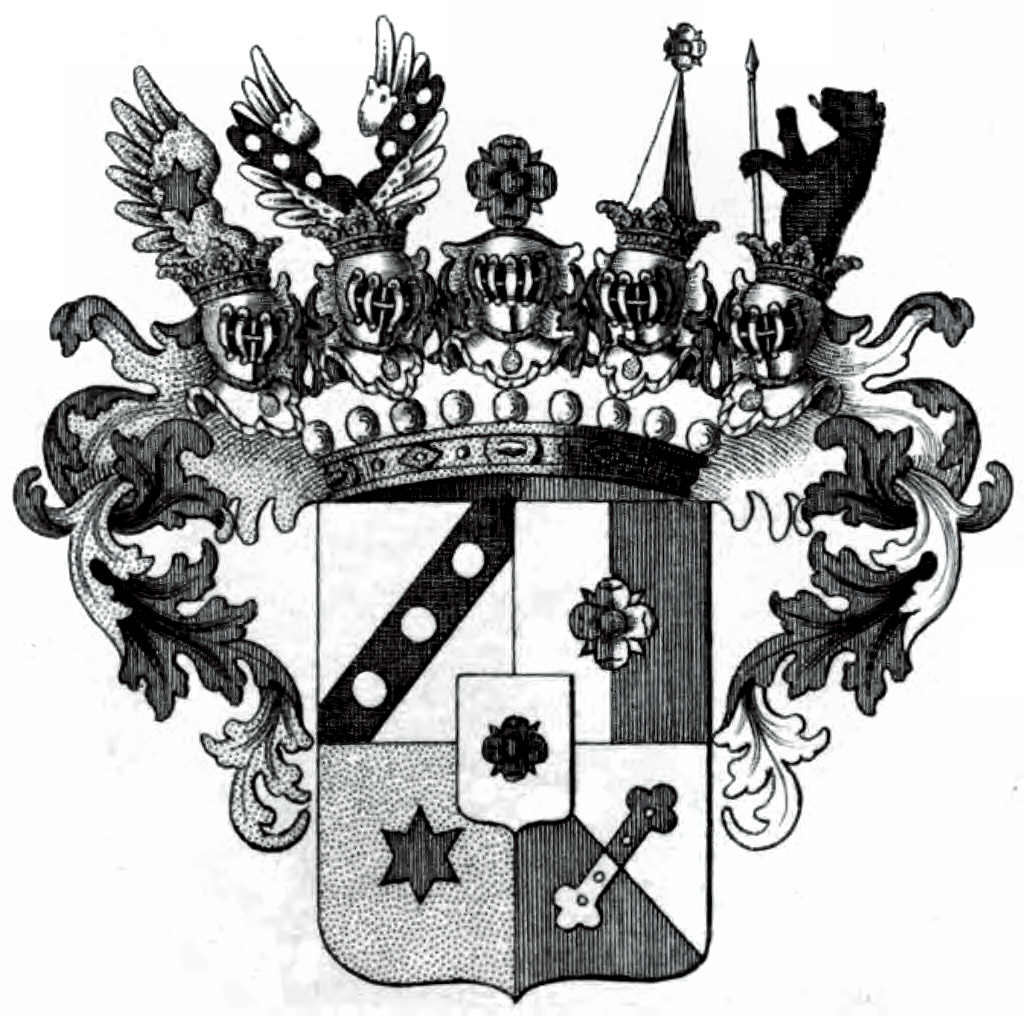
Coat of arms of the Counts of Orsini-Rosenberg

He began his diplomatic career at the Court of Emperor Joseph I, however, it was the Emperor's successor (and brother), Charles VI, who appointed Count Orsini-Rosenberg chamberlain upon his accession to the throne in 1711. In 1713, he carried out his first diplomatic mission on behalf of the Holy Roman Empire, namely to convey the Emperor's congratulations to the King of Portugal on the birth of the Prince of Brazil. After his return, he held higher positions in rapid succession, first becoming Hofkammerrer, then president of several chamber committees, then, in April 1721, First Councilor and Director of the Chamber of the Kingdom of Serbia and, on 19 June 1722, President of the state-owned salt industry.

After some time he resigned his post and lived on his estates away from state affairs until he was recalled to service by Empress Maria Theresa in April 1744, who asked him to take up the post of Imperial Ambassador to the Prussian Court. He did not remain there long, because after the outbreak of War with Prussia, he was reassigned to the Embassy in St. Petersburg where one of his predecessors, Antoniotto Botta Adorno, had made a bad name for himself by participating in court intrigues. Count Orsini-Rosenberg then had the difficult task of regaining the trust of Tsarina Elizabeth at the Austrian court, which he succeeded at admirably on 3 November 1744 by obtaining a public declaration.

Discharged in November 1745, Philipp Joseph went to the Netherlands as Ambassador, joining forces with the Minister Plenipotentiary of the Austrian Netherlands, Baron Franz von Reischach: together they succeeded in dissuading the States General of the Netherlands from their initial idea of maintaining neutrality when the French invaded their territory. He then moved to England and, after a short stay in Lisbon, returned to Austria in 1750 and became president of the Lower House of Parliament. In May 1753 he succeeded the Marquis von Prieal as Ambassador to the Most Serene Republic of Venice. He was recalled to Vienna in 1764, and died there in February of the following year.

== Personal life ==
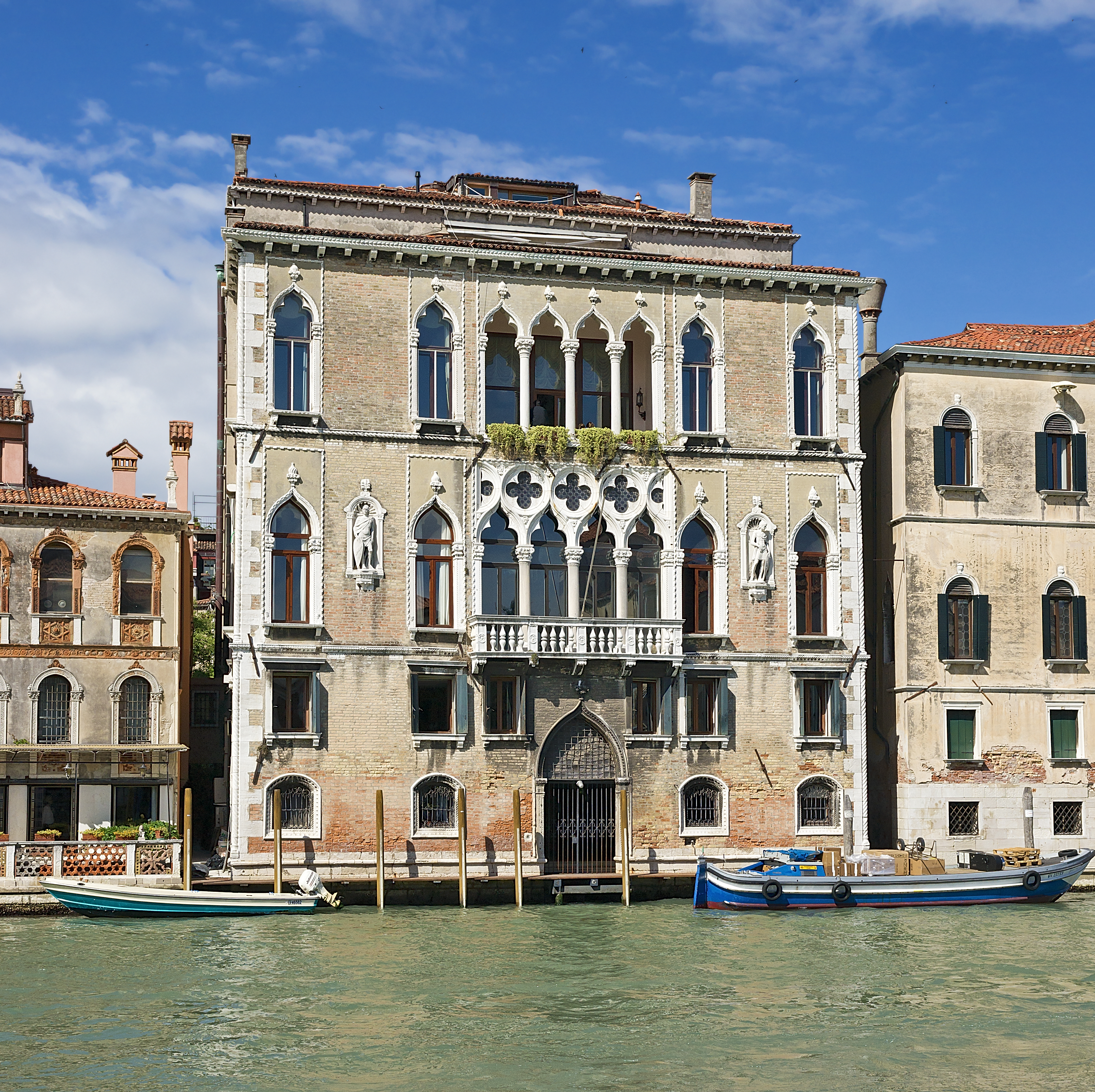
The Palazzo Loredan in Venice

In 1712, Count Orsini-Rosenberg was married to Countess Maria Dominika von Kaunitz (1689–1756), a daughter of Count Dominik Andreas von Kaunitz, Baron of Šlapanice, and Countess Maria Eleonora von Sternberg. Through her elder brother, Count Maximilian Ulrich von Kaunitz, she was aunt to Wenzel Anton, Prince of Kaunitz-Rietberg. Together, they were the parents of:

- Countess Marie Anna Franziska von Orsini-Rosenberg (1717–1760), who married Count Georg Heinrich von Wurmbrand-Stuppach, in 1743.
- Countess Josepha Caterine von Orsini-Rosenberg (1718–1758), who died unmarried.
- Countess Maria Anna von Orsini-Rosenberg (1719–1756), who married Count Franz von Thurn und Valsássina-Como-Vercelli, Privy Councillor of the Emperor, Imperial Chamberlain, hofmeister of Peter Leopold, Grand Duke of Tuscany, in 1747.
- Count Vinzenz Ferrerius von Orsini-Rosenberg (1722–1794), Privy Councillor of the Emperor, Imperial Chamberlain, Governor of Carniola and Carinthia; he married Countess Marie Juliana von Stubenberg, in 1756. (Note: When his childless cousin, Franz Xaver von Orsini-Rosenberg, was elevated to the rank of Imperial Prince in 1790, Vinzenz and his descendants were simultaneously appointed his successors with the prospect of the title of princes. However, Vinzenz predeceased his cousin, so that his eldest son, Franz Seraph, then became the 2nd Prince of Orsini-Rosenberg.)
- Countess Maria Antonia von Orsini-Rosenberg (1723–1762), who married Johann Gottfried Heister, Privy Councillor of the Emperor, Imperial Chamberlain, Governor of Tyrol, in 1741.
- Count Sigmund Andreas von Orsini-Rosenberg (b. 1725), who died unmarried.
- Countess Marie Ernestina von Orsini-Rosenberg (1729–1764), who married Count Karel Ujfalussy, Colonel of the Imperial Army, in 1756.

After the death of his first wife in Venice in 1756, he met Giustiniana Wynne (1732–1791), daughter of an English baronet, Sir Richard Wynne. The former lover of Italian statesman Andrea Memmo and rake Giacomo Casanova, she married Orsini-Rosenberg in 1758. The Count remained in Venice for eleven years, hosted in Palazzo Loredan, which he knew as "the ambassador".

Count Orsini-Rosenberg died on 5 February 1765 in Vienna.

=== Descendants ===
Through his son Vinzenz, he was a grandfather of Franz Seraph of Orsini-Rosenberg (1761–1832), who became 2nd Prince of Orsini-Rosenberg in 1794 following the death of his second cousin, Franz Xaver von Orsini-Rosenberg.

== Notes ==
Diplomatic posts
Preceded by Gian Antonio Turinetti di Priero	Imperial Ambassador to the Republic of Venice; 1754–1764	Succeeded by Giacomo Durazzo
Preceded by Thaddäus von Reischach	Imperial Ambassador to the Netherlands; 1748	Succeeded by Thaddäus von Reischach
Preceded by Johann von Albrecht; Konrad Adolf von Albrecht	Imperial Ambassador to Portugal; 1746–1747	Succeeded by Johann Philipp Stoltius
Preceded by Nikolaus von Hochholzer	Imperial Ambassador to Russia; 1744–1745	Succeeded by Nikolaus von Hochholzer
Preceded by Antoniotto Botta Adorno	Imperial Ambassador to Prussia; 1744	Succeeded by Joseph von Bernes
Government offices
Preceded by Adam Philipp Losy von Losymthal	Governor of the Archduchy of Austria under the Enns; 1750–1753	Succeeded by Heinrich Wilhelm von Haugwitz
