= Ferenc Esterházy =

Ferenc Esterházy may refer to:

- Ferenc Esterházy (1533–1604), ancestor of the House of Esterházy
- Ferenc Esterházy (1683–1754), founder of the Cseklész branch, Master of the Treasury (1746–1754)
- Ferenc Esterházy (1715–1785), Chancellor of Hungary (1762–1785), Ban of Croatia (1783–1785)
