= Miklós Esterházy (1711–1764) =

Hungarian noble and diplomat

Count Miklós "Nikolaus" Esterházy
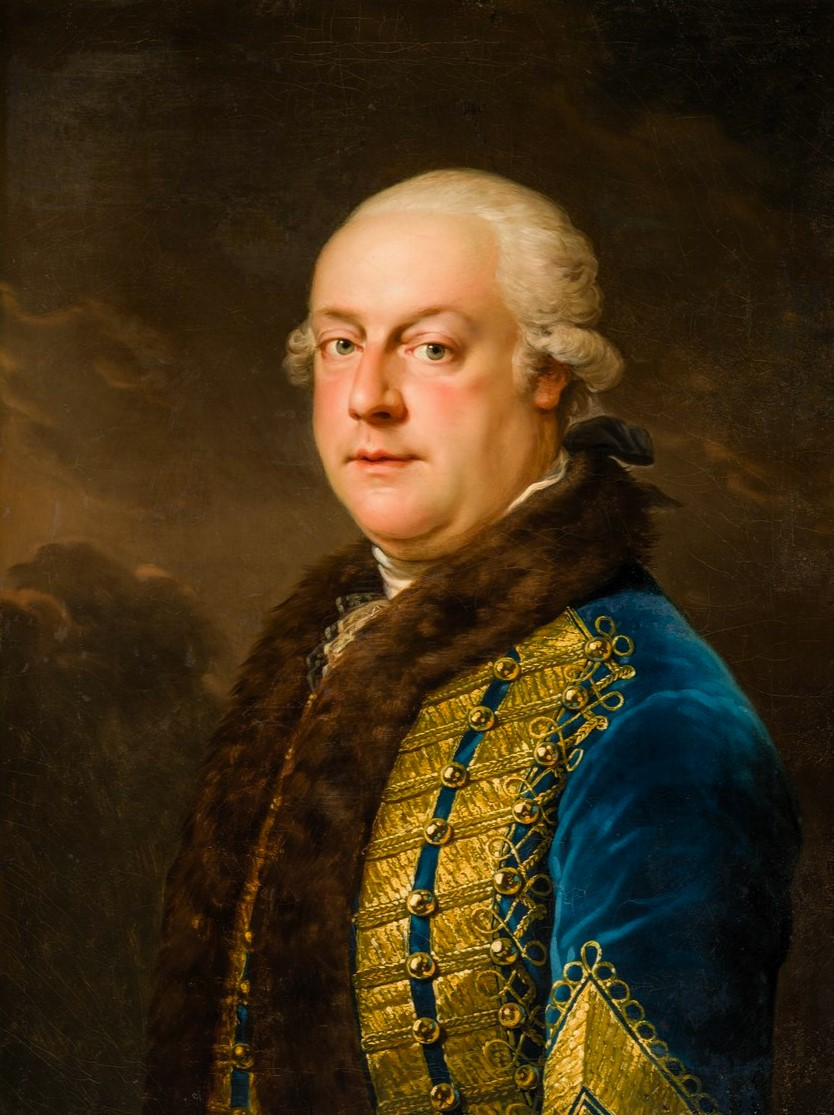
- Portrait of Count Esterházy, 1758

Austrian Ambassador to Russia
- In office 16 April 1753 – 22 May 1761
- Monarch: Maria Theresa
- Preceded by: Johann Franz von Pretlack
- Succeeded by: Florimond Claude von Mercy-Argenteau

Personal details
- Born: 16 November 1711 Vienna, Archduchy of Austria
- Died: 21 June 1764 (aged 52) Karlovy Vary, Kingdom of Bohemia
- Spouse: Princess Anna Lubomirska (m. 1744; died 1764)
- Relations: Ferenc Esterházy (brother); János Pálffy (grandfather)
- Parent(s): Ferenc Esterházy; Maria Sidonia Pálffy ab Erdöd
- Profession: Diplomat

Count Miklós "Nikolaus" Esterházy de Galántha (16 November 1711 – 21 June 1764) was a Hungarian noble and diplomat from the Esterházy family. He served as an Imperial and Royal Chamberlain, Privy Councilor, and diplomat who served as Empress Maria Theresa's Envoy to Russia between 1761 and 1763.

== Early life ==
Esterházy was born in Vienna in the Archduchy of Austria on 19 September 1715. He was the eldest son of Count Ferenc Esterházy de Galántha (1683–1754) and Countess Maria Sidonia Pálffy ab Erdöd. Among his siblings was Ferenc Esterházy, who was the Ban of Croatia and Slavonia.

His paternal grandparents were Count Ferenc "Ferko" Esterházy de Galántha (the youngest son of Count Nikolaus Esterházy de Galántha), and Countess Katalin "Catharina" Thököly de Késmárk (a daughter of Count István Thököly de Késmárk). His maternal grandparents were Count János V Pálffy ab Erdöd, the Ban of Croatia and Palatine of the Kingdom of Hungary, and, his first wife, Countess Teréz Czobor de Czoborszentmihály.

Esterházy attended the Jesuit grammar school in Pressburg (present-day Bratislava, Slovakia). In 1732, his father sent him and his younger brother to the academy of Lunéville in Lorraine, where they spent half a year together and from October 1732 to April 1733 before taking a journey through southern Germany, port cities in the Netherlands, Great Britain, Flanders, France, northern Italy, as well as Rome and Naples. They returned to Vienna in July 1735.

== Career ==
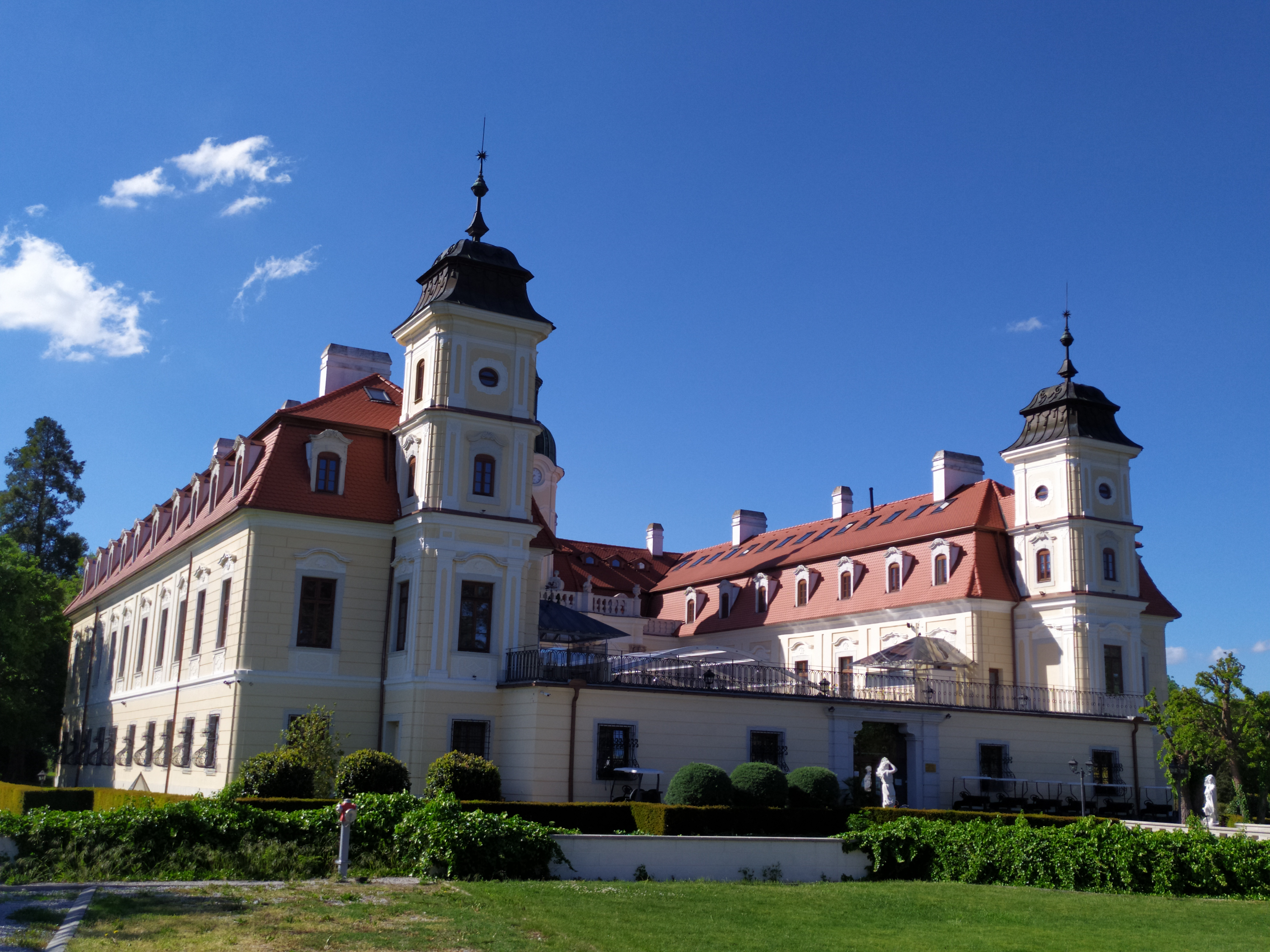
The family's castle in Cseklész, located in what is today western Slovakia

During the reign of Empress Maria Theresa, Esterházy was appointed special Envoy of Empress Maria Theresa in Poland. In 1747, the Austrians wanted to raise the rank of ambassador, but Augustus III of Saxony refused because it was linked to the alliance and the marriage of his daughter with France, the enemy of Austria, and did not want problems with her relations. This led to short-term rupture of relations between the Empress and Augustus III.

After his time in Poland, he was appointed Ambassador Extraordinary to the Court of Empress Elizabeth Petrovna on 16 April 1753, succeeding Baron Johann Franz von Pretlack, who became General of the Cavalry (General der Kavallerie). For eight years in St. Petersburg, he managed diplomatic relations between the Austrian and Russian imperial courts until 22 May 1761 when he was replaced by Count Florimond Claude von Mercy-Argenteau, the former Ambassador to Sardinia-Piedmont. Esterházy served as Captain of the Hungarian Noble Guard, based in Vienna, from 1762 until his death.

== Personal life ==
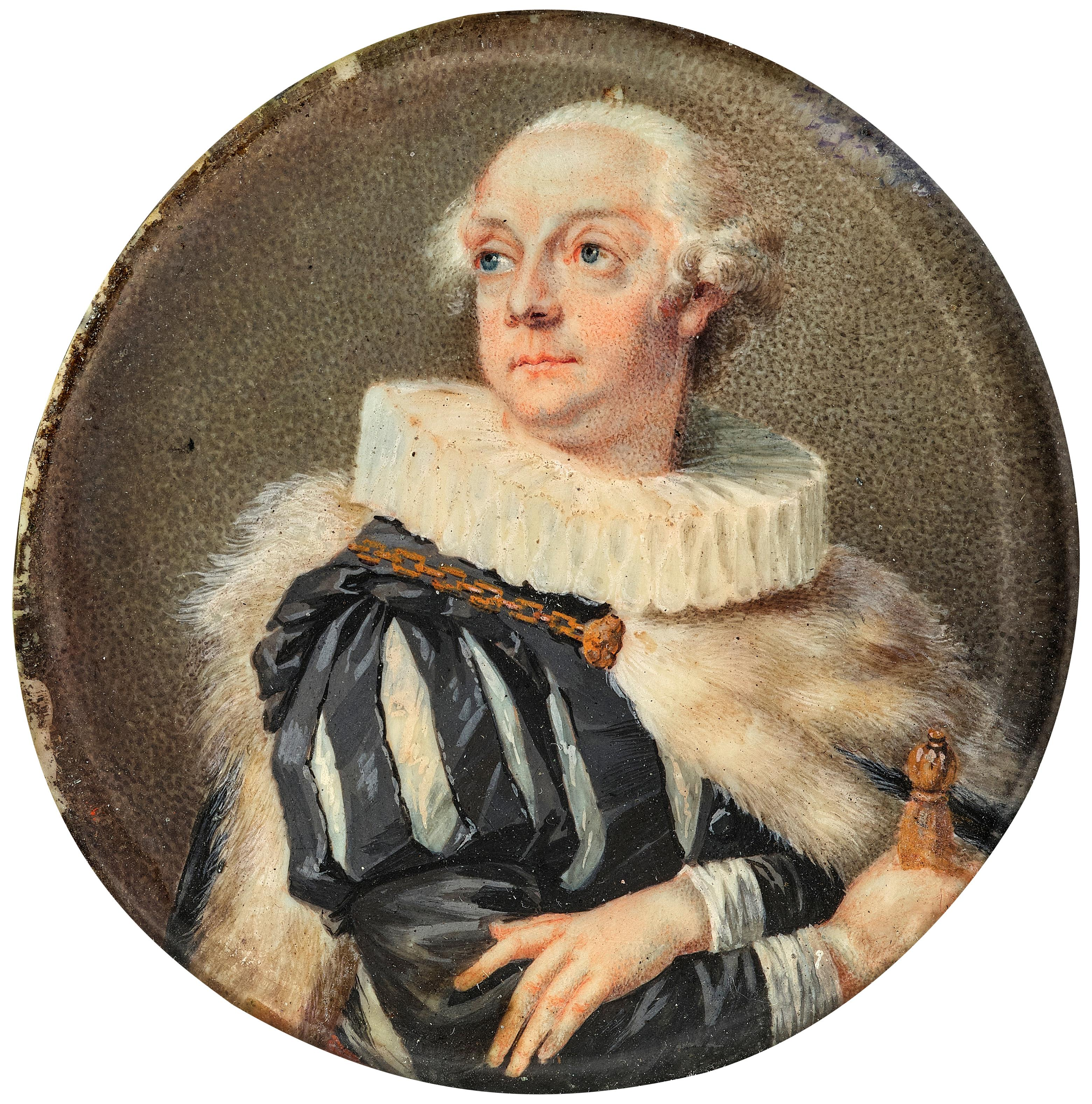
Portrait of his son, János Baptist, in the costume of Fiesco in Schiller's The Conspiracy of Fiesco at Genoa, attributed to Heinrich Füger

In 1744, he married Princess Anna Lubomirska (1722–1771), a daughter of Prince Teodor Lubomirski and the former Elizabeth "Elżbieta" Culler-Cumming. Together, they were the parents of:

- Anna Mária Esterházy de Galántha (1745–1830), who married Count Antal Amade de Várkony, a son of Count Tádé Amade.
- Ferenc Esterházy de Galántha (1746–1811), who married Maria Ernestine von Starhemberg, a daughter of Otto Gundaker von Starhemberg (a grandson of Count Gundaker Thomas Starhemberg).
- Mária Jozefa Esterházy de Galántha (1746–1837), who married Count János Fekete de Galántha III, a son of Count György Fekete de Galántha IV.
- János Baptist Esterhazy de Galántha (1748–1800), who married Countess Mária Anna Jozefa Franciska de Paula Pálffy ab Erdõd, a daughter of Count Miklós VII Palffy ab Erdöd (a grandson of Count Miklós Pálffy) and Countess Maria Anna Sidonia von Althann. Her brother, Count Károly József Jeromos Pálffy ab Erdöd, was Chancellor of Hungary.

Count Miklós Esterházy died on 21 June 1764, at Karlovy Vary in the Kingdom of Bohemia. His widow died in Vienna on 17 August 1771.

Diplomatic posts
Preceded by Johann Franz von Pretlack	Austrian Ambassador to Russia; 1753–1761	Succeeded by Florimond von Mercy-Argenteau
