= Johann Franz von Pretlack =

Austrian ambassador

Baron Johann Franz von Pretlack

Austrian Ambassador to Russia
- In office 18 September 1751 – 10 January 1753
- Monarch: Maria Theresa
- Preceded by: Josef Bernes
- Succeeded by: Miklós Esterházy de Galantha
- In office 24 February 1746 – 19 May 1748
- Monarch: Maria Theresa
- Preceded by: Nikolaus von Hochholzer
- Succeeded by: Josef Bernes
- In office 28 September 1732 – 11 August 1734
- Monarch: Charles VI
- Preceded by: Franz Wratislaw
- Succeeded by: Johann Franz Heinrich Carl von Ostein

Personal details
- Born: Nikolaus Sebastian Edler von Hochholzer; 16 September 1708 Darmstadt, Landgraviate of Hesse-Kassel
- Died: 15 November 1767 (aged 59) Vienna, Archduchy of Austria
- Parent(s): Johann Rudolf Victor von Pretlack; Maria Franziska Bock von Bläsheim
- Education: University of Giessen

Baron Johann Franz von Pretlack (16 September 1708 – 15 November 1767) was an Imperial General Field Marshal as well as Imperial Ambassador and Imperial General of the Cavalry.

== Early life ==
Baron von Pretlack was born on 16 September 1708 in Darmstadt, Landgraviate of Hesse-Kassel. He was the second son of five children of General Baron Johann Rudolf Victor von Pretlack (1668–1737) and, his first wife, Baroness Maria Franziska Bock von Bläsheim (1680–1711). His elder sister, Sophia Helene, married Franz Reinhard von Gemmingen-Guttenberg, After his mother's death in 1711, his father married Christiane Margarethe von Bernstorff. From this marriage, he had a number of younger half-siblings, including Johann Karl Ludwig Christian von Pretlack, who became an Imperial Field Marshal-Lieutenant, and Caroline Friederike Sophie von Pretlack, who married Maj.-Gen. Georg Ludwig von Werner. His father owned considerable properties, including the Pretlack Palace (Pretlack’sches Palais) in Rimhorn.

His maternal grandparents were Christian Friedrich Bock von Bläsheim, Knight Councilor, and Maria Helene von Weyler.

Pretlack received his schooling in Strasbourg and then went to the University of Giessen.

== Career ==
After completing his studies he decided to join the military and was appointed Ensign of Hesse-Darmstadt in 1726 and Captain of the Dragoon Guard in 1731. He transferred to Imperial Service, converted to Catholicism and in 1736 was made Imperial Lieutenant Colonel (Oberstleutnant) and Imperial Adjutant General. In 1739, he was promoted to Colonel in the Württemberg Dragoon Regiment. With this regiment he fought in the Battle of Mollwitz during the First Silesian War (in the early stages of the War of the Austrian Succession) in 1741, where he was wounded. On 16 June 1742 he was appointed General Field Sergeant and fought in Bohemia, Bavaria, Swabia, Alsace and on the Rhine. In 1745 he was given the Lubomirski Cuirassier Regiment. Also in 1745, he brought the news of the election of Francis I as Holy Roman Emperor to Vienna and St. Petersburg. He remained in St. Petersburg and was Imperial Envoy to St. Petersburg from 1746 to 1748, with the task of coordinating the action against the Prussians, and again from 1751 to 1753. During this time, he concluded a defensive pact with Russia and was appointed Field Marshal-Lieutenant (Feldmarschall-Lieutenant) on 30 June 1746 and Privy Councillor (Geheimrat) in 1749.

On 25 April 1750, he was promoted to Imperial General Field Marshal Lieutenant (General-Feldmarschalleutnant) and on 13 July 1754, to General of the Cavalry (General der Kavallerie). When it became known that the future Elector Frederick II of Hesse-Kassel had converted to Catholicism, Pretlack was sent to Kassel in 1756 to mediate between father and son.

Finally, in May 1761, he succeeded General Karl Urban, Count of Chanclos as Governor of Ostend, and on 13 May 1761, he was appointed Catholic Imperial General Field Marshal of Ordnance (Generalfeldzeugmeister). However, he stayed mostly in Vienna and died there in 1767.

== Personal life ==
Baron von Pretlack died on 15 November 1767 in Vienna.

=== Honours and awards ===
As early as 1733, he became an Honorary Knight of the Order of St. John and, since 19 June 1747, a holder of the Russian Order of St. Andrew and was also a holder of the Order of Saint Alexander Nevsky.
