= List of ambassadors of Austria to Portugal =

Ambassadors of Austria to Portugal

Ambassador of the Republic of Austria to the Portuguese Republic
- Coat of arms of Austria
- Incumbent; Christoph Meran since 2021
- Ministry of Foreign Affairs; Embassy of Austria, Lisbon
- Style: His Excellency
- Website: Austrian Embassy, Lisbon

The Ambassador of the Republic of Austria to the Portuguese Republic is the Republic of Austria's (formerly the Holy Roman Empire, the Austrian Empire and the Austro-Hungarian Empire) foremost diplomatic representative in Portugal. As head of Austria's diplomatic mission there, the ambassador is the official representative of the president and government of Austria to the President and the government of Portugal. The position has the rank and status of an Ambassador Extraordinary and Minister Plenipotentiary and the embassy is located in Lisbon.

Relations between the two countries began in the eighteenth century and were interrupted on particular occasions, such as the occupation of Portugal by Napoleon in 1807.

== Heads of mission ==
=== Holy Roman Empire ===
- 1700–1709: Karl Ernst von Waldstein
- 1709–1716: Franz Ferdinand von Kuenburg
- 1716–1718: Juan Martin
- 1718–1723: Pablo Martin
- 1723–1725: Juan Jacinto Vázquez y Vargas
- 1725–1727: Michael Strozzi
- 1727–1730: Vacant
- 1730–1737: Johann von Albrecht and Konrad Adolf von Albrecht
- 1737–1746: Vacant
- 1746–1747: Philipp Josef von Orsini-Rosenberg
- 1747–1748: Johann Philipp Stoltius
- 1748–1750: Vacant
- 1750–1751: Georg Adam von Starhemberg
- 1751–1759: Vacant
- 1759–1759: Johann Sigismund von Khevenhüller-Metsch
- 1759–1764: Johann Baptist Keil
- 1764–1765: Philipp von Welsperg zu Raitenau e Primör
- 1765–1768: Johann Baptist Keil
- 1768–1809: Adam von Lezeltern

=== Austrian Empire ===
- 1809–1813: Vacant
- 1813–1818: Adam von Lezeltern
- 1818–1819: Heinrich von Bombelles
- 1819–1820: Vacant
- 1820–1821: Lothar von Berks
- 1821–1823: Vacant
- 1823–1824: Franz Binder von Krieglstein
- 1824–1824: Vacant
- 1824–1827: Wilhelm von Pflügl
- 1827–1828: Heinrich von Bombelles
- 1828–1841: Vacant
- 1841–1846: Wenzel von Mareschall
- 1846–1847: Albert von Crivelli
- 1847–1852: Georg von Esterhäzy
- 1852–1852: Charles von Walter
- 1852–1857: Nikolaus von Giorgi
- 1857–1867: Eduard von Lebzeltern-Collenbach

=== Austro-Hungarian Empire ===
- 1867–1869: Ferdinand Marckwort
- 1869–1884: Alois von Dumreicher
- 1884–1887: Ernst von Brenner
- 1887–1888: Florian von Rosty von Barkocz
- 1888–1889: Arthur Weber Edler von Webenau
- 1889–1895: Emil von Gödel-Lannoy
- 1895–1902: Otto von Hohenwart
- 1902–1905: Otto zu Brandis
- 1905–1909: Albert Eperjesy von Szászváros und Tóti
- 1909–1909: Gilbert von Hohenwart zu Gerlachstein
- 1909–1920: Otto Kuhn von Kuhnenfeld

=== Republic of Austria ===
- 1920–1931: Johannes Alfred Eduard Wimmer
- 1931–1954: Johannes Wimmer
- 1954–1955: Rudolf Seemann
- 1955–1960: Klaus Wintersen
- 1960–1964: Rudolf Ender
- 1964–1973: Herman Gohn
- 1973–1979: Jörg Schubert
- 1979–1985: Erich Hochleitner
- 1985–1993: Alexander Otto
- 1993–1995: Heinz Weinberger
- 1995–2004: Alfred Missong
- 2004–2009: Ferdinand Trauttmansdorff
- 2009–2009: Edwald Jaeger
- 2009–2013: Bernhard Wrabetz
- 2013–2018: Thomas Stelzer
- 2018–2021: Robert Zischg
- 2021–present Christoph Meran

== See also ==
- Foreign relations of Austria
- Foreign relations of Portugal
