= Ferenc Esterházy (1715–1785) =

Hungarian noble and politician (1715-1785)

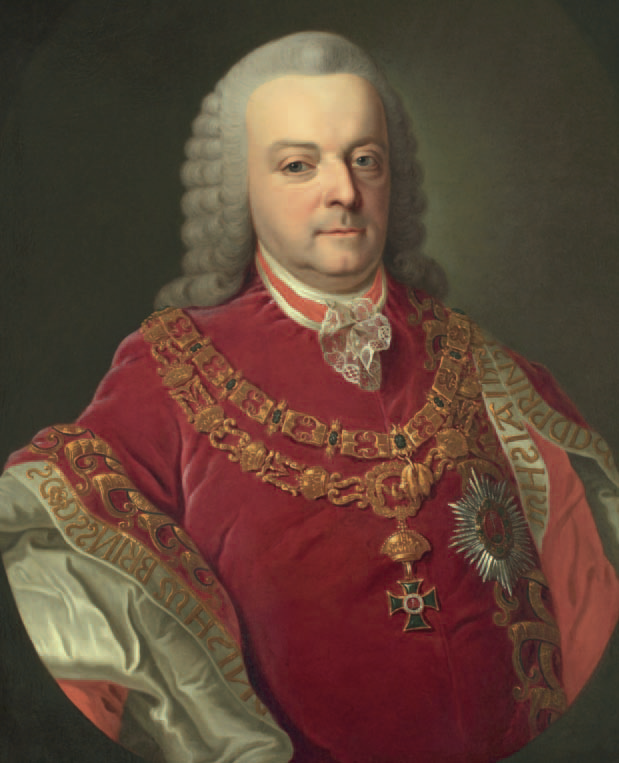

Ban of Croatia
- In office 1783 – 7 November 1785
- Preceded by: Ferenc Nádasdy
- Succeeded by: Ferenc Balassa

Personal details
- Born: 19 September 1715 Pápa, Kingdom of Hungary
- Died: 7 November 1785 (aged 70) Cseklész, Kingdom of Hungary (today: Bernolákovo, Slovakia)
- Parent(s): Ferenc Esterházy; Maria Sidonia Pálffy ab Erdöd
- Profession: Politician

Count Ferenc Esterházy de Galántha (Croatian: Franjo Esterházy; 19 September 1715 – 7 November 1785) was a Hungarian noble and politician who served as Ban of Croatia between 1783 and 1785.

== Early life ==
Esterházy was born in Pápa, Kingdom of Hungary on 19 September 1715. He was the son of Count Ferenc Esterházy de Galántha (1683–1754) and Countess Maria Sidonia Pálffy ab Erdöd. Among his siblings was Miklós "Nikolaus" Esterházy de Galántha, who served as the Austrian Envoy to Russia from 1753 to 1761.

His paternal grandparents were Count Ferenc "Ferko" Esterházy de Galántha (the youngest son of Count Nikolaus Esterházy de Galántha), and Countess Katalin "Catharina" Thököly de Késmárk (a daughter of Count István Thököly de Késmárk). His maternal grandparents were Count János V Pálffy ab Erdöd, the Ban of Croatia and Palatine of the Kingdom of Hungary, and, his first wife, Countess Teréz Czobor de Czoborszentmihály.

== Career ==
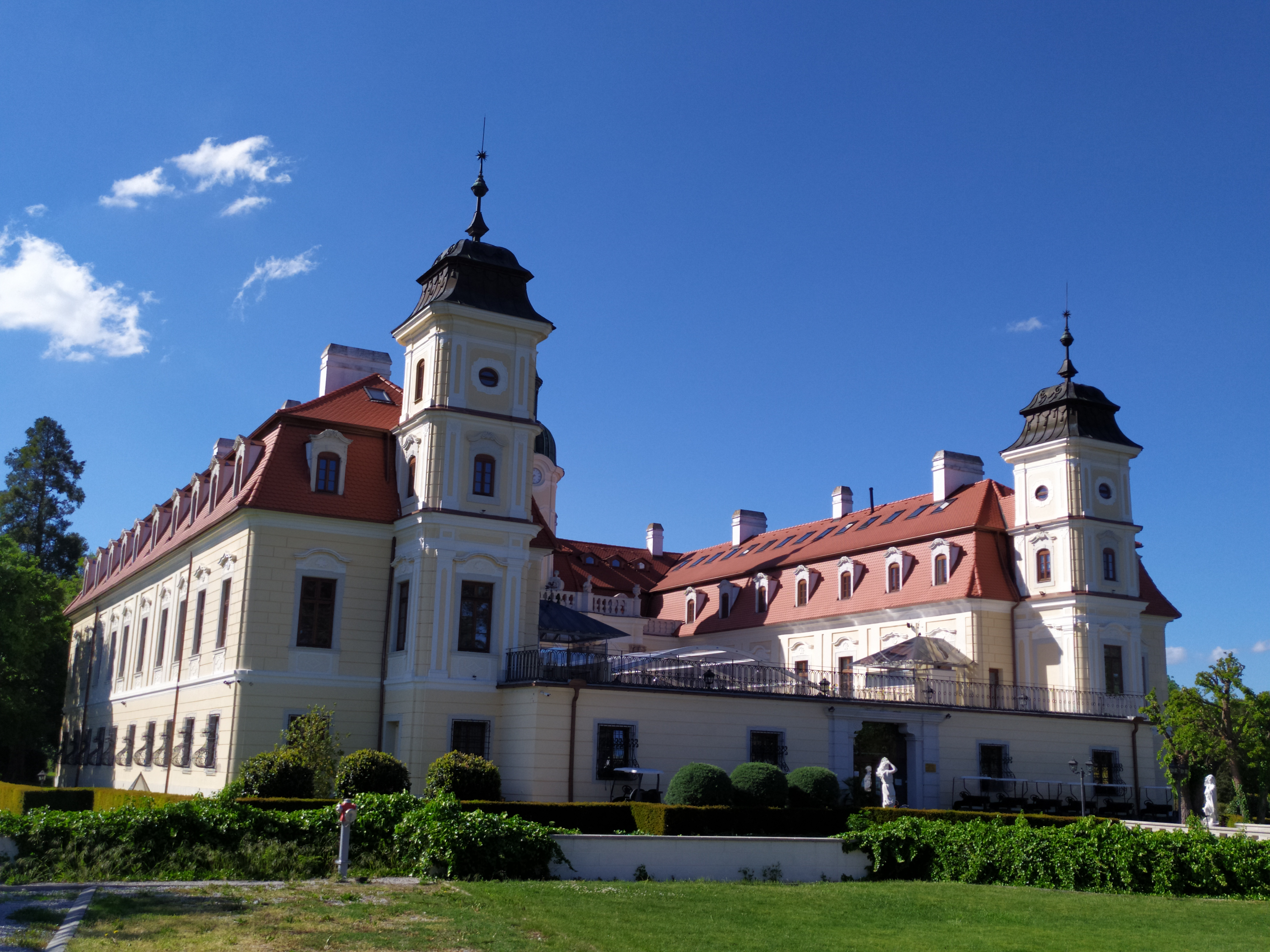
The family's castle in Cseklész, located in what is today western Slovakia

Esterházy was in the service of the Austrian monarchs and performed various administrative tasks. He was an Imperial Chamberlain and a Privy Councilor. For over forty years he held the office of the Mosonmagyaróvár governor from 1741 to 1783. In Vienna, he held the position of Director of the Court Theatre from 1752 to 1754, in whose acting troupe he found his wife. From 1762 to 1785 he was the Hungarian Court Chancellor, concurrently holding the positions of Supreme Chamberlain from 1765 to 1771, and Supreme Court Master from 1773 to 1783, in the Kingdom of Hungary. For the last two years before his death from 1783 to 1785, he was the Ban of Croatia and Slavonia.

In 1760, he was one of the founders of the Hungarian Order of Saint Stephen in 1764 and became its first Chancellor. Empress Maria Theresa showed him great honor by presenting him with the order's star decorated with diamonds. In 1771, Franz Esterházy was made a Knight of the Order of the Golden Fleece.

Francis Esterházy was a follower of Freemasonry. He founded the L'Orian lodge and became its first Grand Master.

== Personal life ==
On 6 July 1756 at Vienna, Esterházy was married to Antonia Franziska Nicoletta Richard de La Potréau (1726–1801), an actress of the Court Theatre who was born at Château-Thierry, France. Together, they had two children:

- Countess Marie Anna Eleonora Esterházy de Galántha (1757–1820), who married Count Mihály Sztáray de Nagymihály et Sztára, a son of Count Imre Sztáray de Sztára et Nagymihály. They divorced and she later married Count István Niczky de Niczk, the Lord Governor of Kőrös County who was a son of Count Kristóf Niczky de Niczk.
- Count Ferenc Esterházy de Galántha (1758–1815), who married Erzsébet Grassalkovich de Gyarak, a daughter of Antal Grassalkovich de Gyarak (a son of Count Antal Grassalkovich) and Mária Anna Esterházy de Galántha (a daughter of his distant cousin, Nikolaus I, Prince Esterházy).

Count František Esterházy of Galanta died on November 7, 1785, at his estate Cseklész (today known as Bernolákovo). His widow died in Vienna on 28 January 1801.

== Sources ==
- Markó, László: A magyar állam főméltóságai Szent Istvántól napjainkig – Életrajzi Lexikon pp. 308–309. (The High Officers of the Hungarian State from Saint Stephen to the Present Days – A Biographical Encyclopedia) (2nd edition); Helikon Kiadó Kft., 2006, Budapest; ISBN 963-547-085-1.

Political offices
Preceded by Ferenc Nádasdy	Ban of Croatia; 1783–1785	Succeeded by Ferenc Balassa
