= Andrea di Robilant =

Italian journalist and writer (born 1957)

- Born: 13 February 1957 (age 69); Rome, Italy
- Education: Institut Le Rosey; Columbia University (BA, MIA)
- Occupations: Journalist; writer; professor
- Employer: American University of Rome

Andrea di Robilant (born 13 February 1957) is an Italian journalist and writer.

== Early life and education ==
Di Robilant was born in Rome, Italy, and attended a Swiss boarding school, Institut Le Rosey. He moved to New York for university, where he earned his BA in History in 1979 from Columbia College and his MA in International Relations from the School of International and Public Affairs, Columbia University in 1980.

He is the eldest of three sons of Count Alvise Nicolis di Robilant e Cereaglio, of Piedmontese and Venetian ancestry, and American Elizabeth, née Stokes. His father, a descendant of Italian statesman and diplomat Carlo Felice Nicolis, conte di Robilant, was managing director of Sotheby's in Italy; he was found murdered in his apartment in the Palazzo Rucellai in Florence in 1997, aged 72. The murder remains unsolved.

Other members of his family include General Mario Nicolis di Robilant, who commanded the Italian Fourth Army at Monte Grappa during World War I.

His great-great-great-great grandmother, Lucia Memmo, married Alvise Mocenigo, a member of the House of Mocenigo that played a pivotal role in Venice's history. In 1818, Lucia rented the piano nobile of Palazzo Mocenigo to Lord Byron, who wrote parts of Don Juan at the family mansion, and hosted illustrious figures such as François-René de Chateaubriand and Effie Ruskin throughout her life. Lucia's father, Andrea Memmo, was the Venetian ambassador to the Papal States and a prominent citizen of the Republic of Venice. Both of di Robilant's ancestors became subjects of his books.

== Career ==
After he finished school, he was hired as a reporter for the New Jersey–based Italian-American newspaper, Il Progresso Italo-Americano. He later joined La Repubblica as a U.S. correspondent, covering the Ronald Reagan presidency, the Central American crisis, and the Falklands War. He then traveled to South America and covered local affairs for a number of publications and was The Dallas Morning News's Latin American correspondent in Buenos Aires, where he covered the end of military regimes in South America.

He returned to Italy in 1987 to start a monthly city magazine in Milan named "02" but the magazine folded only after a year, which made him return to journalism. He joined La Stampa and became its diplomatic correspondent and in 1996, he became the paper's bureau chief in Washington, D.C., where he covered Bill Clinton's second term in office.

In 2003, di Robilant wrote his first book A Venetian Affair, a biography of his ancestor, Andrea Memmo, in 18th century Venice based on his correspondence with Giustiniana Wynne found in the Palazzo Mocenigo; and a sequel entitled Lucia: A Venetian Life in the Age of Napoleon (2008) based on Andrea's daughter, Lucia Mocenigo. He subsequently left La Stampa to pursue a full-time writing career.

In 2011, he published Irresistible North: From Venice to Greenland on the Trail of the Zen Brothers, in which he analyses the claim that two Venetian merchants, the Zeno brothers, sailed over the north Atlantic in a pre-Columbian expedition to North America.

In an article in the New York Times, Sara Wheeler wrote that the main problem with the book was "evidential unreliability" and that while praising the author adds that "any chance of this flimsy tale adding up to a truly worthwhile book dies on a tidy of anachronism and cliche.

In a review in Renaissance Quarterly Elizabeth Horodowich wrote that "Di Robilant’s Irresistible North is entirely based on the question of veracity: he assumes the fourteenth-century Zen voyage to be true and attempts to prove this by following in the travelers’ footsteps across the Atlantic."

His new book, Autumn in Venice: Ernest Hemingway and His Last Muse was published in 2018.

Di Robilant lives in Rome. He is a writer and a professor at The American University of Rome.

== Personal life ==
He and his wife, Alessandra Mattirolo, have two sons, Tommaso and Sebastiano.
