= Ferenc Esterházy (1683–1754) =

Hungarian noble and politician

Count Ferenc Esterházy de Galántha (Croatian: Franjo Esterházy; 19 September 1683 – 22 November 1754) was a Hungarian noble and politician who served as Master of the Treasury from 1746 to 1754. He is considered the founder of the Cseklész branch.

== Early life ==
Esterházy was born into the noble House of Esterházy on 19 September 1683 at Pápa, Veszprém in the Kingdom of Hungary. He was the youngest son of Count Ferenc "Ferko" Esterházy de Galántha (1641–1683), who died a month after his birth, and Countess Katalin "Catharina" Thököly de Késmárk (1655–1701). Before his parents' marriage, his father was married to Countess Ilona Illeshazy.

His father was the youngest son of Count Nikolaus Esterházy de Galántha (a son of Count Ferenc Esterházy and Zsófia Illésházy), who was Palatine of Hungary from 1625 to 1645, and, his second wife, Baroness Krisztina Nyáry de Bedegh. His paternal uncle, Paul Esterházy, was created the 1st Fürst (Prince) Esterházy by the Holy Roman Emperor in 1712. (Note: To prevent the division of the Esterházy family's property, his uncle Paul I, Prince Esterházy, married his niece (Ferenc's first cousin), Countess Orsolya Esterházy of Galántha, the only child of Paul and Ferko's elder half-brother, István Esterházy, who died in 1641.) His maternal grandparents were Count István Thököly de Késmárk and Mária Gyulaffy de Ráthót.

== Career ==
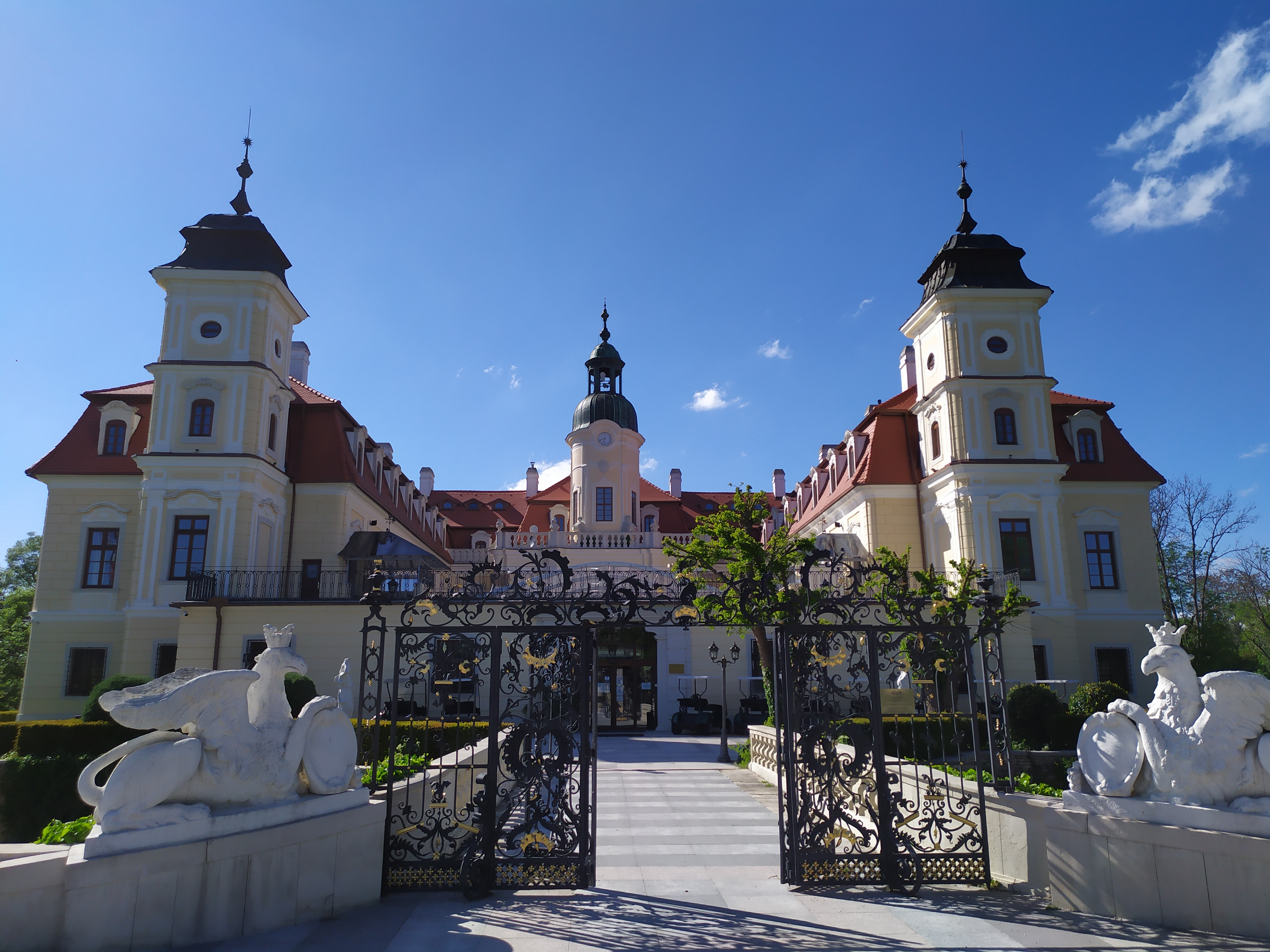
Cseklész, today in Slovakia (Bernolákovo)

Esterházy is considered the founder of the Cseklész branch of the Esterházy family, where he started construction of the Eszterházy Palace in Pápa, which was completed in 1784 by his son, Bishop Károly Esterházy.

He was the Chief Bailiff (Obergespan) of Borsod County and, after its establishment, a member of the Royal Hungarian Governor's Council. From 1746 to 1754, Esterházy served as the Master of the Treasury.

== Personal life ==
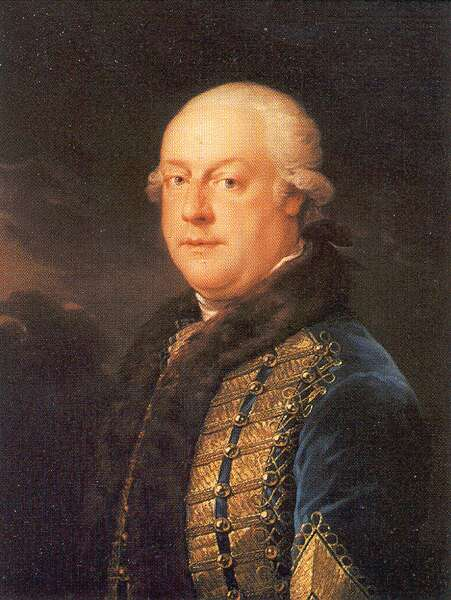
Portrait of his son, Ferenc Esterházy

Esterházy was married to Countess Maria Szidónia Pálffy ab Erdöd (1690–1743), a daughter of Count János V Pálffy ab Erdöd, the Ban of Croatia and Palatine of the Kingdom of Hungary, and, his first wife, Countess Teréz Czobor de Czoborszentmihály. Together, they were the parents of:

- Miklós "Nikolaus" Esterházy de Galántha (1711–1764), who served as the Austrian Envoy to Russia from 1753 to 1761; he married Princess Anna Lubomirska, a daughter of Prince Teodor Lubomirski, in 1744.
- János Esterházy de Galántha (b. 1713), who died young.
- Anna Terezia Esterházy de Galántha (1714–1757), who married Count Ádám III Batthyány de Németújvár in 1736.
- Ferenc Esterházy de Galántha (1715–1785), who served as Ban of Croatia from 1783 to 1785; he married Antonia de la Potréau in 1756.
- Mihály Esterházy de Galántha (1716–1741), who died unmarried.
- Maria Antonia Esterházy de Galántha (1719–1771), who married Wenzel, 1st Prince Paar, in 1743.
- József Esterházy de Galántha (1721–1776), who died unmarried.
- Katalin Esterházy de Galántha (1723–1797), who married Baron Gottfried Ignaz Waldorf von Bogetin und Ossowa.
- Károly Esterházy de Galántha (1725–1799), the Bishop of Eger and founder of the Eszterházy Károly College in Eger in 1774.
- Mária Jozefa Esterházy de Galántha (1728–1795), who married Count Joseph Karl von Windisch-Grätz, a son Count Johann Friedrich Joseph von Windisch-Grätz, in 1749.
- Mária Szidónia Esterházy de Galántha (1730–1806), who married Count Franz Xaver zu Königsegg-Aulendorf in 1750.
- Eleonora Esterhazy de Galántha (1731–1760), who married Count Frans Govaert Claude van Aspremont-Lynden, a son of Count Karel Ernst Frans van Aspremont-Lynden, in 1753.
- Philippine Esterházy de Galántha (1734–1811), who married Count Theodor Batthyany, a son of Count Lajos Batthyány and Countess Therese Kinsky von Wchinitz und Tettau, in 1756.
- László Esterházy de Galántha (d. 1747)

Esterházy died on 22 November 1754 at Schlossgarten, Sankt Margarethen im Burgenland in the Archduchy of Austria.
