= Nikolaus von Hochholzer =

German ambassador

Austrian Ambassador to Russia
- In office 30 October 1745 – 24 February 1746
- Monarch: Maria Theresa
- Preceded by: Philipp von Orsini-Rosenberg
- Succeeded by: Johann Franz von Pretlack
- In office 26 December 1742 – 22 June 1744
- Monarch: Maria Theresa
- Preceded by: Antoniotto Botta Adorno
- Succeeded by: Philipp von Orsini-Rosenberg
- In office 28 September 1732 – 11 August 1734
- Monarch: Charles VI
- Preceded by: Franz Wratislaw
- Succeeded by: Johann Franz Heinrich Carl von Ostein

Personal details
- Born: Nikolaus Sebastian Edler von Hochholzer
- Died: c. 1748

Nikolaus Sebastian Edler von Hochholzer (Note: Edler was until 1919 the lowest rank of nobility in Austria-Hungary and Germany, just beneath a Ritter (hereditary knight), but above untitled nobles, who used only the nobiliary particle von before their surnames) (died c. 1748) was a German Imperial Ambassador.

== Career ==
Hochholzer arrived in Russia on June 23, 1721. As Legation Secretary and Chargé d'affaires, he was Charles VI's acting Ambassador from the Habsburg Monarchy to the Russian Empire from 28 July 1722 to 21 December 1725 during the reign of Peter the Great. Hochholzer reported to the Supreme Court Chancellor, Count Philipp Ludwig Wenzel von Sinzendorf, that Andrey Osterman, as well as Ivan Dolgorukov and his father, sat at Peter II's bedside until his death.

In his own right, he was appointed Austrian Ambassador on 28 September 1732 during the reign of Empress Anna, succeeding Franz Wratislaw. He served as Ambassador until 11 August 1734, when he was replaced by Count Johann Franz Heinrich Carl von Ostein. During the reign of Maria Theresa and Empress Elizabeth, he again served as Ambassador, succeeding Count von Ostein's successor, Antoniotto Botta Adorno, on 26 December 1742, serving until 22 June 1744 when he was replaced by Philipp von Orsini-Rosenberg. His final term as Ambassador was from 30 October 1745 to 24 February 1746, when he was succeeded by Johann Franz von Pretlack, who brought the news of the election of Francis I as Holy Roman Emperor to Vienna and St. Petersburg.

Diplomatic posts
| Preceded by Franz Wratislaw | Austrian Ambassador to Russia; 1732–1734 | Succeeded by Johann Franz Heinrich Carl von Ostein |
| Preceded by Antoniotto Botta Adorno | Austrian Ambassador to Russia; 1742–1744 | Succeeded by Philipp von Orsini-Rosenberg |
| Preceded by Philipp von Orsini-Rosenberg | Austrian Ambassador to Russia; 1745–1746 | Succeeded by Johann Franz von Pretlack |
