= Giustiniana Wynne =

Italian writer

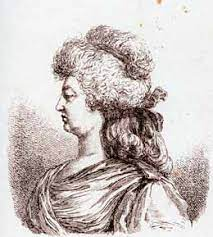
Giustiniana Wynne

Giustiniana Wynne, Countess Rosenberg-Orsini (21 January 1737 – 22 August 1791) was a Venetian writer. She features in the memoirs of Casanova and had a long secret love affair with Andrea Memmo, one of the last statesmen of the Venetian Republic.

== Early life ==
Giustiniana Wynne was born out of wedlock; this created difficulties for her later in life. Her parents were Greek-born Venetian Anna Gazini and Englishman Sir Richard Wynne. They married, and the other four siblings were born legitimate. The family was raised solely by their mother after Sir Richard's death.

Giustiniana was said to be a great beauty. At the age of sixteen, she met Andrea Memmo, the 24-year-old son of one of Venice's ruling families. The two fell in love and began a clandestine affair which lasted nearly seven years. Due to the difference in their social classes, marriage did not appear to be possible. Also, upon the discovery of Memmo's attentions to her daughter, Anna forbade them to see each other. This was to protect Giustiniana's virtue and reputation so as not to deter future suitors. These two factors led to the writing and exchange of hundreds of surreptitious letters between the lovers, some written in a secret code devised by Memmo.

After four years of secret meetings, stolen moments and public hand signals, Memmo finally urged his family to petition the Venetian authorities for permission to marry Giustiniana. As the process dragged on, the lovers grew hopeful that they would indeed be united; but just as the request was about to be approved, evidence surfaced about the dishonorable past of Giustiniana's mother, Anna. The ensuing scandal left the Wynnes no choice but to leave Venice. Anna and her five children then made their way to Paris with the hope of continuing to London where they thought to start a new life in Sir Richard's native land.

== Paris debacle ==
Following Memmo's advice, Giustiniana worked to become acquainted with Paris’ tax collector general, the wealthy widower Alexandre Jean Joseph Le Riche de La Pouplinière. She used her charms to attract his attentions, believing that a marriage to an elderly gentleman would help facilitate a future for her affair with Memmo. Just as the lovers had hoped, La Pouplinière did ask her to become his wife.

During this time, Giustiniana was pregnant but hid it as best she could and told no one. It is possible the baby was conceived with Andrea Memmo but there is no proof of this. As the wedding neared, she grew more and more desperate to rid herself of the fetus growing inside her. She eventually turned to her acquaintance, Casanova, who had escaped the prison in Venice and was in Paris the same time as she.

Giacomo Casanova, notorious Venetian and famed lover of women, detailed his interaction with Giustiniana in his memoirs, The History of My Life. In it, he describes how he tricked her into allowing him sexual intercourse by convincing her that doing so (with saffron and honey smeared on his phallus) would discharge her unwanted fetus. Casanova's “remedy” was not successful however, and Giustiniana gave birth to an unnamed son in a convent outside of Paris. The baby was given up to a family capable of raising him. Giustiniana's disappearance during this time sparked many rumors throughout Paris and then Venice, and eventually led to the end of any marriage plans with M. de La Pouplinière.

== End of the affair ==
The Wynne family finally arrived in London in 1760 and stayed for a year's time. Society there remained closed to them for the most part and the decision to return to Venice was made. During this time, letters between Giustiniana and Memmo continued. The latter had tried to go on with his life and asked her permission to take an official mistress. Their time apart had changed them and even Giustiniana conceded that she no longer had a taste for marriage. Upon the family's return to Padua, Giustiniana forbade Memmo to come to her. When eventually they did meet again, it was as fond friends.

== Later life ==
Settled again in Venice, Giustiniana accepted the hand of the Austrian ambassador to Venice, Philip Josef, Count Rosenberg-Orsini, and married him in a secret ceremony (probably) at the Embassy. Giustiniana lived with him in Palazzo Loredan until their return to Austria. She was never acknowledged by the Austrian government as a countess and after his death, she eventually made her way back to Italy. She never remarried and began to write stories, the first an account of a major celebration in Venice, the second a compilation, and the third a novel in French titled Les Morlacques. Her works were published in London and Venice and by 1786 she was considered a successful author.

On 22 August 1791, Giustiniana, Countess Rosenberg-Orsini, succumbed to (probably) uterine cancer. Andrea Memmo (by that time a former Governor of Padua, former Ambassador to Constantinople, and then Procuratore di San Marco) visited her just before her death. She was buried in the Church of San Benedetto in Padua, where a tablet in her memory can be found above the entrance portal.

== A Venetian Affair ==
In the 1990s, stacks of Memmo's letters to Giustiniana were found bundled in the attic of Palazzo Mocenigo on the Grand Canal by Mocenigo descendant, Alvise di Robilant. Upon his untimely death, his son, Andrea di Robilant, researched the letters and eventually wrote the historical work A Venetian Affair, published by Knopf in 2003.

The letters from Giustiniana to Andrea Memmo had been known to scholars many years ago, but had only told one side of the story. With di Robilant's discovery, a clearer picture began to emerge.

== Works ==
- Du sejour des comtes du Nord à Venise en Janvier MDCCLXXXII: Lettre de Mme la comtesse Douairière des Ursins, et Rosenberg à Mr. Richard Wynne, son frère, à Londres, Londra (1782)
- Moral and Sentimental Essays on miscellaneous subjects, written in retirement, on the banks of the Brenta, in the Venetian state (2 voll.), Londra, (1785)
- Pièces morales & sentimentales de Madame J.W.C. Ècrites à une Campagne, sur le Rivages de la Brenta, dans l'Ètat venitien A Londre chez Robson, New Bond Street (2 voll.), Londra (1785)
- Il trionfo de' gondolieri; ovvero novella viniziana plebea scritta in idioma francese da Madame G. W. C-t-ssa di R-s-g. Recata nell'italiano da L(odovico) A(ntonio) L(oschi), In Venezia nella stamperia Graziosi in S.Apollinare. Venezia (1786)
- Alticchiero, a Mr. Huber de Genève, J.C.D.R.(1786?)
- A André Memmo Chevalier de l'Etoile Dor et procurateur de Saint Marc, à l'occasion du mariage de sa fille Aineé avec Louis Mocenigo Venezia 30 aprile 1787: Stamperia Giuseppe Rosa. Venezia (1787)
- Alticchiero. Par Mad.e J.W.C.D.R. à Padoue. ma Venezia, per i tipi di Nicolò Bettinelli. (1787).
- Les Morlacques, Modena (1788), in collaboration with Bartolomeo Benincasa.
- Du sejour des comtes du Nord à Venise en Janvier MDCCLXXXII: Lettre de Mme la comtesse Douairière des Ursins, et Rosenberg à Mr. Richard Wynne, son frère, à Londres, Elibron Classics. Chesnut Hill (2001)
- Les Morlacques Jella: Oder Das Morlachische Madchen, Part. 1-2 (1797). Whitefish, MT (USA), Kessinger publishing (2009)

== Sources ==
In English:

- Andrea di Robilant A Venetian Affair, Knopf, 2003
- Nancy Isenberg, Without swapping her skirt for breeches: The Hypochondria of Giustiniana Wynne, Anglo-Venetian Woman of Letters in The English Malady: Enabling and Disabling Fictions edited by Glen Colburn. Cambridge, Cambridge Scholars Press 2008, pp. 154–176.
- Nancy Isenberg, "Seduction, introspection, experimentation. The epistolary code switching of Giustiniana Wynne" in "French as Language of Intimacy in the Modern Age: Le Français, Langue de l'Intime à l'Époque Moderne et Contemporaire", edited by Madeleine van Strien-Chardonneau and Marie-Christine Kok Scale. Amsterdam University Press, 2017, pp. 107–122.

In Italian:

- Bruno Brunelli, Un'amica del Casanova, Florence, Sandron, 1923
- Nancy Isenberg, Mon cher frère: Eros mascherato nell’epistolario di Giustiniana Wynne a Andrea Memmo (1758-1760), in Trame parentali/trame letterarie, a cura di M. Del Sapio, Napoli, Liguori, 2000, pp. 251–265.
- Andrea di Robilant, Un amore veneziano, Milano, Mondadori, 2003
- Justo Bonetto Le case padovane di Giustiniana Rosemberg Wynne, in L'intermédiaire des Casanovistes, XXII, Genéve 2005, pp. 21–25.
- Federico Montecuccoli degli Erri Cammei casanoviani, cap. XIII Progetti matrimoniali e matrimoni segreti di Giustiniana Wynne, Genéve 2006
- Nancy Isenberg, Seduzioni epistolari nell'età dei Lumi. L'equivoco e provocante carteggio amoroso di Giustiniana Wynne, scrittrice anglo-veneziana (1737-1791), in Quaderno del Dipartimento di Letterature Comparate. Università degli Studi Roma Tre, 2, 2006, pp. 47–70.
- Nancy Isenberg, editor, Giustiniana Wynne, Caro Memmo, mon cher frére, Treviso, Elzeviro editore, 2010. ISBN 88-87528-24-1
