= Podsedice =

- Municipality
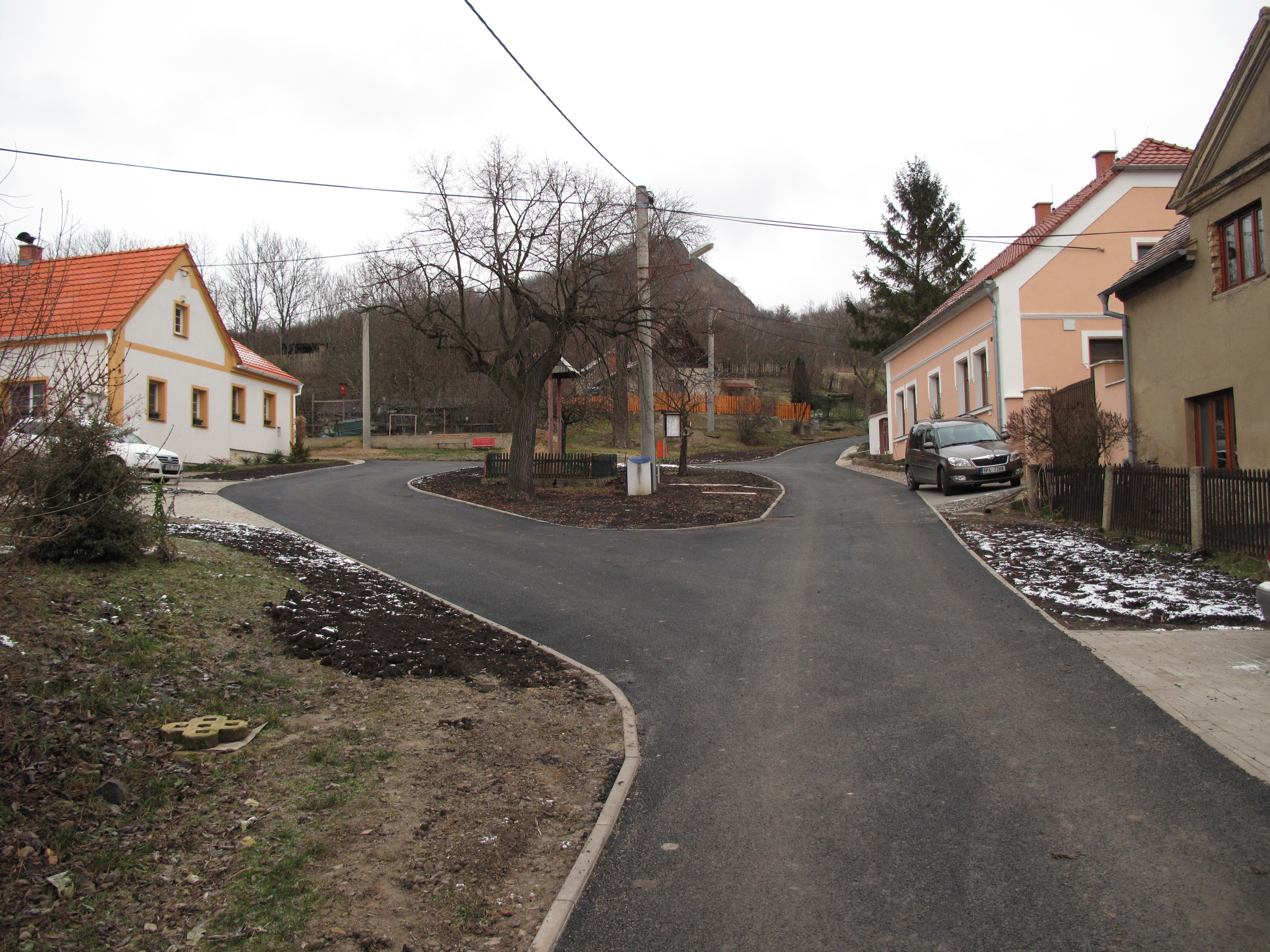
- Obřice, a part of Podsedice

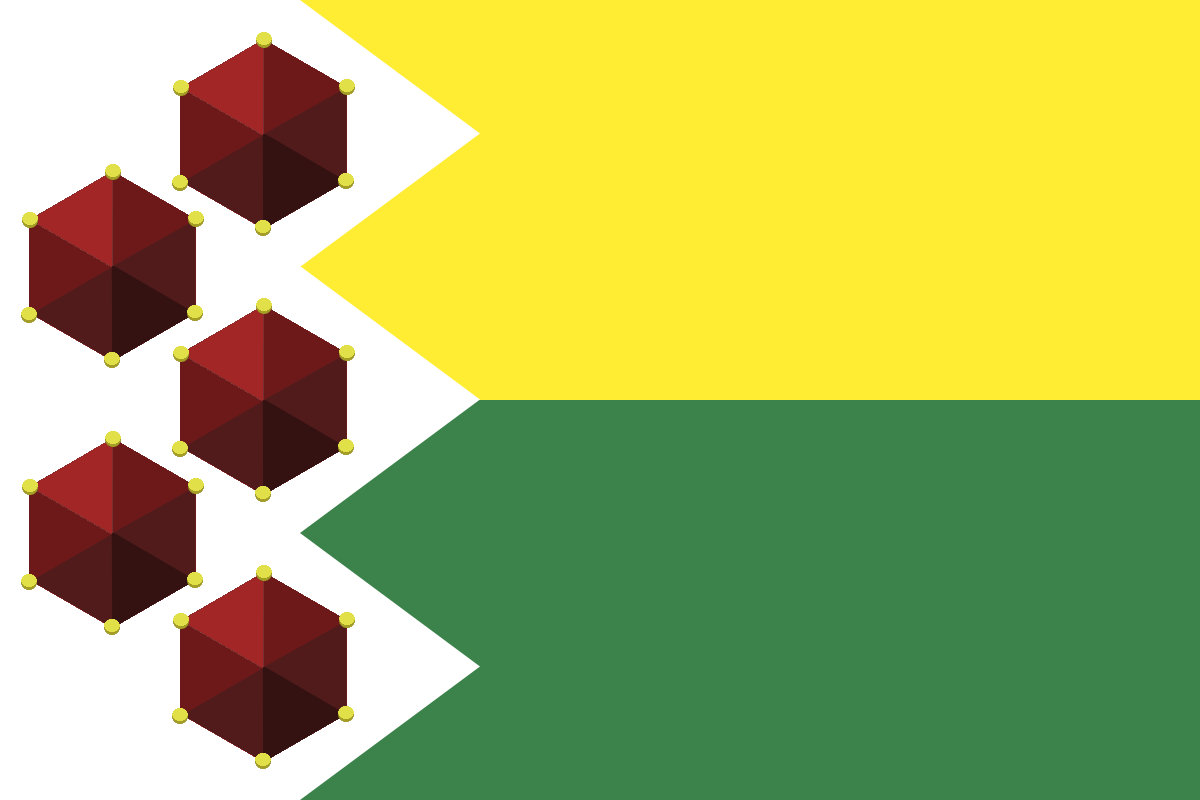
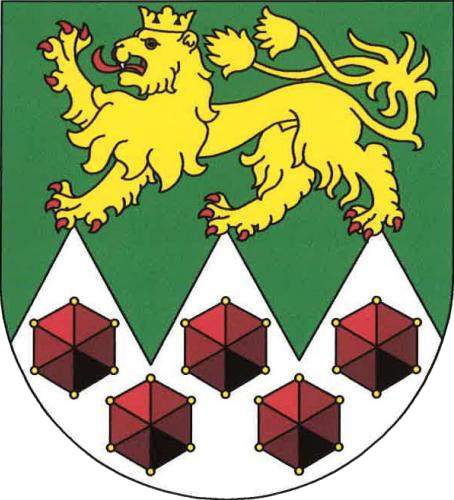
- Flag Coat of arms

- Location in the Czech Republic
- Coordinates: 50°28′19″N 13°56′54″E
- Country: Czech Republic
- Region: Ústí nad Labem
- District: Litoměřice
- First mentioned: 1280

Area
  - Total: 15.25 km^{2} (5.89 sq mi)
- Elevation: 282 m (925 ft)

Population (2026-01-01)
  - Total: 679
  - Density: 44.5/km^{2} (115/sq mi)
- Time zone: UTC+1 (CET)
  - Summer (DST): UTC+2 (CEST)
- Postal code: 411 15
- Website: www.podsedice.cz

Podsedice (German: Podseditz) is a municipality and village in Litoměřice District in the Ústí nad Labem Region of the Czech Republic. It has about 700 inhabitants.

Podsedice lies approximately 15 kilometres (9 mi) south-west of Litoměřice, 23 km (14 mi) south of Ústí nad Labem, and 54 km (34 mi) north-west of Prague.

== Administrative division ==
Podsedice consists of five municipal parts (in brackets population according to the 2021 census):

- Podsedice (391)
- Chrášťany (161)
- Děkovka (18)
- Obřice (28)
- Pnětluky (50)

== Demographics ==
Historical population
Year	Pop.	±%
1869	1,281	—
1880	1,246	−2.7%
1890	1,277	+2.5%
1900	1,301	+1.9%
1910	1,365	+4.9%
1921	1,376	+0.8%
1930	1,392	+1.2%
1950	890	−36.1%
1961	1,028	+15.5%
1970	966	−6.0%
1980	722	−25.3%
1991	602	−16.6%
2001	588	−2.3%
2011	630	+7.1%
2021	648	+2.9%
Source: Censuses
