= Dlažkovice =

- Municipality
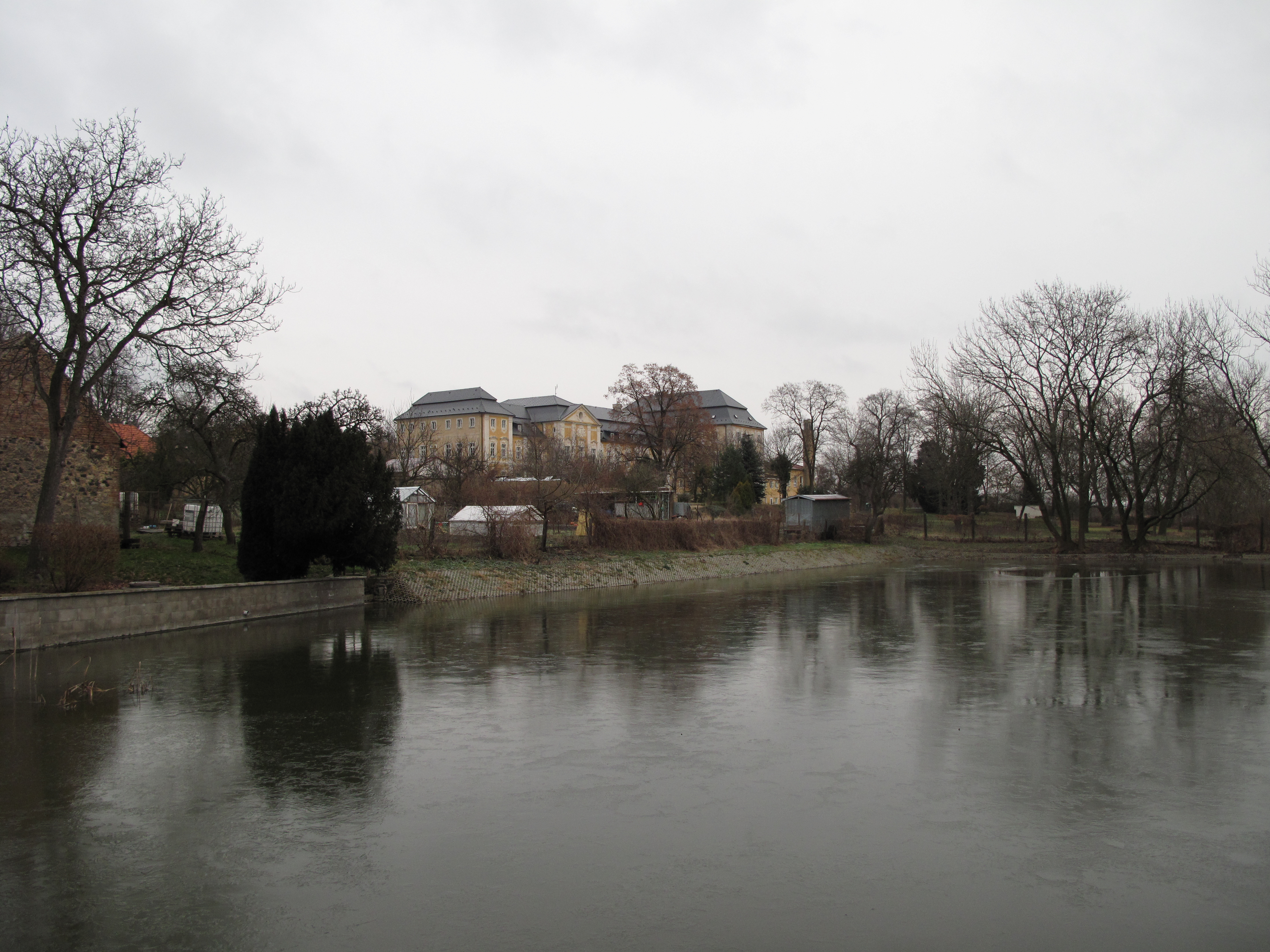
- View towards the Dlažkovice Castle

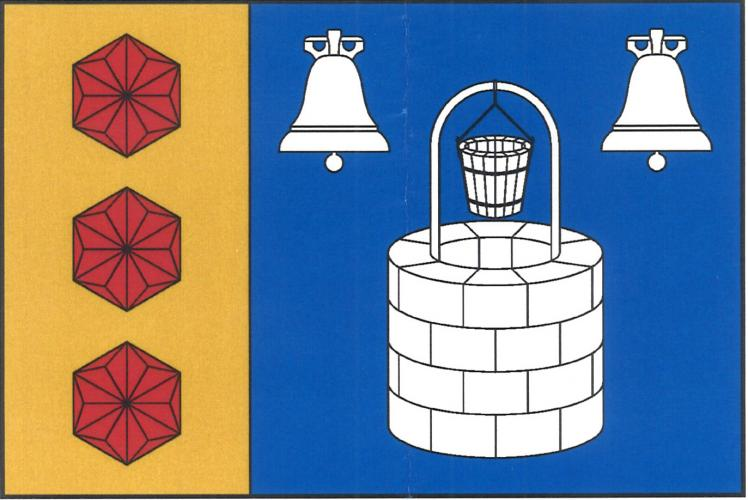
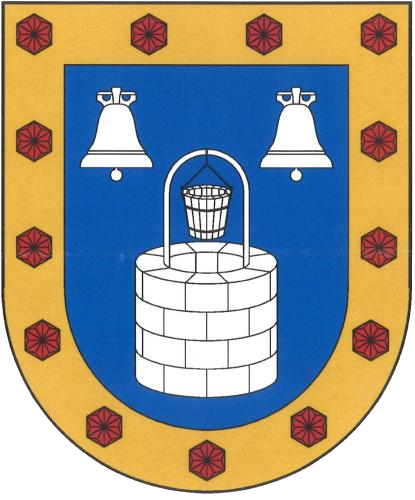
- Flag Coat of arms

- Location in the Czech Republic
- Coordinates: 50°27′56″N 13°57′54″E
- Country: Czech Republic
- Region: Ústí nad Labem
- District: Litoměřice
- First mentioned: 1057

Area
  - Total: 2.69 km^{2} (1.04 sq mi)
- Elevation: 275 m (902 ft)

Population (2026-01-01)
  - Total: 128
  - Density: 47.6/km^{2} (123/sq mi)
- Time zone: UTC+1 (CET)
  - Summer (DST): UTC+2 (CEST)
- Postal code: 411 15
- Website: www.dlazkovice.cz

Dlažkovice is a municipality and village in Litoměřice District in the Ústí nad Labem Region of the Czech Republic. It has about 100 inhabitants.

Dlažkovice lies approximately 14 kilometres (9 mi) south-west of Litoměřice, 23 km (14 mi) south of Ústí nad Labem, and 53 km (33 mi) north-west of Prague.

== Demographics ==
Historical population
Year	Pop.	±%
1869	241	—
1880	251	+4.1%
1890	271	+8.0%
1900	240	−11.4%
1910	253	+5.4%
1921	250	−1.2%
1930	232	−7.2%
1950	178	−23.3%
1961	348	+95.5%
1970	259	−25.6%
1980	178	−31.3%
1991	154	−13.5%
2001	117	−24.0%
2011	151	+29.1%
2021	170	+12.6%
Source: Censuses
