= Chlumčany (Plzeň-South District) =

- Municipality
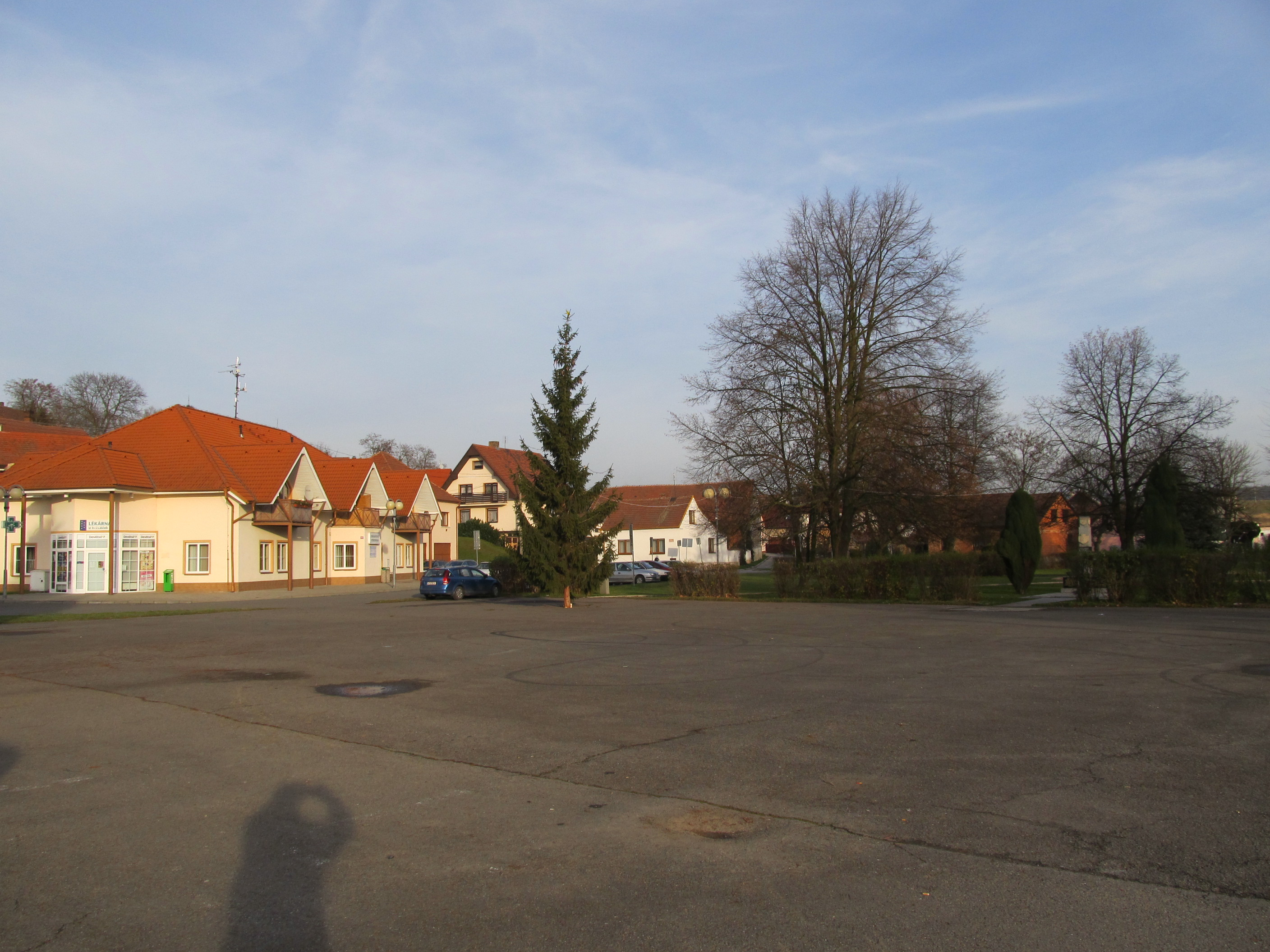
- Centre of Chlumčany

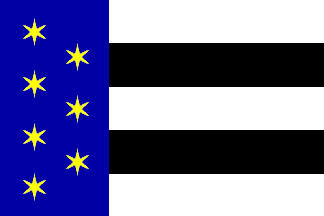
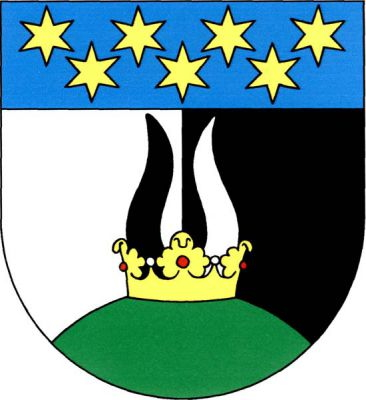
- Flag Coat of arms

- Location in the Czech Republic
- Coordinates: 49°37′50″N 13°18′30″E
- Country: Czech Republic
- Region: Plzeň
- District: Plzeň-South
- First mentioned: 1379

Area
  - Total: 9.04 km^{2} (3.49 sq mi)
- Elevation: 404 m (1,325 ft)

Population (2026-01-01)
  - Total: 2,419
  - Density: 268/km^{2} (693/sq mi)
- Time zone: UTC+1 (CET)
  - Summer (DST): UTC+2 (CEST)
- Postal code: 334 42
- Website: www.obec-chlumcany.cz

Chlumčany is a municipality and village in Plzeň-South District in the Plzeň Region of the Czech Republic. It has about 2,400 inhabitants.

== Administrative division ==
Chlumčany consists of two municipal parts (in brackets population according to the 2021 census):

- Chlumčany (2,157)
- Hradčany (129)

== Etymology ==
The name is derived from the Czech word chlum, i.e. 'forested hill'. The word chlumčan denoted a person who lived on a chlum or near a chlum.

== Geography ==
Chlumčany is located about 10 kilometres (6 mi) south of Plzeň. It lies mostly in the Švihov Highlands, only the western part of the municipal territory extends into the Plasy Uplands. The highest point is at 470 m (1,542 ft) above sea level.

== History ==
The first written mention of Chlumčany is from 1379. Until 1602, it was owned by various lesser noble families. In 1602, Chlumčany was bought by the Wratislaw of Mitrovice family. From 1712 to the 1770s, it was owned by the Morzin family. The last noble owners of Chlumčany were the Schönborn family, who acquired the estate in 1794.

== Demographics ==
Historical population

Year	Pop.	±%
1869	625	—
1880	710	+13.6%
1890	779	+9.7%
1900	974	+25.0%
1910	1,160	+19.1%

Year	Pop.	±%
1921	1,520	+31.0%
1930	1,655	+8.9%
1950	1,468	−11.3%
1961	1,605	+9.3%
1970	2,342	+45.9%

Year	Pop.	±%
1980	2,501	+6.8%
1991	2,275	−9.0%
2001	2,381	+4.7%
2011	2,353	−1.2%
2021	2,286	−2.8%

Source: Censuses

== Transport ==
The R/27 road (the section from Plzeň to Klatovy, here part of the European route E53) passes through the eastern part of the municipal territory.

Chlumčany is located on the railway line Prague–Klatovy via Plzeň.

== Sights ==
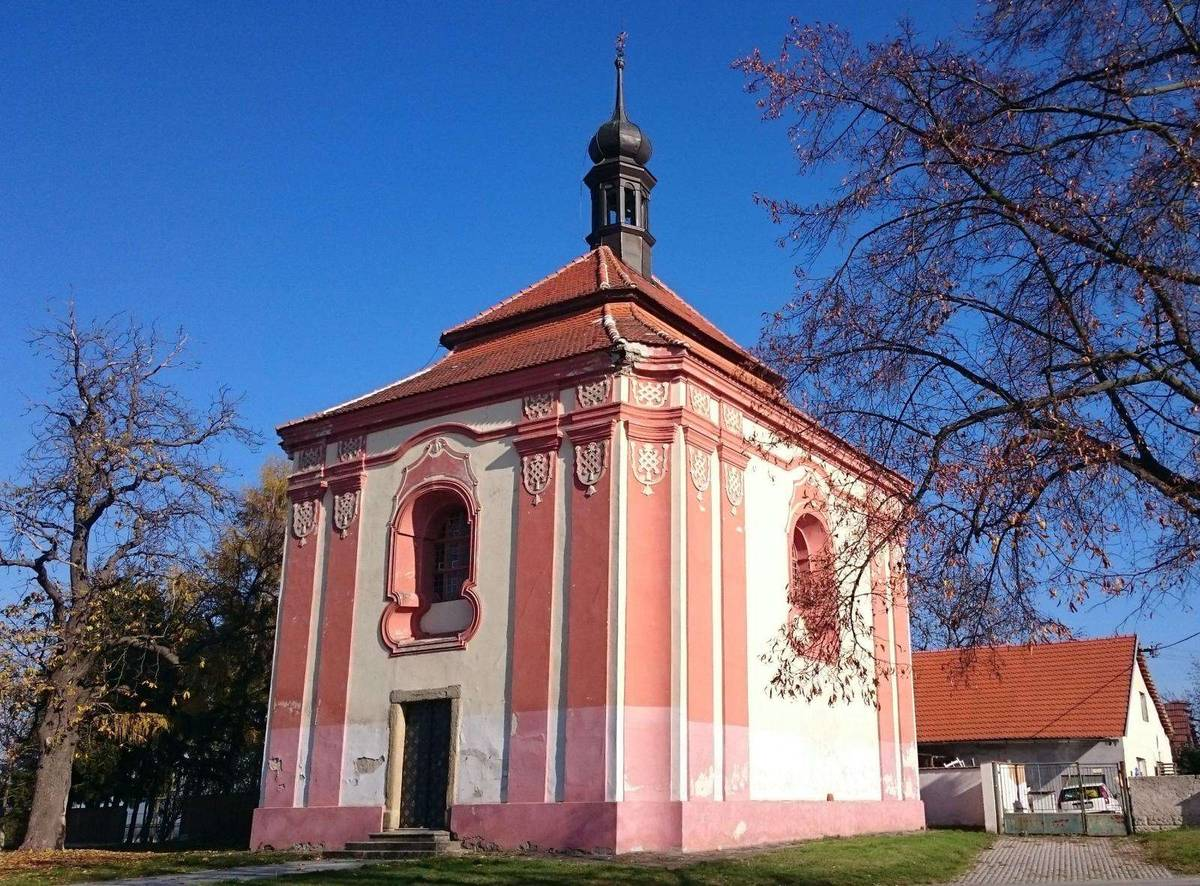
Chapel of Saint Mary of Help

The main landmark of Chlumčany is the Chapel of Saint Mary of Help. It was built in the Baroque style in 1749–1751.

A technical monument is an Art Nouveau tower-shaped water tank. It dates from 1912. In addition to its technical function, it is considered an architecturally valuable building.
