= Florimond Claude, Comte de Mercy-Argenteau =

Austrian diplomat

Florimont-Claude de Mercy-Argenteau
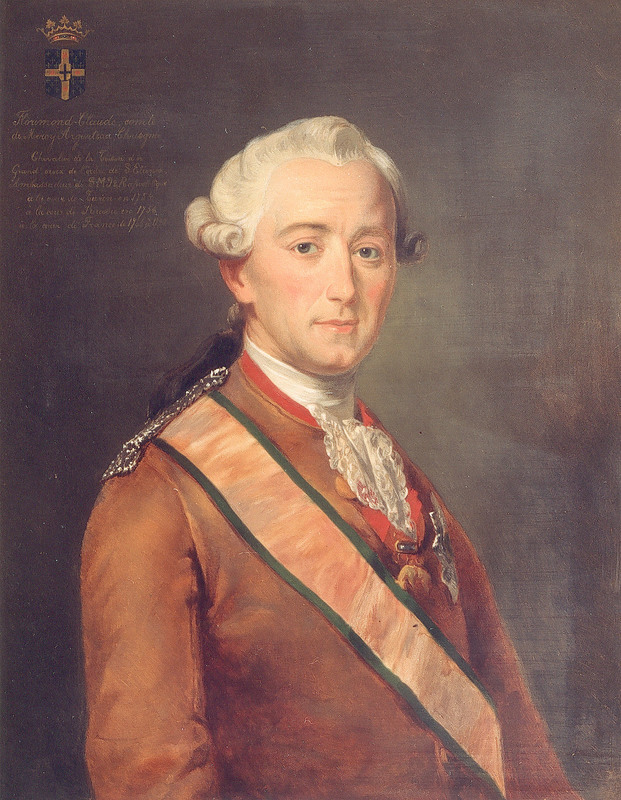
- Florimont-Claude Mercy-Argenteau (1757)

Austrian Ambassador to France
- In office 1766–1790
- Monarchs: Maria Theresa; Joseph II; Leopold II
- Preceded by: Georg Adam von Starhemberg
- Succeeded by: Franz Paul von Blumendorf

Austrian Ambassador to Russia
- In office 15 June 1761 – 6 October 1763
- Monarch: Maria Theresa
- Preceded by: Nikolaus I, Prince Esterházy
- Succeeded by: Joseph Maria Karl von Lobkowicz

Austrian Ambassador to Sardinia-Piedmont
- In office 14 June 1754 – 18 December 1760
- Monarch: Maria Theresa
- Preceded by: Georg Barré
- Succeeded by: Johann Sigismund von Khevenhüller-Metsch

Personal details
- Born: 20 April 1727 Liège, Prince-Bishopric of Liege, Holy Roman Empire
- Died: 25 August 1794 (aged 67) London, Great Britain
- Children: Alexandre Henri Joseph de Noville

Florimond Claude, comte de Mercy-Argenteau (20 April 1727 – 25 August 1794) was an Austrian diplomat and statesman of French noble ancestry in the service of the Holy Roman Empire.

== Early life ==
He was born in Liège, Prince-Bishopric of Liege, into an old noble family to Antoine Ignace Charles, Comte de Mercy-Argenteau (1692-1767), Field marshal, and his wife, Thérèse Henriette de Rouvroy de Berlus et de Pondrome (1705-1729).

== Career ==
He entered the diplomatic service of Austria in Paris in the train of Reichsfürst Wenzel Anton of Kaunitz-Rietberg. He became Austrian ambassador in Turin at the court of King Charles Emmanuel III of Sardinia, in St. Petersburg at the court of Catherine the Great, and then Austrian ambassador in Paris at the court of King Louis XV in 1766. In Paris, his first work was to strengthen the Franco-Austrian alliance, which was cemented in 1770 by the marriage of the Dauphin, afterwards Louis XVI, with Archduchess Maria Antonia Josepha Johanna of Austria, youngest daughter of Empress Maria Theresa, afterwards known as Queen Marie Antoinette.

When Louis and Marie Antoinette ascended the throne of France in 1774, Mercy-Argenteau became one of the most powerful personages at the French court due to his influence over Marie Antoinette, which made her unpopular with the French nobility and French people. He was in Paris during the turbulent years that led up to the French Revolution, and gave powerful aid to the finance ministers Étienne Charles de Loménie de Brienne and Jacques Necker. In 1792, he became governor-general of the Austrian Netherlands, where the Brabant Revolution had just been suppressed by Austria. There, his ability and experience made him a very successful governor. Although at first in favour of moderate courses, Mercy-Argenteau supported the action of Austria in making war upon its former ally after the outbreak of the French Revolution, and in July 1794, he was appointed Austrian ambassador to Britain, but he died a few days after his arrival in London.

== Private life ==
Florimond Claude never married, but had an extramarital affair with an opera singer from Palais Garnier, Claude Josèphe Rosalie Levasseur, Baronne de l'empire (1749-1826), daughter of Jean-Baptiste Levasseur. They had one son:

- Alexandre Henri Joseph de Noville (1783-1830), married Louise Wilhelmine Delacroix (1790-1818).

After Florimond's death, Rosalie married in 1806 to André Maxime de Fouchier, Seigneur de Chanvrolles (1732-1817).

=== Descendants ===
Through his son Alexandre, he was a grandfather of Loÿsa de Noville (1807-1875), who married Louis Isidore Thirion (1797-1879); had one daughter: Delphine Thirion (1831-1859), married Charles Debonnaire de Gif (1822-1866); had one daughter Loÿsa Debonnaire de Gif (1851-1927), married Paul de Boissonneaux de Chevigny (b. 1838), member of the French nobility.

== In popular culture ==
- He was played by Henry Stephenson in the 1938 film Marie Antoinette.
- He was portrayed in the 1979 anime The Rose of Versailles.
- He was played by Steve Coogan in the 2006 film of the same name.
- He was portrayed by Nathan Willcocks in 2022 TV series Marie Antoinette.
- He was portrayed by Micha Lescot in the 2023 film Jeanne du Barry.

== See also ==
- Sébastien Dubois, Inventaire des archives de la famille de Mercy-Argenteau (1334-1959), Bruxelles, Archives de l'Etat, 2009, 2 vol. (Archives de l'État à Liège. Inventaires, 110).
- T. Juste, Le Comte de Mercy-Argenteau (Brussels 1863)
- A. von Arneth and A. Geoff roy, Correspondances secretes de Marie Therese avec le comte de Mercy (Paris 1874)
- A. von Arneth and J. Flammermont, Correspondance secrete de Mercy avec Joseph II et Kaunitz (Paris 1889–1891)
- Mercy-Argenteau's Correspondances secretes de Marie Terese has been condensed and translated into English by Lilian Smythe under the title of A Guardian of Marie Antoinette (2 vols., London 1902)
