= Palazzo Loredan dell'Ambasciatore =

Coordinates: 45°25′58″N 12°19′38″E

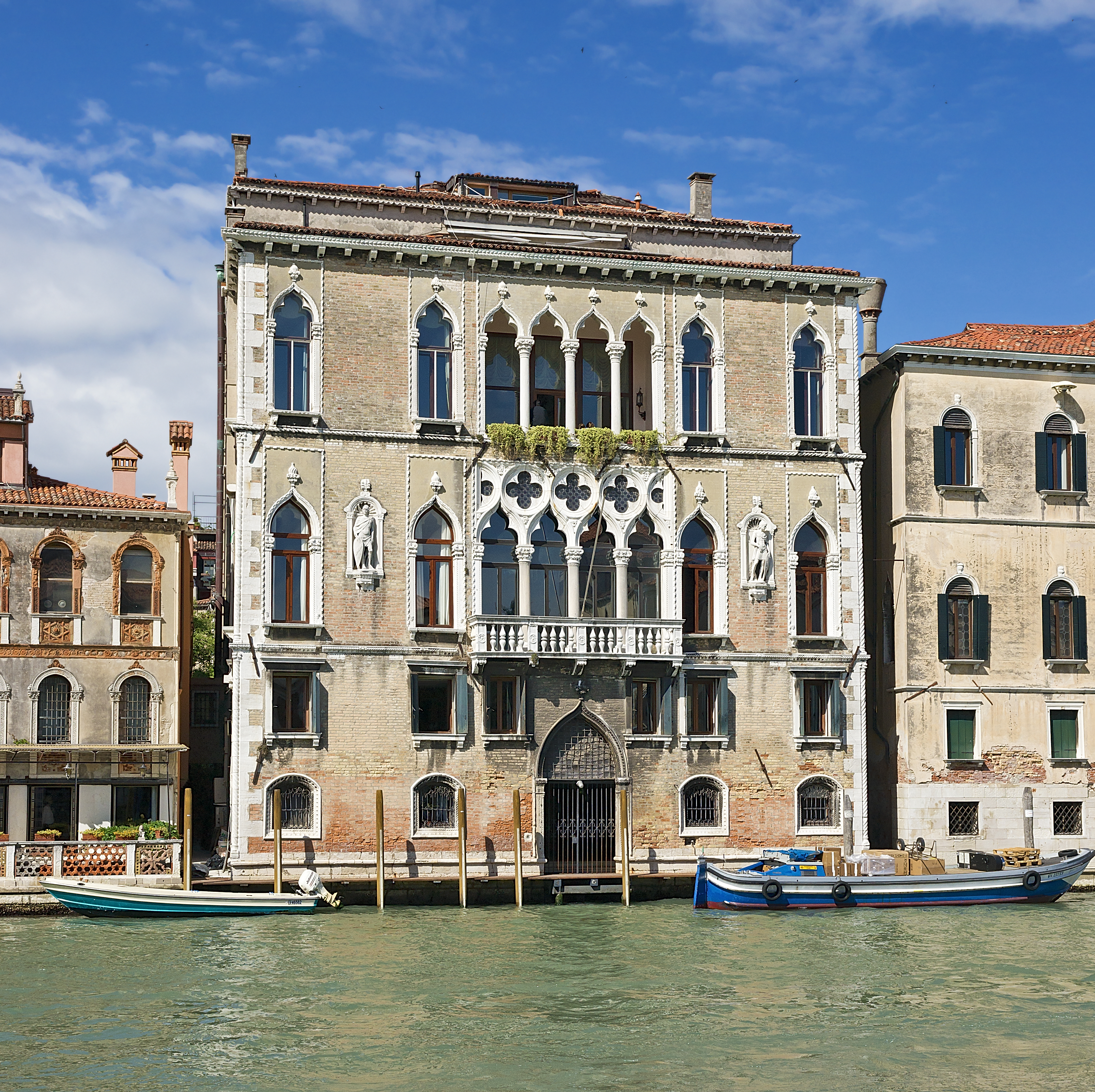
- Interactive map of the Palazzo Loredan dell'Ambasciatore area
- Etymology: offered as a residence to ambassadors of the Holy Roman Empire by Francesco Loredan

General information
- Architectural style: Venetian Gothic
- Location: Venice, Italy, Calle dei Cerchieri, Dorsoduro 1261
- Year built: 1450 – 1470
- Renovated: 1891
- Affiliation: House of Loredan

Palazzo Loredan dell'Ambasciatore is a 15th-century Gothic palace in Venice, Italy, that once belonged to the noble Loredan family. Located in the Dorsoduro sestiere (quarter), it was called "dell'Ambasciatore" because it was offered as a home of the ambassadors of the Austrian Empire to the Republic by Doge Francesco Loredan.

== History ==
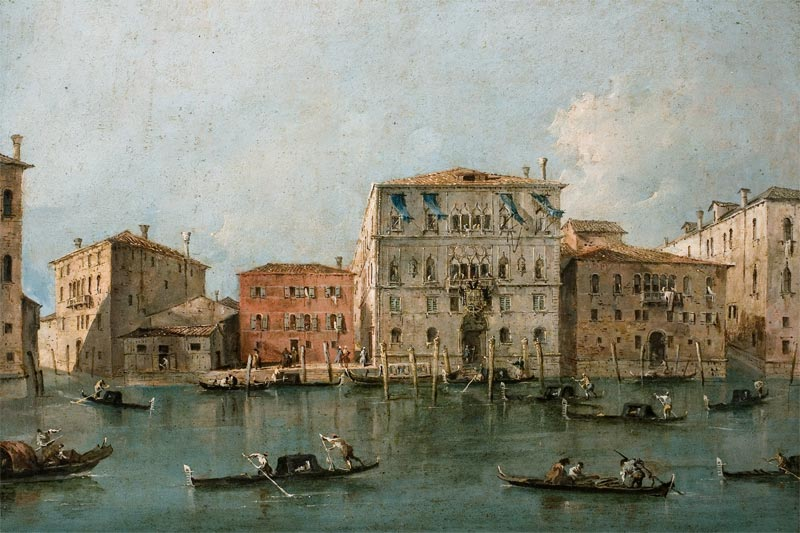
Palazzo Loredan dell'Ambasciatore, by Francesco Guardi, National Museum Cardiff

One Loredan ancestor, Antonio, was the administrator of Corfu who defeated the Turks in 1716, together with Count Johann Matthias von der Schulenburg, a Saxon general. After the battle, Count Schulenburg set up house inside the Loredan Palace, along with 25 members of his entourage and four gondoliers, and was known for his illustrious dinner parties and admirable art collection.

In 1752, another ancestor, Francesco Loredan, who later was Doge, offered the palazzo as a residence for the Ambassador of the Holy Roman Empire in exchange for 29 years of restorations. The first Imperial Ambassador to live there was Count Philip Joseph Orsini-Rosenberg who, after his arrival in Venice, married Giustiniana Wynne, a close friend of Giacomo Casanova. The couple resided together in Palazzo Loredan dell'Ambasciatore during the first years of their marriage.

These days, the Palazzo Loredan dell'Ambasciatore is owned by the Gaggia family.

== Sources ==
- Brusegan, Marcello (2005). La grande guida dei monumenti di Venezia. Rome: Newton & Compton. ISBN 88-541-0475-2.
