= Johann Franz Heinrich Carl von Ostein =

German lawyer and ambassador

Johann Franz Heinrich Carl von Ostein Count von Ostein

Austrian Ambassador to England
- In office 1740–1741
- Preceded by: Ignaz Johann von Wasner
- Succeeded by: Anton von Zöhrern

Austrian Ambassador to Russia
- In office 1734–1738
- Preceded by: Nikolaus von Hochholzer
- Succeeded by: Antoniotto Botta Adorno

Personal details
- Born: 2 February 1693 Amorbach, Electorate of Bavaria
- Died: 29 April 1742 (aged 49) Frankfurt, Landgraviate of Hesse-Darmstadt
- Spouse(s): Maria Carolina Anna Johanna von Berlepsch (m. 1732; died 1737) Maria Clara Elisabeth von Eltz-Kempenich (m. 1741; died 1742)
- Relations: Johann Friedrich Karl von Ostein (brother); Melchior Friedrich von Schönborn-Buchheim (grandfather); Johann Philipp Franz von Schönborn (uncle); Friedrich Karl von Schönborn-Buchheim (uncle); Damian Hugo Philipp von Schönborn-Buchheim (uncle); Rudolf Franz Erwein von Schönborn (uncle); Anselm Franz von Schönborn (uncle); Franz Georg von Schönborn (uncle)
- Children: 4
- Parent(s): Anna Karolina Maria von Schönborn; Johann Franz Sebastian von Ostein

Count Johann Franz Heinrich Carl von Ostein (2 February 1693 – 29 April 1742) was a German lawyer, Imperial Privy Councilor and Imperial Ambassador.

== Early life ==
Count von Ostein was born on 2 February 1693 in Amorbach. He was the son of Anna Karolina Maria von Schönborn and Johann Franz Sebastian von Ostein (1652–1718). His father sold his inherited property, including the ancestral Schloss Ostein which was destroyed in the Thirty Years' War, to the Antoniter Commandery of Isenheim in Alsace. In 1710 he bought an estate in the Kingdom of Bohemia, the Maleschau lordship (today Malešov), for 400,000 guilders. He also acquired the lands of the Ehrenfels Castle in Hesse of the Elector of Mainz. Ehrenfels Castle was destroyed by the French after it was conquered and before their retreat in 1689 during the Nine Years' War. The ruins were abandoned and part of the property went to Johann Franz Sebastian von Ostein. Among his siblings were Johann Friedrich Karl von Ostein, the Archbishop of Mainz, Elector of Mainz, and Prince-Bishop of Worms, and Lothar Johann Hugo Franz von Ostein, also Electorate of Mainz, Eichstätt and Augsburg Privy Councillor.

One of his ancestors was Johann Heinrich von Ostein, Prince-Bishop of Basel during the Thirty Years' War. His maternal grandparents were Count Melchior Friedrich von Schönborn-Buchheim and Baroness Maria Anna Sophia Johanna von Boyneburg-Lengsfeld (a daughter of Johann Christian von Boyneburg). Among his maternal family were uncles, Johann Philipp Franz von Schönborn, the Prince-Bishop of Würzburg,Friedrich Karl von Schönborn-Buchheim, the Prince-Bishop of Würzburg and Prince-Bishop of Bamberg who served as Vice-Chancellor of the Holy Roman Empire under Joseph I, Damian Hugo Philipp von Schönborn-Buchheim, the Prince-Bishop of Speyer and Bishop of Konstanz, Rudolf Franz Erwein von Schönborn, a diplomat and composer, Anselm Franz von Schönborn, and Franz Georg von Schönborn, the Elector and Archbishop of Trier who was also Prince-Bishop of Worms and Prince-Provost of Ellwangen.

== Career ==
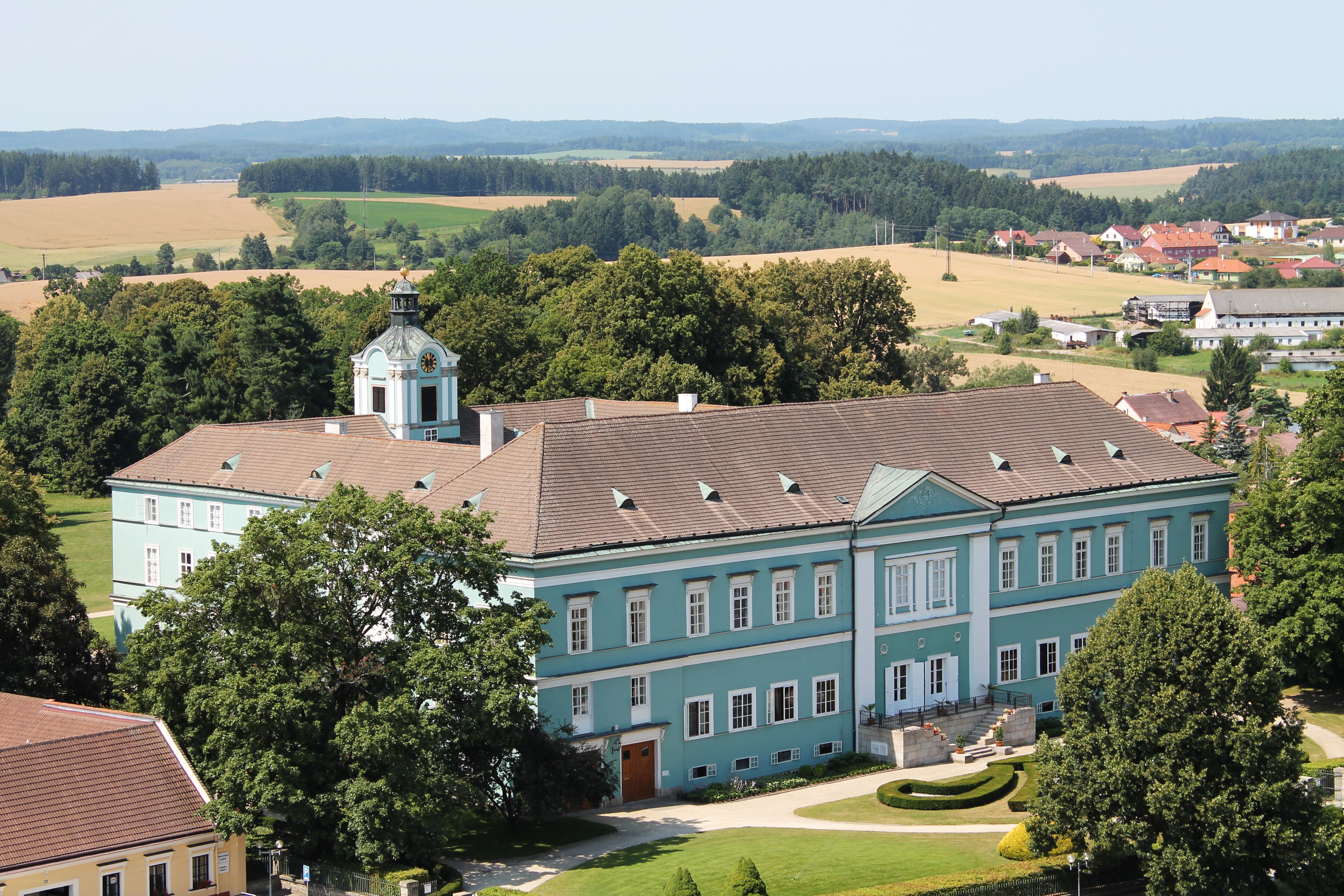
Dačice Castle

Ostein received a legal education and was appointed to the Aulic Council ("Court Council of the Empire") in 1725. For more than five years, from October 1734 to January 29, 1739, he was Austrian Envoy to the Russian Court in St. Petersburg for Emperor Charles VI and later, briefly, to the Royal English Court, first in Hanover and then in London. Shortly before his death in 1741, he became President of the Imperial Court Council in Frankfurt am Main.

In 1728, he bought the Datschitz estate (today "Dačice"), including the Castle there, from Count Franz Maximilian zu Fürstenberg in the southernmost tip of the Margraviate of Moravia for 430,000 guilders. His father had already purchased the Maleschau estate in the Kingdom of Bohemia, near the royal silver mining town of Kuttenberg ("Kutná Hora") and the nearby market town of Suchdol, from Count Franz Anton von Sporck for 400,000 guilders in 1710. The purchase included the Maselov fortress and chateau, as well as the Roztěž hunting lodge, built in 1669 by Count Johann von Sporck. The purchase also included admission to the Bohemian countship (in modern-day Czech Republic). This chateau, later rebuilt in the Empire style by one of his heirs, fell into disrepair after World War II and was purchased from the Czech Republic in 2002 by Taiwanese billionaire Terry Gou, CEO of Foxconn, for $30 million, which he fully renovated.

== Personal life ==
Count von Ostein was twice married. His first wife, Countess Maria Carolina Anna Johanna von Berlepsch and heiress of Myllendonk (1707–1737), was 14 years younger than him. The Lordship of Myllendonk descended to her from her grandmother, Marie Gertrude, Countess of Berlepsch (1654–1723) and later Princely Abbess. As a young widow, she accompanied the future second wife of Charles II of Spain, Maria Anna of Neuburg, to her wedding. On 4 May 1690, Maria Anna married the childless King Charles II of Spain as his second wife in the monastery of San Diego near Valladolid at the instigation of his mother, Mariana of Austria. Through marriage she became Queen of Spain, Naples, Sicily and Sardinia and Duchess of Milan. After the death of her husband, Maria Anna lived in Toledo with her confessor Gabriel and her confidante Marie Gertrude, Countess of Berlepsch, who were instrumental in Maria Anna's government. In 1699, the Countess of Berlepsch bought the lordship of Myllendonk from the Count of Croÿ. Before her death in St. Petersburg shortly after the birth of her third child, they were the parents of:

- Johanne Maria Charlotte Friderica von Ostein (1733–1821), who married the influential statesman Carl Friedrich Hatzfeldt zu Gleichen in 1755.
- Johann Friedrich Karl Maximilian von Ostein (1735–1809), the last bearer of the family name who died unmarried.
- Johann Carl Franz Hugo Maria von Ostein (1736–1736), who died in birth.

After his wife's death, the Lordship of Myllendonk passed through him to their son Johann Friedrich Carl Maximilian Amor, Count of Ostein. Less than a year before his death, he remarried in 1741 in Frankfurt am Main to Maria Clara Elisabeth von Eltz-Kempenich (1720–1786). She was a member of the family of the then ruling Elector and Archbishop of Mainz and Imperial Archchancellor of the Holy Roman Empire of the German Nation, Philipp Karl von Eltz-Kempenich. Her sister, Baroness Maria Sophie Anna von Eltz-Kempenich became the wife of the Electorate of Mainz Privy Councillor Franz Heinrich von Dalberg, Burggrave of Friedberg, Governor of Worms and Chief Bailiff of Oppenheim. They were the parents of Karl Theodor Anton Maria von Dalberg, the Prince-Primate of the Confederation of the Rhine as appointed by Napoleon in 1806. From their brief marriage, they were the parents of one son, born after his death:

- Philipp Franz Karl von Ostein (1742–1766), who became a canon of Mainz, Trier and Würzburg, before his own death at the age of 24.

Count von Ostein died on 29 April 1742 in Frankfurt. After his death, his Countess lived as a widow for 45 years after their short marriage before her own death on 13 June 1786.

Diplomatic posts
Preceded by Nikolaus von Hochholzer	Austrian Ambassador to Russia; 1734–1738	Succeeded by Antoniotto Botta Adorno
Preceded by Ignaz Johann von Wasner	Austrian Ambassador to England; 1740–1741	Succeeded by Anton von Zöhrern
