= List of ambassadors of Austria-Hungary to the United Kingdom =

This is a list of the heads of mission from the Habsburg Monarchy, Austrian Empire, and later Austria-Hungary, to the Court of St James's in London.

== Heads of Mission ==
=== Habsburg Envoy ===
- 1677-1679: Charles Ferdinand, Count of Waldstein
- 1680-1685: Franz Sigismund von Thurn und Taxis
- 1685-1687: Georg Adam Martinitz
- 1687-1687: Dominik Andreas von Kaunitz ("vicelegato")
- 1690-1690: Sigismund Wilhelm von Königsegg
- 1691-1693: Heinrich Johann Franz von Strattmann
- 1694-1700: Leopold von Auersperg
- 1701-1703: Johann Wenzel Wratislaw von Mitrowitz
- 1705-1711: Johann Wenzel von Gallas
- 1715-1717: Otto Christoph von Volckra
- 1717-1718: Johann Christoph Pentenriedter
- 1724-1727: Conrad Sigmund von Starhemberg
- 1726-1727: Karl Joseph von Palm
- 1727-1728: Giulio Visconti Borromeo Arese
- 1728-1736: Philipp Joseph Kinsky
- 1736-1740: Ignaz Johann Wasner
- 1740-1741: Johann Franz Heinrich Carl von Ostein
- 1741-1743: Anton von Zöhrern
- 1743-1748: Ignaz Johann von Wasner
- 1748-1749: Anton von Zöhrern
- 1749-1752: Heinrich von Richecourt
- 1752-1753: Anton von Zöhrern
- 1753-1757: Carl Ludwig von Colloredo
- 1757-1763: vacant
- 1763-1769: Christian August von Seiler
- 1769-1770: Johann Lukas von Raigersfeld
- 1770-1782: Ludovico, Count di Belgiojoso
- 1782-1786: Johann Friedrich von Kageneck
- 1786-1790: Karl Emeryk Aleksander Reviczky von Revisnye
- 1790-1793: Johann Philipp Stadion, Count von Warthausen
- 1793-1800: Ludwig, Prince of Starhemberg

=== Ambassador Extraordinary and Plenipotentiary of the Austrian Empire ===
- 1800-1810: Ludwig, Prince of Starhemberg
- 1810-1814: vacant
- 1814-1815: Maximilian, Count of Merveldt
- 1815–1815: Baron Philipp von Neumann
- 1815–1842: Paul III Anton, Prince Esterházy
- 1843–1844: Baron Philipp von Neumann
- 1844–1848: Count Jan Moritz von Dietrichstein-Proskau-Leslie

=== Envoy Extraordinary and Minister Plenipotentiary ===
- 1849–1849: Count Franz de Paula von Colloredo-Wallsee
- 1851–1852: Count Karl Ferdinand von Buol-Schauenstein
- 1852–1856: Count Franz de Paula von Colloredo-Wallsee
- 1856–1860: Count Rudolf Apponyi

=== Ambassador Extraordinary and Plenipotentiary ===
- 1860–1871: Count Rudolf Apponyi
- 1871–1878: Count Friedrich Ferdinand von Beust
- 1878–1888: Count Alajos Károlyi
- 1888–1903: Count Franz von Deym von Stritez
- 1904–1914: Count Albert Mensdorff-Pouilly, von Dietrichstein zu Nikolsburg

== See also ==
- List of diplomatic missions of Austria-Hungary
