= List of ambassadors of Austria to Russia =

Ambassadors of Austria to Russia

Ambassador
- Coat of arms of Austria
- Incumbent; Werner Almhofer since 2021
- Ministry of Foreign Affairs; Embassy of Austria, Moscow
- Style: His Excellency
- Website: Austrian Embassy, Moscow

The ambassador of the Republic of Austria to Russia is the Republic of Austria's foremost diplomatic representative in Russia. As head of Austria's diplomatic mission there, the ambassador is the official representative of the president and government of Austria to the Russian Federation. The position has the rank and status of an Ambassador Extraordinary and Minister Plenipotentiary and the embassy is located in Moscow.

== History ==
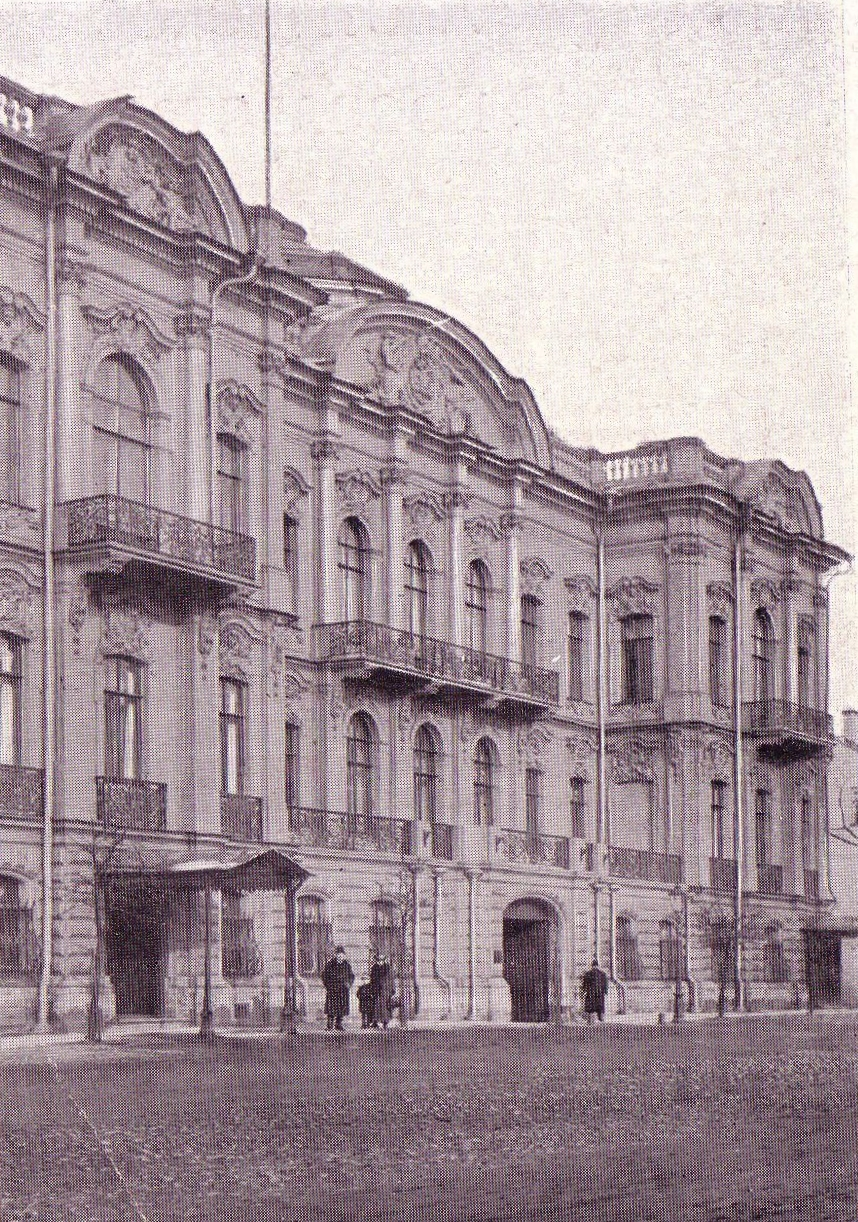
From 1880 to 1918 the Austro-Hungarian Embassy was Sergejewskaja 10, Saint Petersburg, 1914.

In 1703 Peter I founded Saint Petersburg, which was the capital of the Russian Empire from 1710 to 1918. Until 1880, the Austrian embassy was located there at 102 Fontanka River Embankment, (Anglijskaja Nabereschnaja, English Quay).

On 6 August 1914 Franz Joseph I declared war on Tsar Nicholas II and Denmark became a protecting power in Russia.

At the beginning of July 1918 Consul General Georg de Pottere (1875–1951) was sent to Moscow "to settle the questions of the resumption of Russian public debt service left open in the Treaty of Brest-Litovsk." The negotiations ended in the last days of July. On 11 July 1918 the Moscow government granted the agreement to Otto von Franz, who was appointed ambassador to Moscow on 6 August 1918. Neither Georg de Pottere nor Otto von Franz took office before 9 November 1918.

After the collapse of the Soviet Union in 1990/91, the ambassador was responsible for almost all successor states but were, eventually replaced by new embassies. As of 2015 the official area consists of Belarus and the Russian Federation ("Russia"), the Austrian Embassy in Moscow also entrusts Armenia (which has had an ambassador at the Ministry of Foreign Affairs since 2012), and Uzbekistan in its consular district.

== Heads of Mission ==
1700: Establishment of diplomatic relations

Appointed / Accredited	Name	Title/notes	Appointed during	Accredited during	Left post
1526 Austria → Russia					
20 June 1721	Stephan Wilhelm Kinsky		Charles VI	Peter I	28 July 1722
28 July 1722	Nikolaus von Hochholzer	Chargé d'affaires	Charles VI	Peter I	21 December 1725
21 December 1725	Amadeus de Bussy-Rabutin		Charles VI	Catherine I	30 August 1727
30 August 1727	Lorenz von Caramé	Chargé d'affaires	Charles VI	Catherine I	26 June 1728
26 June 1728	Franz Wratislaw		Charles VI	Peter II	28 September 1732
28 September 1732	Nikolaus von Hochholzer		Charles VI	Anna	11 August 1734
11 August 1734	Johann Franz Heinrich Carl von Ostein		Charles VI	Anna	17 December 1738
17 December 1738	Antoniotto Botta Adorno		Charles VI	Anna	9 October 1742
26 December 1742	Nikolaus von Hochholzer		Maria Theresa	Elizabeth	22 June 1744
22 June 1744	Philipp von Orsini-Rosenberg		Maria Theresa	Elizabeth	1 September 1745
30 October 1745	Nikolaus von Hochholzer		Maria Theresa	Elizabeth	24 February 1746
24 February 1746	Johann Franz von Pretlack	Ambassador	Maria Theresa	Elizabeth	19 May 1748
20 May 1748	Josef Bernes	Ambassador	Maria Theresa	Elizabeth	17 April 1751
18 September 1751	Johann Franz von Pretlack	Ambassador	Maria Theresa	Elizabeth	10 January 1753
16 April 1753	Miklós Esterházy de Galantha	Ambassador	Maria Theresa	Elizabeth	22 May 1761
15 June 1761	Florimond Claude von Mercy-Argenteau	Ambassador	Maria Theresa	Elizabeth	6 October 1763
3 November 1763	Joseph Maria Karl von Lobkowitz		Maria Theresa	Catherine II	25 May 1777
15 June 1777	Josef von Kaunitz-Rietberg		Maria Theresa	Catherine II	12 September 1779
24 October 1779	Johann Ludwig von Cobenzl		Maria Theresa	Catherine II	25 April 1784
25 April 1784	Johann Ludwig von Cobenzl	Ambassador	Joseph II	Catherine II	17 May 1800
17 May 1800	Johann Locatelli	Chargé d'affaires	Joseph II	Paul I	18 August 1801
18 August 1801	Franz von Saurau	Ambassador	Francis II	Alexander I	16 October 1802
16 October 1802	Josef von Hudelist	Chargé d'affaires	Francis II	Alexander I	28 April 1803
28 April 1803	Johann Philipp von Stadion	Ambassador	Francis II	Alexander I	1 October 1805
1804 Austria → Russia			Francis II	Alexander I	
1 October 1805	Teodoro Sanchez d’Aguilar	Chargé d'affaires in Riga	Francis II	Alexander I	14 August 1806
14 August 1806	Maximilian von Merveldt	Ambassador	Francis II	Alexander I	2 May 1808
1806	Karl Binder von Krieglstein	Chargé d'affaires	Francis II	Alexander I	
27 December 1808	Karl Philipp zu Schwarzenberg	Ambassador	Francis II	Alexander I	28 May 1809
1808	Interruption of relations		Francis II	Alexander I	
26 October 1809	Josef von Saint-Julien		Francis II	Alexander I	23 June 1812
1809	Position vacant		Francis II	Alexander I	
6 June 1815	Johann von Provost	Chargé d'affaires	Francis II	Alexander I	19 April 1816
19 April 1816	Ludwig von Lebzeltern		Francis II	Alexander I	
1816	Heinrich von Bombelles	Chargé d'affaires	Francis II	Alexander I	
10 June 1827	Stephan Zichy	Ambassador	Francis II	Nicholas I	21 June 1828
1827	Maximilian von Kaiserfeld	Chargé d'affaires	Francis II	Nicholas I	
17 January 1829	Karl Ludwig von Ficquelmont	Ambassador	Francis II	Nicholas I	2 August 1840
1829	Otto von Meysenbug	Chargé d'affaires	Francis II	Nicholas I	
1843	Franz de Paula von Colloredo-Wallsee		Ferdinand I	Nicholas I	1847
29 November 1848	Karl Ferdinand von Buol-Schauenstein		Franz Joseph I.	Nicholas I	13 February 1851
1848	Eduard von Lebzelten-Collenbach	Chargé d'affaires	Franz Joseph I.	Nicholas I	
13 February 1851	Franz von Colloredo-Wallsee	Ambassador	Franz Joseph I.	Nicholas I	
1851	Eduard von Lebzelten-Collenbach	Chargé d'affaires	Franz Joseph I.	Nicholas I	
29 April 1852	Alexander von Mensdorff-Pouilly		Franz Joseph I.	Nicholas I	5 November 1853
5 November 1853	Valentin von Esterházy		Franz Joseph I.	Nicholas I	2 November 1858
1853	Emmerich Széchényi	Chargé d'affaires	Franz Joseph I.	Nicholas I	
14 November 1859	Friedrich von Thun und Hohenstein		Franz Joseph I.	Alexander II	26 December 1862
1859	Friedrich Revertera von Salandra	Chargé d'affaires	Franz Joseph I.	Alexander II	
18 July 1864	Friedrich Revertera von Salandra		Franz Joseph I.	Alexander II	14 April 1868
1864	Albin von Vetsera	Chargé d'affaires	Franz Joseph I.	Alexander II	
1867 Austria-Hungary → Russia			Franz Joseph I.	Alexander II	
14 October 1869	Boguslaw Chotek von Chotkow		Franz Joseph I.	Alexander II	11 September 1871
18 September 1871	Ferdinand von Langenau	Ambassador from 4 March 1874	Franz Joseph I.	Alexander II	12 January 1880
26 January 1880	Gustav Kálnoky	Ambassador	Franz Joseph I.	Alexander II	20 November 1881
1880	Konstantin von Trauttenberg	Chargé d'affaires	Franz Joseph I.		
8 March 1882	Anton von Wolkenstein-Trostburg	Ambassador	Franz Joseph I.	Alexander III	28 October 1894
1882	Franz I von und zu Liechtenstein	Chargé d'affaires	Franz Joseph I.	Alexander III	
1884	Anton von Wolkenstein-Trostburg		Franz Joseph I.	Alexander III	
1884	Franz I von und zu Liechtenstein		Franz Joseph I.	Alexander III	1898
26 January 1899	Alois Lexa von Aehrenthal		Franz Joseph I.	Alexander III	24 October 1906
28 December 1906	Leopold Berchtold	Ambassador	Franz Joseph I.	Nicholas II	25 March 1911
25 March 1911	Douglas von Thurn und Valsássina	Ambassador	Franz Joseph I.	Nicholas II	1 October 1913
1 October 1913	Friedrich von Szápáry	Ambassador	Franz Joseph I.	Nicholas II	6 August 1914
1918 Austria → Soviet Union
1924	Otto Pohl		Rudolf Ramek	Mikhail Kalinin	1927
1945	Karl Waldbrunner		Leopold Figl	Mikhail Kalinin	May 1946
May 1946	Karl Braunias		Leopold Figl	Nikolai Shvernik	November 1946
November 1946	Norbert Bischoff		Leopold Figl	Nikolai Shvernik	
1960	Heinrich Haymerle		Julius Raab	Leonid Brezhnev	1964
1964	Walter Wodak		Josef Klaus	Anastas Mikoyan	1970
1970	Heinrich Haymerle		Bruno Kreisky	Nikolai Podgorny	1974
1975	Heinz Standenat		Bruno Kreisky	Nikolai Podgorny	
1978	Gerald Hinteregger		Bruno Kreisky	Leonid Brezhnev	1981
1981	Helmut Liedermann		Bruno Kreisky	Leonid Brezhnev	1986
1985	Herbert Grubmayr		Fred Sinowatz	Andrei Gromyko	
1991 Austria → Russia
1992	Friedrich Bauer		Franz Vranitzky	Boris Yeltsin	24 September 1995
1999	Franz Cede		Viktor Klima	Vladimir Putin	2003
2003	Martin Vukovich		Wolfgang Schüssel	Vladimir Putin	2009
2009	Margot Klestil-Löffler	Ambassador	Werner Faymann	Dmitry Medvedev	2014
19 January 2015	Emil Brix		Werner Faymann	Vladimir Putin	2017
11 December 2017	Johannes Eigner			Vladimir Putin	2021
2021	Werner Almhofer			Vladimir Putin	

== See also ==
- Foreign relations of Austria
- Foreign relations of Russia
