= Lists of ambassadors of Europe =

List of ambassadors of Europe may refer to:

== General ==
- Lists of ambassadors of Russia
- Lists of ambassadors of Sweden
- Lists of ambassadors of the United Kingdom

== Albania ==
- List of ambassadors of Albania to Algeria
- List of ambassadors of Albania to Argentina
- List of ambassadors of Albania to Austria
- List of ambassadors of Albania to Bulgaria
- List of ambassadors of Albania to China
- List of ambassadors of Albania to Cuba
- List of ambassadors of Albania to the Czech Republic
- List of ambassadors of Albania to Egypt
- List of ambassadors of Albania to France
- List of ambassadors of Albania to Germany
- List of ambassadors of Albania to Greece
- List of ambassadors of Albania to Hungary
- List of ambassadors of Albania to Italy
- List of ambassadors of Albania to Poland
- List of ambassadors of Albania to Romania
- List of ambassadors of Albania to Russia
- List of ambassadors of Albania to Serbia
- List of ambassadors of Albania to Sweden
- List of ambassadors of Albania to Turkey
- List of ambassadors of Albania to the United Kingdom
- List of ambassadors of Albania to the United States
- List of ambassadors of Albania to Vietnam

== Austria ==
- List of ambassadors of Austria to Argentina
- List of ambassadors of Austria to Cuba (embassy accredited for Antigua and Barbuda, Dominica, Grenada, St. Kitts and Nevis, St. Lucia, St. Vincent and the Grenadines, Venezuela, the Dominican Republic and Haiti)
- List of ambassadors of Austria to Denmark
- List of ambassadors of Austria to France
  - List of ambassadors of Austria-Hungary to France
- List of ambassadors of Austria to Japan
- List of ambassadors of Austria to Mexico
- List of ambassadors of Austria to the Netherlands
- List of ambassadors of Austria to the Organisation for Economic Co-operation and Development
- List of ambassadors of Austria to Peru
- List of ambassadors of Austria to the Philippines
- List of ambassadors of Austria to Russia
- List of ambassadors of Austria to South Africa (embassy accredited for Angola, Botswana, Lesotho, Madagascar, Mauritius, Mozambique, Namibia, Zimbabwe, and Eswatini)
- List of ambassadors of Austria to South Korea
- List of ambassadors of Austria to Spain
- List of ambassadors of Austria to Switzerland
- List of ambassadors of Austria to the United States
- List of ambassadors of Austria to the United Kingdom
  - List of ambassadors of Austria-Hungary to the United Kingdom

== France ==
- List of ambassadors of France to Algeria
- List of ambassadors of France to Australia
- List of ambassadors of France to Austria
- List of ambassadors of France to Belgium
- List of ambassadors of France to Canada
- List of ambassadors of France to England
- List of ambassadors of France to Germany
- List of ambassadors of France to Greece
- List of ambassadors of France to Guatemala
- List of ambassadors of France to Italy
- List of ambassadors of France to Israel
- List of ambassadors of France to Japan
- List of ambassadors of France to Lebanon
- List of ambassadors of France to Poland
- List of ambassadors of France to Russia
- List of ambassadors of France to South Korea
- List of ambassadors of France to Sweden
- List of ambassadors of France to the Kingdom of Great Britain
- List of ambassadors of France to the United Kingdom
- List of ambassadors of France to the United States

== Germany ==
- List of ambassadors of Germany to Afghanistan
- List of ambassadors of Germany to Argentina
- List of ambassadors of Germany to Australia
- List of ambassadors of Germany to Austria
- List of ambassadors of Germany to Belgium
- List of ambassadors of Germany to Brazil
- List of ambassadors of Germany to Chile
- List of ambassadors of Germany to China
- List of ambassadors of Germany to the Czech Republic
- List of ambassadors of Germany to Denmark
- List of ambassadors of Germany to Egypt
- List of ambassadors of Germany to France
- List of ambassadors of Germany to Greece
- List of ambassadors of Germany to India
- List of ambassadors of Germany to Ireland
- List of ambassadors of Germany to Italy
- List of ambassadors of Germany to Japan
- List of ambassadors of Germany to Morocco
- List of ambassadors of Germany to the Netherlands
- List of ambassadors of Germany to New Zealand
- List of ambassadors of Germany to Paraguay
- List of ambassadors of Germany to Peru
- List of ambassadors of Germany to the Philippines
- List of ambassadors of Germany to Poland
- List of ambassadors of Germany to Romania
- List of ambassadors of Germany to Russia
- List of ambassadors of Germany to Serbia
- List of ambassadors of Germany to South Africa
- List of ambassadors of Germany to South Korea
- List of ambassadors of Germany to Spain
- List of ambassadors of Germany to Sweden
- List of ambassadors of Germany to Switzerland
- List of ambassadors of Germany to Trinidad and Tobago
- List of ambassadors of Germany to Turkey
- List of ambassadors of Germany to the United Kingdom
- List of ambassadors of Germany to the United States
- List of ambassadors of Nazi Germany

== Iceland ==
- List of ambassadors of Iceland to Austria
- List of ambassadors of Iceland to Belgium
- List of ambassadors of Iceland to Canada
- List of ambassadors of Iceland to China
- List of ambassadors of Iceland to Czechoslovakia
- List of ambassadors of Iceland to Denmark
- List of ambassadors of Iceland to East Germany
- List of ambassadors of Iceland to Finland
- List of ambassadors of Iceland to France
- List of ambassadors of Iceland to Germany
- List of ambassadors of Iceland to India
- List of ambassadors of Iceland to Japan
- List of ambassadors of Iceland to Norway
- List of ambassadors of Iceland to Russia
- List of ambassadors of Iceland to Sweden
- List of ambassadors of Iceland to the Soviet Union
- List of ambassadors of Iceland to the United Kingdom
- List of ambassadors of Iceland to the United States
- List of ambassadors of Iceland to Yugoslavia
