= List of ambassadors of Albania =

List of ambassadors of Albania may refer to:

- List of ambassadors of Albania to Algeria
- List of ambassadors of Albania to Argentina
- List of ambassadors of Albania to Austria
- List of ambassadors of Albania to Bulgaria
- List of ambassadors of Albania to China
- List of ambassadors of Albania to Cuba
- List of ambassadors of Albania to the Czech Republic
- List of ambassadors of Albania to Egypt
- List of ambassadors of Albania to France
- List of ambassadors of Albania to Germany
- List of ambassadors of Albania to Greece
- List of ambassadors of Albania to Hungary
- List of ambassadors of Albania to Italy
- List of ambassadors of Albania to Poland
- List of ambassadors of Albania to Romania
- List of ambassadors of Albania to Russia
- List of ambassadors of Albania to Serbia
- List of ambassadors of Albania to Sweden
- List of ambassadors of Albania to Turkey
- List of ambassadors of Albania to the United Kingdom
- List of ambassadors of Albania to the United States
- List of ambassadors of Albania to Vietnam
