= Albanian Italian =

Albanian Italian or Italian Albanian may refer to:

- As an adjective, anything pertaining to Albania–Italy relations
- Albanians in Italy
- Arbëreshë people, an Albanian ethnolinguistic group minority historically settled in Southern and Insular Italy
- Italian colonists in Albania
