= Shpresa =

Shpresa is an Albanian female name meaning "hope" (shpresë). People bearing the name Shpresa include:

- Shpresa Gjongecaj (born 1952), Albanian archaeologist and numismatist
- Shpresa Kureta (born 1959), Albanian ambassador to Poland
- Shpresa Lleshaj, member of Swedish pop duo Flora Cash
