= Albanians in Hungary =

Albanians in Hungary Shqiptarët në Hungari Magyarországi albánok
Regions with significant populations
- Budapest · Debrecen

Languages
- Hungarian, Albanian

Religion
- Islam, Christianity, Atheism

Albanians in Hungary (Albanian: Shqiptarët në Hungari; Hungarian: magyarországi albánok) are ethnic Albanians living in Hungary.

== History ==
One of the earliest recorded Albanians in Hungary was Antonius in the 14th century, the bishop of Shkodër, who had previously served as a vicar in Bács in the Kingdom of Hungary. He later became bishop of Shkodër in 1367.

After the Great Turkish War, where they had sided with the Austrians, a group of Albanians from Kosovo, Catholic and Muslim, moved to Hungary. They numbered around 10,000 people. Toma Raspasani, a Catholic clergyman, reported in his writings in 1693 that many Catholics had settled Budapest, and most died of hunger or disease.

== Notable people ==
- Gjon Delhusa – singer, composer and lyricist
- Ignác Martinovics – philosopher, writer and a leader of the Hungarian Jacobin movement
- Andrei Mocioni – jurist, politician, and informal leader of the ethnic Romanian community; part-Albanian

== See also ==
- Albanian–Hungarian relations
- Albanian diaspora
- Immigration to Hungary
