= List of ambassadors of Albania to Greece =

Albania-Greece relations over the last hundred years, which coincide with the modern history of the Albanian state, have been dominated by two fundamental issues: territorial/border disputes and the issue of minorities, phenomena typical of two nations and neighboring states.

== List of diplomatic representatives of Albania to Greece (1920–present) ==
=== Ambassadors ===
No.	Name	Title	Term served
1	Midhat Frashëri	Ambassador	1923	1926
2	Lec Kurti	Ambassador	1926	1926
3	Stavro Stavri	Ambassador	1926	1928
4	Rrok Stani	Ambassador	1929	1929
5	Eqrem Vlora	Ambassador	1929	1930
6	Ali Asllani	Ambassador	1930	1932
7	Xhaferr Vila	Ambassador	1932	1933
8	Tahir Shtylla	Ambassador	1933	1933
9	Qemal Mesarea	Ambassador	1933	1934
10	Xhavid Leskoviku	Ambassador	1934	1936
11	Sotir Laci	Ambassador	1936	1937
12	Rauf Fico	Ambassador	1937	1939
Suspended diplomatic ties (1939–1972)
13	Lik Seiti	Ambassador	1972	1979
14	Bashkim Dino	Ambassador	1979	1981
15	Ksenofon Nushi	Ambassador	1981	1988
16	Izedin Ajdini	Ambassador	1988	1991
17	Qazim Tepshi	Ambassador	1991	1992
18	Hysen Çabej	Ambassador	1992	1997
19	Kastriot Robo	Ambassador	1997	2002
20	Bashkim Zeneli	Ambassador	2002	2005
21	Vili Minarolli	Ambassador	2005	2010
22	Dashnor Dervishi	Ambassador	2010	2016
23	Ardiana Hobdari	Ambassador	2017	2019
24	Luela Hajdaraga	Ambassador	2021	Present

=== Consuls ===
No.	Name	Title	Term served
1	Qemal Frashëri	Consul	1925	1926
2	Vasil Kalluci	Consul	1926	1926
3	Avdyl Sula	Consul	1926	1927
4	Remzi Janina	Consul	1926	1931
5	Sofokli Çomorra	Consul	1928	1933
6	Ferid Dervishi	Consul	1932	1933
7	Dhimitër Kosturi	Consul	1932	1935
8	Hamdi Karazi	Consul	1933	1934
9	Remzi Çelo	Consul	1934	1939
10	Qemal Jusfuti	Consul	1934	1935
11	Gjergj Geco	Consul	1935	1936
12	Sotir Laci	Consul	1936	1937
13	Nezir Leskoviku	Consul	1936	1938
14	Maksud Hulusi	Consul	1937	1939
15	Rrok Stani	Consul	1937	1939
16	Xhahid Koka	Consul	1938	1938
17	Angjelin Kakariqi	Consul	1938	1939
