= Albania–Hungary relations =

- Albania: Hungary

Albania has an embassy in Budapest and Hungary has an embassy and a consular office in Tirana. The history of diplomatic relations of Albania and Hungary dates back to 1912, when Albania declared its independence on November 28, 1912.

The countries are members of the North Atlantic Treaty Organization (NATO), Council of Europe and the Organization for Security and Co-operation in Europe (OSCE). As a EU member, Hungary supports the Accession of Albania to the EU.

== History ==
Both countries experienced Ottoman rule and in some cases rebelled against it, historically including the alliance between John Hunyadi and Gjergj Kastrioti Skanderbeg. In the Great Turkish War, Albanian Catholic leaders Pjetër Bogdani and Toma Raspasani rallied Kosovo Albanian Catholics and Muslims to the pro-Austrian cause. After the Great Turkish War, Hungary was absorbed into the Habsburg domain, while Albanian inhabited regions remained part of the Ottoman Empire and experienced a period of economic and societal breakdown, which saw large numbers of Catholics from Kosovo flee to north to arrive in Budapest, and the widespread Islamization due to extremely steep increases in the poll tax by Ottoman authorities as well as instances of forced conversion. Albanian Catholicism survived in the mountainous Northwest of Albania with significant aid from Austro-Hungarian clerics. Austro-Hungarian funded Catholic schools were the only schools where Albanians were able to study in their native language during Ottoman rule, and as a result many of their students would contribute to the emergence of Albanian nationalism, as did some Hungarian intellectuals such as Franz Nopcsa.

=== Albanian Independence ===
Austria-Hungary was a key proponent of Albanian independence and opposed attempts by Slavic nations to dominate Albanian lands. Austro-Hungarian diplomatic assistance was critical for the expulsion of the Serbian and Montenegrin armies from Durrës and Shkodër in 1912, during the First Balkan War. After Albanian independence, King Zog married a Hungarian woman, Géraldine Apponyi de Nagyappony. In the early 20th century, Albania and Hungary shared a situation where large numbers of Albanians and Hungarians resided outside of their respective new borders, and both saw the rise of irredentist movements that aimed to create Greater Hungary and Greater Albania, but were obstructed by the relative strength of surrounding countries.

During World War II, both countries came under the control of Axis-allied regimes, followed by the domination of Communist parties allied to Moscow. Albanian-Hungarian relations came to a halt after the Soviet-Albanian split, but were resuscitated after the fall of Communism.

=== Relations during Cold War ===
After World War II, both countries intensified relations by being part of the Eastern Bloc and they were founding members of the Warsaw Pact, which was a collective defence treaty established by the Soviet Union and its satellite states, including both Albania and Czechoslovakia. In 1961, bilateral relations were degraded at the level of Charge d'Affaires.

The multi-national Communist armed forces' sole joint action was the Warsaw Pact invasion of Czechoslovakia in August 1968. All member countries, with the exception of the People's Republic of Albania and the Socialist Republic of Romania participated in the invasion. Albania formally withdrew form the Warsaw Pact in 1968 over the matter.

== Resident diplomatic missions ==
- Albania has an embassy in Budapest.
- Hungary has an embassy in Tirana.

== See also ==
- Foreign relations of Albania
- Foreign relations of Hungary
- Accession of Albania to the EU
- NATO-EU relations
- List of ambassadors of Albania to Hungary
- Albanians in Hungary
