= Embassy of Italy, Tirana =

- Ambasada italiane në Tiranë

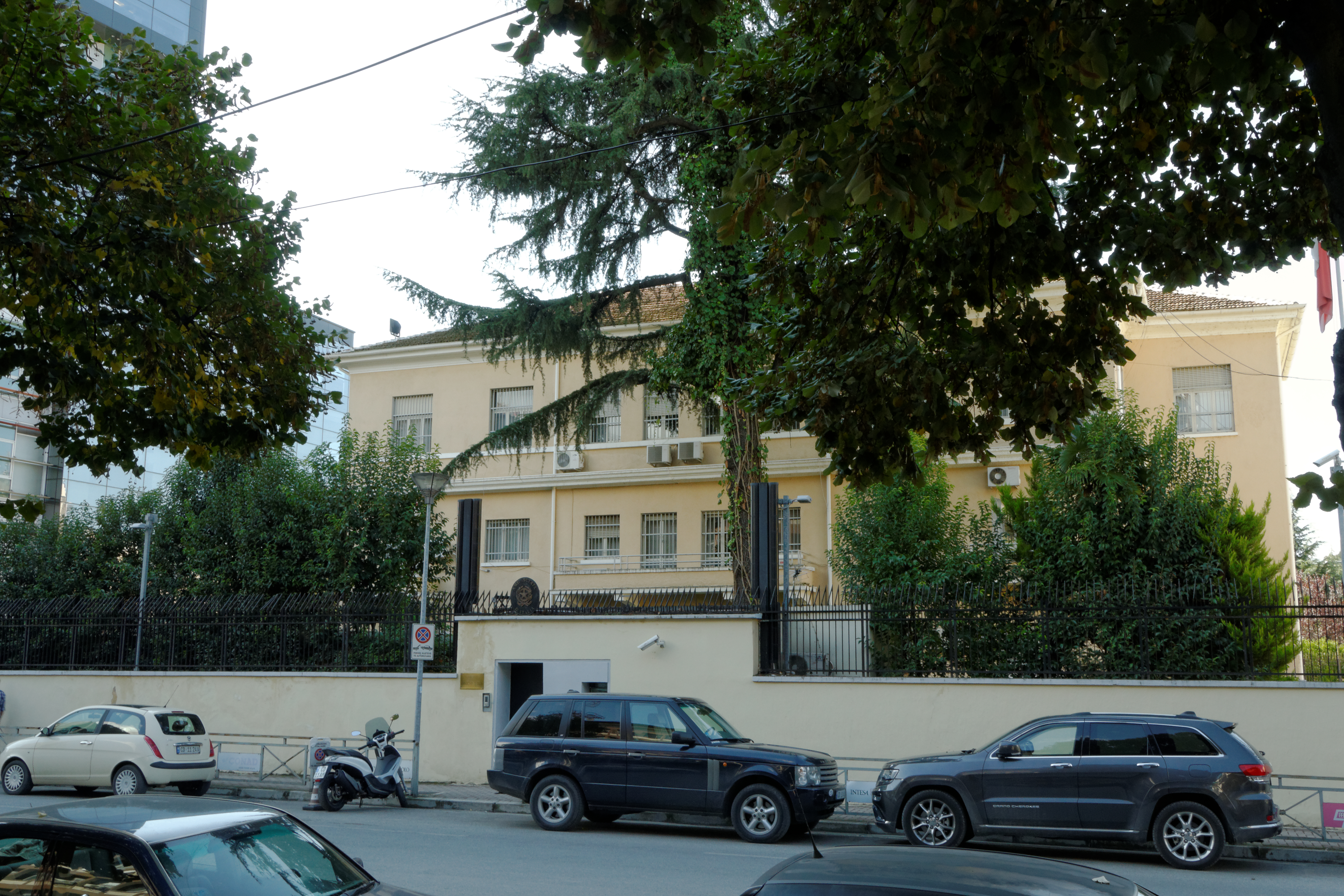
- Interactive map of the Embassy of Italy, Tirana area

General information
- Location: Rruga Papa Gjon Pali II, N.2, 1010 Tirana, Albania
- Coordinates: 41°19′18″N 19°49′33″E

Website
- ambtirana.esteri.it

The Embassy of Italy in Tirana is the embassy of Italy in Albania, in the capital city of Tirana. The embassy is charged with diplomacy and Albania–Italy relations. The Italian Ambassador to Albania is the head of the diplomatic mission of Italy to Albania. The embassy building has been recognized by the National Institute of Cultural Heritage of Albania as a Cultural Monument of Albania, specified 122, reference number TR006.
