= Luan Rama =

Albanian diplomat, writer and researcher

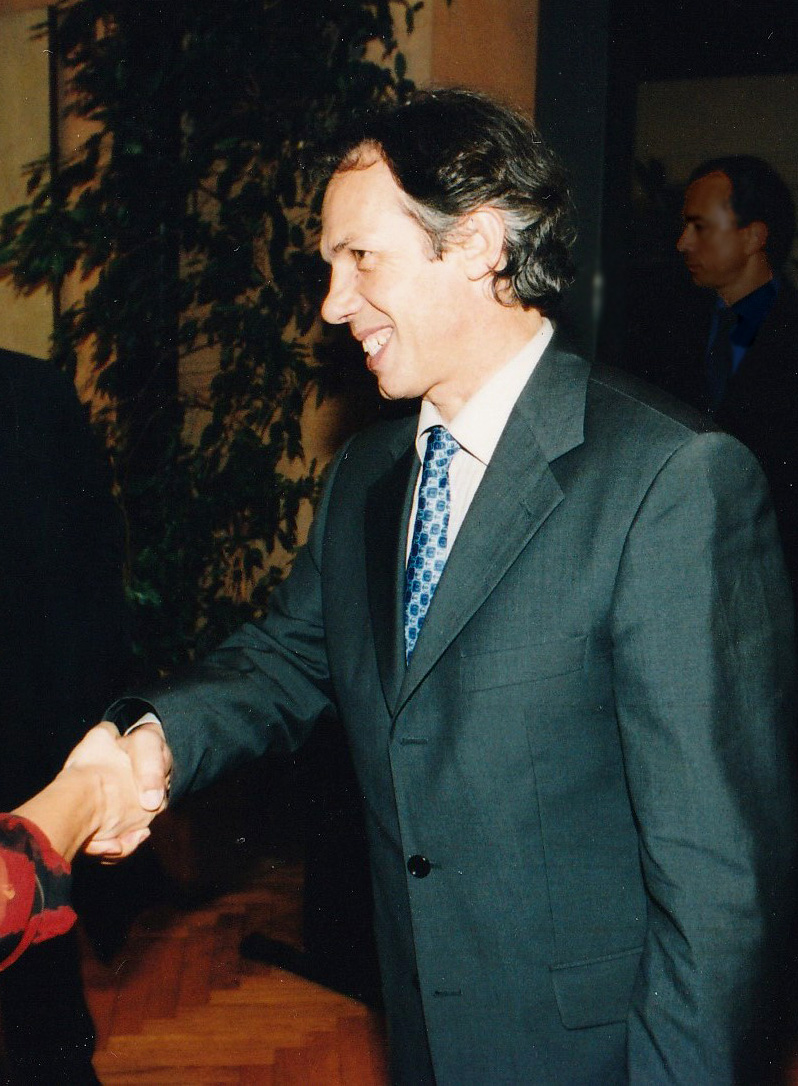
- Luan Rama in 1999

Ambassador of Albania to France
- In office 11 December 1997 – June 2001

Personal details
- Born: 5 January 1952 (age 74) Tirana, Albania
- Children: 2
- Education: University of Tirana

Luan Rama (born 5 January 1952) is an Albanian writer, poet, diplomat, journalist, screenwriter and researcher based in Paris, France. He is known for his literary works focusing on Albanian–French cultural relations, Balkan history as well as for his contributions to Albanian cinematography and diplomacy. Rama served as ambassador of Albania to France, Portugal and Monaco and also represented the country at UNESCO and the Organisation internationale de la Francophonie (OIF).

== Early life and education ==
Luan Rama was born in Tirana, People's Republic of Albania, on 5 January 1952. He studied journalism at the Faculty of Political and Juridical Sciences at the University of Tirana and later pursued studies in communication, cinematography and audiovisual media at Paris Diderot University, in France.

== Career ==
=== Cinematography ===
Rama worked for more than a decade in Albanian cinema as a screenwriter and author of documentary and animated film scripts. His film works include Vajzat me kordele të kuqe (1984), Dëshmorët e monumenteve (1985), Një jetë më shumë (1987) and Pranverë e hidhur (1988).

His animated screenplay Dy gosti received First Prize at the Giffoni International Film Festival, in Italy. He wrote screenplays for over forty documentaries and sixteen animations. Among his notable documentary works, Mos harroni, a film about Albanian resistance fighters in Nazi concentration camps, won First Prize at the Albanian Documentary Film Festival, in 1984.

=== Journalism and publishing ===
Rama has translated numerous literary works between Albanian and French and has edited and published books by French travelers and artists connected with Albania.

=== Diplomatic career ===
Rama entered the diplomatic service in the late 1980s. Between 1992 and 1993 he served as chargé d'affaires at the Albanian embassy in Paris and later represented Albania at UNESCO.

From 1997 to 2001 he was Ambassador of Albania to France and Portugal and from 1998 to 2001 also served as ambassador to Monaco. During this time he acted as Albania’s representative to the Organisation internationale de la Francophonie.

Between 2000 and 2004 Rama was a member of the High Council of the OIF and would later participate in several election observation missions throughout the Francophone world.

=== Academic work ===
Among his works are studies on Charles de Gaulle, François Mitterrand, Jean Moréas, Arthur Rimbaud, Jean Cocteau and French archaeologist Léon Rey. His books also examine Franco-Albanian cultural relations and the experiences of Albanian emigrants in France.

== Selected publications ==
=== Works published in Albania ===
- "Fransua Miteran – romantizmi i pushtetit" (1996)
- "Metamorfoza e fjalës" (1997)
- "Shkëlqimet e meteorëve" (1998)
- "Nën hijen e eklipsit" (2000)
- "Shqipëria frankofone" (2001)
- "Krushq të largët" (2002)
- "Gjenerali De Gol, një legjendë e gjallë" (2004)
- "Omer – Shtërgu nga Ballkani" (2005)
- "Shtëpia e Shpresës" (2005)
- "Santa Quaranta" (2005)
- "Dino – Shtegtari i Portës Sublime" (2007)
- "Camera Obscura" (2007)
- "Në udhëkryqet e kohës" (4 volumes, 2007–2019)
- "Kur bie shi ti thua: është kohë e bukur" (2008)
- "Kalorësit e stuhisë" (2010)
- "Durazzo, dozhet, purpuri" (2007)
- "Pikëtakim Jean Cocteau" (2009)
- "Jean Moreas, poeti nga Morea" (2009)
- "Dorëshkrimet e Purpurta" (2009)
- "Parisi letrar" (2009)
- "Léon Rey… dhe gurët filluan të flasin" (2010)
- "Udhëtimi i mbramë Arthur Rimbaud" (2010)
- "Bujtës të largët" (2012)
- "Pranvera dy hapa afër" (2012)
- "Tek Frankët" (2012)
- "Shqipëria në luftën Byzantine-Norman" (2013)
- "Hello from Albania" (2014)
- "Shqipëria e konsullit Auguste Dozon" (2014)
- "Shqiptarët e Léon Gérôme" (2016)
- "Territoret e shpirtit" (2016)
- "Përballë tablosë" (2016)
- "Vjeshta and Alberto Savianit" (2016)
- "Legjenda shqiptare" (2016)
- "Vera, ky nektar i hyjnive dhe i njeriut" (2017)
- "Udhëtim në botën e pikturës shqiptare" (2017)
- "Shqipëria dhe shqiptarët në piktorët francezë të shekullit XIX" (2017)
- "Epistolari i Zaratës" (2017)
- "Ofshama e gargujve" (2017)
- "Dozon dhe Albania – konsulli që dashuroi përrallat" (2018)
- "Poezi dashurie në kohë të vonë" (2018)
- "Mbresa parisiane" (2018)
- "In Greece, with the Arvanites" (2018)
- "Burri që donte të vdiste" (2018)
- "Porto Palermo" (2019)
- "Dalia" (2021)
- "Një mungesë e gjatë" (2021)
- "Kthimi i flamandëve" (2022)
- "Toka, një portokall blu" (2023)
- "Gruaja që vinte nga mjegulla" (2023)
- "Murgu i malit të shenjtë" (2025)

=== Works published abroad ===
- "Le long chemin sous le tunnel de Platon" (2001)
- "Couvrez-moi avec un morceau de ciel" (2002)
- "Pont entre deux rives" (2005)
- "Valdet – sous le poids de la croix" (2011)
- "Léon Rey à la découverte d’Apollonia" (2012)
- "Territoires de l’âme" (2017)
- "Τα όρια της ψυχής" (2018)
- "The Epistolary of Zarata" (2019)
- "Zaratha’s Epistolary" (Australia, 2019)
- "La Concubine des montagnes" (2022)
- "Une si longue absence" (2022)

== Honours and awards ==
- Grand Officier de l’Ordre National du Mérite, awarded by the President of France (2002)
- Naim Frashëri Medal, awarded by the Republic of Albania
- Prix Europe (ADELF), for "Le long chemin sous le tunnel de Platon" (2000)
- Personality of the Year of La Francophonie, awarded by the Albanian Ministry of Foreign Affairs (2014)
- Best Children’s Book Award, at the Tirana Book Fair for "Më quajnë Aleksandër Moisiu" (2016)
- "Alexander the Great" Golden Award, by the Greek UNESCO Commission (2017)
- Man of the Year, from the HARPA Foundation (2017)
- Golden Crown of Poetry, by the "Poetic Nights of Korçë" festival (2018)

== See also ==
- List of ambassadors of Albania to France
