= Albania–Russia relations =

- Albania: Russia

Diplomatic mission
- Embassy of Albania, Moscow: Embassy of Russia, Tirana

The establishment of diplomatic relations between Albania and Russia happened on April 7, 1924. Both countries were also allies in the Warsaw Pact. Albania has an embassy in Moscow. Russia has an embassy in Tirana.

Both countries are full members of the Organization of the Black Sea Economic Cooperation, Organization for Security and Co-operation in Europe and the Organisation of Islamic Cooperation (Albania is a member, while Russia is an observer state).

== Albania and Imperial Russia ==
During the Balkan Wars (1912–1913), Albanians declared the independence of Albania from the Ottoman Empire. Austria-Hungary and Italy supported Albanian independence and one of their reasons for recognition was to halt the growth of Russian influence in the region. Russia and France opposed Albanian aims due to their support for Serbia, and both backed their Balkan allies proposals for less territory and coast for the new borders of the Albanian state.

== Albania and the USSR ==
Initially after Albania's liberation from Nazi occupation, Yugoslav advisors were extensively involved in Albanian affairs. Joseph Stalin supported Yugoslav influence in Albania, but became concerned with Josip Broz Tito's ambition in the region. Enver Hoxha flew in July 1947 to Moscow to conclude a trade agreement with the Soviet Union and engage in further negotiations with Stalin. Hoxha expressed strong support for Stalin during the 1948 Tito-Stalin split.

In 1949, Albania joined the Council for Mutual Economic Assistance (Comecon). Tirana soon entered into trade agreements with Poland, Czechoslovakia, Hungary, Romania, and the Soviet Union.

Soviet support was important to Albania, which was predominantly rural and poor. By the middle of the 1950s, Albania had received major loans from the USSR as well as other socialist countries. Industrialization in Albania benefitted from Soviet technical assistance. From the Soviet perspective, Albania's Soviet-assisted modernization would be a powerful example for the Third World. The Soviet Union also sent Albania military advisers and built a submarine installation on Sazan Island.

Albania's first university was modeled on the Soviet example.

After the Soviet-Yugoslav split, Albania and Bulgaria were the only countries the Soviet Union could use to funnel matériel to the communists fighting in Greece. What little strategic value Albania offered the Soviet Union, however, gradually shrank as nuclear arms technology developed.

=== Rift in the Communist Bloc ===
Soviet Premier Nikita Khrushchev's 1956 criticism of Stalin and efforts to restore the USSR's relations with Yugoslavia created concern among Albanian leadership. Albania refused de-Stalinization.

Issues of Albania's development also caused strain with the USSR. Soviet functionaries contended that their Albanian peers made planning errors and relied too heavily on Soviet aid. Khrushchev's concept for Albanian development as an Eastern bloc agricultural supplier differed from Hoxha's plans, which envisioned Albania expanding its heavy industry and developing oil refineries.

In May 1959, Khrushchev paid a visit to Tirana in the first visit by a Russian leader to the country. The 13-day visit was the first time since the war that a major world leader came on an official visit to Albania. The goal of the visit was to pressure Albania into building Yugoslav–Albanian and Soviet–Albanian relations as well as, according to historian Miranda Vickers, "focus their economy on the growing of citrus fruits rather than concentrate on industrialization". Khrushchev also visited the ancient southern city of Butrint, where he remarked to Soviet Defense Minister Rodion Malinovsky "Look how marvelous this is! An ideal base for our submarines could be built here. These old things [reference to archaeological findings] should be dug up and thrown into the sea". The visit was clouded by mutual mistrust, which resulted in Khrushchev's departure from Albania two days ahead of schedule.

By 1960, relations between the USSR and China had substantially declined. During the Sino-Soviet Split, Albania supported the People's Republic of China. This isolated them from the Soviet leadership, and started the Soviet-Albanian split. In 1960, Albania declined to criticize China despite Soviet pressure, which resulted in praise from China and Hoxha becoming increasingly critical of the Soviet Union. At a July 1960 plenum, Hoxha spoke against what he deemed as ideological mistakes by the Soviets.

Later in 1960, Hoxha described the Soviet ambassador to Albania as a saboteur and criticized Soviet leadership at a meeting of the communist parties in the Soviet Union.

Hoxha made working visits to Moscow in 1960 and 1961.

Khrushchev criticized Albania during Communist Party of the Soviet Union's Twenty-Second Party Congress in October 1961. Maintaining that Albania would not be subject to the Soviet Union, in November 1961, Hoxha famously stated that Albanians "would eat grass – if necessary – rather than sell themselves for thirty silverlings." Khrushchev lambasted the Albanians for executing a pregnant, pro-Soviet member of the Albanian Labor Party's Politburo, and the Soviet Union finally broke diplomatic relations with Albania in December. Moscow then withdrew all Soviet economic advisers and technicians from the country, including those at work on the Palace of Culture, and halted shipments of supplies and spare parts for equipment already in place in Albania. In addition, the Soviet Union continued to dismantle its naval installations on Sazan Island, a process that had begun even before the break in relations.

The split resulted in the loss of the Soviet Union's largest naval base Pashaliman in southern Albania and the Mediterranean Sea.

=== Impact of Albania's relations with China ===
China compensated Albania for the loss of Soviet economic support, by supplying about 90% of the parts, foodstuffs, and other goods the Soviet Union had promised. Beijing lent the Albanians money on more favorable terms than Moscow, and, unlike Soviet advisers, Chinese technicians earned the same low pay as Albanian workers and lived in similar housing. China also presented Albania with a powerful radio transmission station. For its part, Albania offered China a beachhead in Europe and acted as a partner at the UN. Chinese equipment and technicians were not as sophisticated as the Soviet goods and advisers they replaced. Because of language barriers, Chinese and Albanian technicians communicated in Russian. Albanians no longer took part in Warsaw Pact activities or Comecon agreements. The other East European communist nations, however, did not break diplomatic or trade links with Albania. In 1964 the Albanian seized empty Soviet embassy in Tirana, and Albanian workers pressed on with construction of the Palace of Culture on their own.

=== Later developments ===
In October 1964, Hoxha hailed Khrushchev's fall from power, and the Soviet Union's new leaders made overtures to Tirana. It soon became clear, however, that the new Soviet leadership had no intention of changing basic policies to suit Albania, and relations failed to improve. Tirana's propaganda continued for decades to refer to Soviet officials as "treacherous revisionists" and "traitors to communism," and in 1964 Hoxha said that Albania's terms for reconciliation were a Soviet apology to Albania and reparations for damages inflicted on the country. Soviet-Albanian relations dipped to new lows after the Warsaw Pact invasion of Czechoslovakia in 1968, when Albania responded by officially withdrawing from the alliance.

Sino-Albanian relations ended by 1978. Even with the Sino-Albanian split, the Albanians refused to normalize relations with the Soviet Union, leaving their country virtually completely isolated from the outside world.

== Albania and the Russian Federation ==
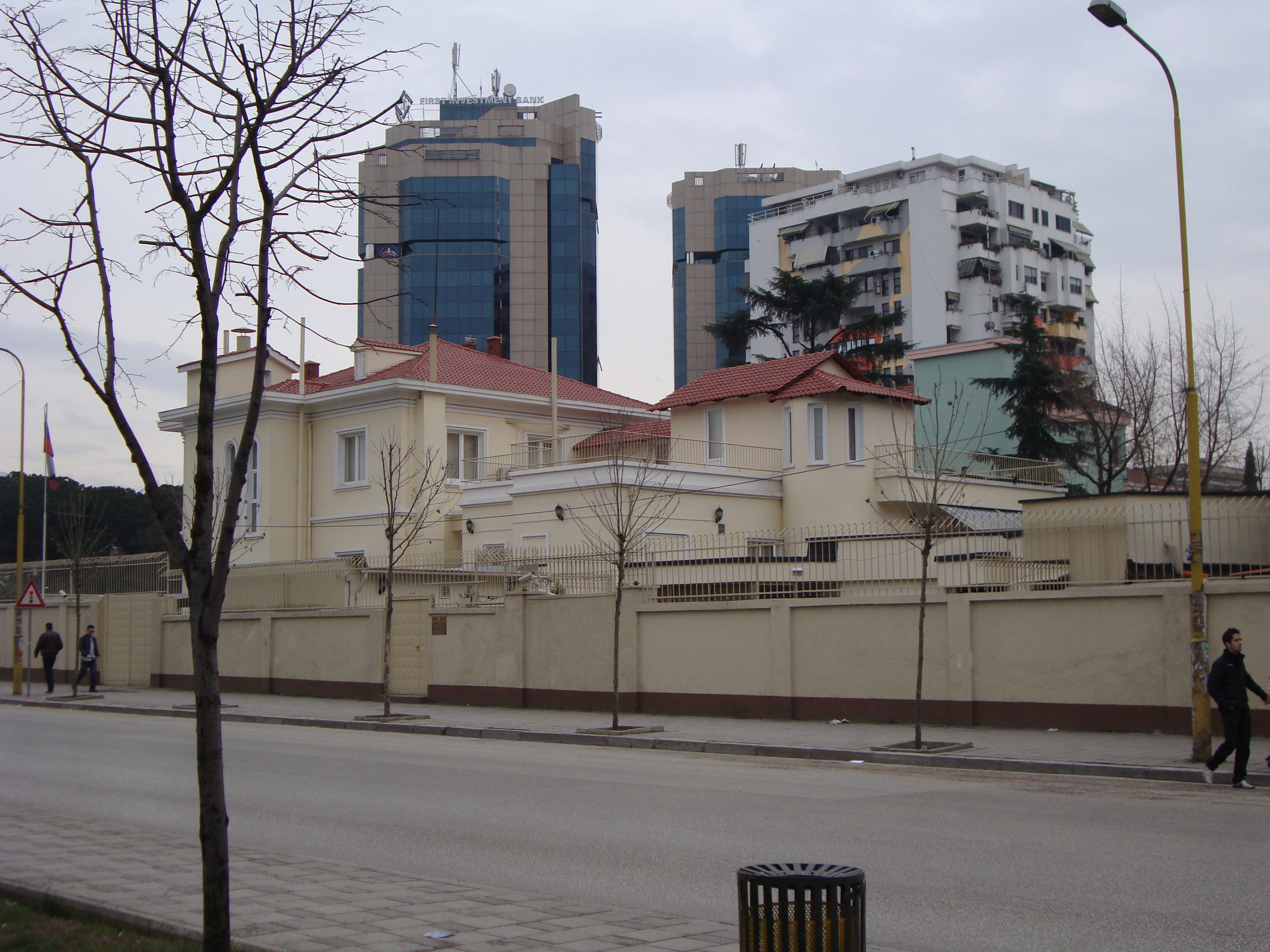
Russian Embassy in Tirana

Albania and the Soviet Union reestablished relations in 1990, when then foreign minister of the Soviet Union, Eduard Shevardnadze, asked Albania for forgiveness for his country's part of the guilt for breaking relations with Albania three decades earlier. In April 1995, Albanian prime minister Aleksandër Meksi officially visited Moscow and signed a series of economic and political agreements. In the 1990s, the staff at Russia's Albanian embassy was enlarged three times its previous size, due to the growth of Russian intelligence operatives active in Albania. Albania's close relations with the US and NATO has served as other factors for Russian espionage by its agencies located in Tirana.

During the 1990s, relations between post communist Russia and Albania remained strained due to conflicts in the Balkans. Russia backed FR Yugoslavia and no efforts were made to advance better relations with Albania. Paskal Milo, Albania's Foreign Minister visited Russia in 2000 and was subjected to attacks in the Russian media and in commentaries by Russian parliamentarians which Albania considered as "open threats" to its interests. The Kosovo conflict increased tensions as Russian Foreign Minister Yevgeny Primakov sent a letter to the Albanian premier stating that the Albanian government needed to eradicate "Albanian terrorism" within Kosovo. The Albanian government replied with a stern written letter to Russian allegations.

Russian authorities view Albanians of the Balkans as being responsible for a majority of crime committed in the region. For example, in 2002 when Russian Foreign Minister Igor Ivanov, days before a visit to Albania, said that where Albanians are the dominant population, human trafficking and crime was prevalent. In Albania, Ivanov in a meeting with Albanian authorities stated that the global network of Islamic terrorism ran from Afghanistan, through to Chechnya and ended with Albanian populations in Macedonia and Kosovo. Albania viewed Russia's policy for Kosovo and Macedonia as attempts to form a Slavic-Orthodox axis. As part of Russia's international disinformation efforts, it criticized Albania's stance on the Kosovo question and pressured Tirana to not seek close relations with Pristina. Russia has alleged that Albania interferes in the internal affairs of Macedonia and Serbia, whereas Tirana is suspicious of Moscow's strong backing of Belgrade's policies.

In the 2000s, Albania was not reliant on Russian based markets, energy or trade. Russia viewed Albania eventually becoming part of its European energy network. In 2000, both states made an announcement to begin discussions over a gas and oil pipeline for Albania and to grow investment and trade. Russia also stated a preference to send electricity from its Unified Energy System to Albania. In 2002, Albanian Foreign Minister Ilir Meta went to Moscow and both states agreed to create economic committees and sign agreements for agriculture and tackling crime. The Chamber of Commerce of both countries signed a cooperation agreement.

In Albania, Russia's standing is low among the Albanian population and as such it lacks opportunities to be active in shaping or influencing the outlook of local Albanians. During the 2000s, Russia did not have any links with local Albanian political parties and was not able to undermine pro-Western governments through extreme political groups. Due to crime and corruption in the Balkans, Russia has promoted an anti-Albanian stance where Albania is described as a hub of crime and diplomatic incidents have occurred. For example, in 2002, the Albanian Foreign Ministry pushed back against statements from OSCE foreign monitors, some from Russia and calling themselves "Friends of Albania" who criticised Tirana for corruption and crime.

Since the 2008 Kosovo declaration of independence, Russia has mainly backed Serbia. However the relations between the two countries begin to improve through the organizations they are a part of. Albania's ambassador to Russia as of November 2018 was Arben Gazioni, and Russia's ambassador to Albania was Alexander Karpushin. Within the wider Balkans Albania is considered to be the most pro-EU and pro-Western country in the region and unlike its neighbours (except Kosovo), it has little to negligible support for Russia.

The Albanian government made two Russian diplomats leave Albania in 2018 on grounds that their actions were not in line with the diplomatic status allowed them in the country. In January 2021, Albania expelled two Russian diplomats after repeated contraventions of Albanian government COVID-19 lockdown measures. Russia said Albania's move was politically motivated and responded in early February by expelling Albania's top diplomat in Moscow.

In October 2021, Russia's Foreign Ministry spokeswoman, Maria Zakharova criticized the Albanian Prime Minister Edi Rama for saying he aims at unifying Albania and Kosovo to form “Greater Albania”. Zakharova said the statement goes against long standing treaty and that could heighten tensions in the Balkan Region.

=== Russo-Ukrainian war ===
Albania opposed the 2014 annexation of Crimea by Russia and its moves to destabilise eastern areas of Ukraine. Albanian authorities were concerned with Russia's increasing deployment of its power and stated that the West needed to respond in a firm and unitary manner toward Russian actions in Ukraine.

In mid-February 2022, Russian foreign minister Sergei Lavrov accused Albania and two other Balkan countries of sending mercenaries to fight for Ukraine in the war in Donbas. The claims were rejected by Albanian officials.

As Russian military actions in Ukraine commenced, Albanian President Ilir Meta, Prime Minister Edi Rama, Minister for Europe and Foreign Affairs Olta Xhaçka, and Ambassador to the UN Ferit Hoxha made statements condemning the Russian invasion of Ukraine. Russia's recognition of the separatist regions in the Ukrainian Donbas as independent was condemned by Albania as a violation of the Minsk Protocol, international law and of Ukraine's statehood and borders.

In late February 2022, Albania and the US tabled a co-written resolution condemning the Russian invasion of Ukraine at the 15 member UN Security Council, but failed to pass as Russia vetoed it. At the UN Security Council, Albania cosponsored a resolution with the US for an emergency General Assembly session to be held regarding the invasion of Ukraine. As it was a procedural vote, Russia's opposition did not effect the outcome and the resolution passed. At the emergency General Assembly session, Albania voted in favour of a resolution which successfully passed that condemned Russia's invasion and demanded its military withdrawal from Ukraine.

Albania imposed sanctions on Russia targeting the political and business elite close to President Vladimir Putin, on sectors related to energy, finance, technology and transport, and denying airspace access to Russian aircraft. The name of a Tirana street where the Russian embassy is located was changed to "Free Ukraine" by Mayor Erion Veliaj. These actions led to Russia including Albania on its official list of "unfriendly countries". Albania's honorary consulate in Kharkiv was shelled and destroyed by Russian forces, there were no casualties as its staff had evacuated the building.

In mid March, Albania and five other countries at the UN Security Council accused Russia of having committed war crimes in Ukraine. In Albania, President Meta, Foreign Minister Xhaçka and the Speaker of Parliament Lindita Nikolla all condemned Russia for the Bucha massacre and called for an international response and independent investigation. Albania voted for a successful UN General Assembly resolution to suspend Russia from the UN Human Rights Council. In late September 2022, Russia vetoed a UN Security Council resolution tabled by Albania and the US opposing the Russian annexation of occupied areas of Ukraine.

== See also ==
- Foreign relations of Albania
- Foreign relations of Russia
- List of ambassadors of Albania to Russia
- Soviet-Albanian Split
- The Great Warrior Skanderbeg – a 1953 co-production of Soviet-Albanian movie
- Albanians in Russia
- Russians in Albania

== Sources ==
- Hoxha, E. (1984). The Khrushchevites (PDF) (Second ed.). Tirana: 8 Nëntori Publishing House.
- Vickers, M. (1999). The Albanians: A Modern History. New York: I. B. Tauris & Co Ltd.
