= List of ambassadors of Albania to Poland =

List of ambassadors of Albania to Poland:

Name	Period	Title	Presented credentials	Ref
Mihal Prifti	1949-1950	Envoy Extraordinary and Minister Plenipotentiary	27 April 1949	
Nesti Nase	1950-1952	Charge d'Affaires ad interim	11 November 1950	
Petro Papi	1952-1957	Envoy Extraordinary and Minister Plenipotentiary	20 June 1952	
Musin Kroi	1957-1961	Ambassador	23 October 1957	
Jovan Andoni	1961	Charge d'Affaires ad interim	18 July 1961	
Bato Karafili	1961-1965	Ambassador	7 November 1961	
Shoku Koco Prifti	1965-1966	Ambassador	4 February 1965	
Gac Mazi	1966-1968	Charge d'Affaires ad interim	14 May 1966	
Saba Hasa	1968-1972	Charge d'Affaires ad interim	23 October 1968	
Ndreçi Rizo	1972-1975	Charge d'Affaires ad interim	1 March 1972	
Leonard Zissi	1975-1976	Charge d'Affaires ad interim	3 November 1975	
Miltiadh Bode	1976-1979	Charge d'Affaires ad interim	16 September 1976	
Llazar Muço	1979-1981	Charge d'Affaires ad interim	10 May 1979	
Selim Begolli	1981-1984	Charge d'Affaires ad interim	30 October 1981	
Viron Tane	1984-1991	Charge d'Affaires ad interim	12 July 1984	
Tatjana Hajnaj	1991-1992	Charge d'Affaires ad interim	29 September 1991	
Enver Faja	1992-1997	Ambassador	14 October 1992	
Osman Kraja	1997-2003	Ambassador	27 November 1997	
Sokol Gjoka	2003-2007	Ambassador	9 January 2003	
Florent Çeliku	2007-2014	Ambassador	10 September 2007	
Shpresa Kureta	2014	Charge d'Affaires ad interim	4 January 2014	
Shpresa Kureta	2014-2023	Ambassador	17 September 2014	
Shkëlzen Macukulli	2023-2024	Charge d'Affaires ad interim	31 October 2023	
Mimoza Halimi	2024-Present	Ambassador	7 March 2024	
