= Albania–Italy relations =

- Albania: Italy

Diplomatic mission
- Embassy of Albania Rome: Embassy of Italy; Tirana

Albania–Italy relations are the bilateral relations between Albania and Italy.

Due to the strong presence of Albanians in Italy and the historic presence of the Arbëreshë people there, the two countries today enjoy very friendly diplomatic relations. There are frequent high-level contacts between the governments of Albania and Italy. Both countries are members of many international organizations and share common political views about the Balkans and the world, with Italy being a strong supporter of the EU candidacy of Albania. During a visit by Italian Prime Minister Matteo Renzi in Tirana, Albania was considered by Renzi to be Italy's closest partner in the region.

There is a great degree of historical and cultural similarities between Albanians and Italians which has aided cultural relations greatly. Albania is also home to 20,000 Italian migrants and has a 5,000 Italian indigenous community.

The countries are as well members of the North Atlantic Treaty Organization, Organization for Security and Co-operation in Europe and the Council of Europe. As a member and founder of the European Union (EU), Italy supports Albania in its euro-integration path and is considered one of the strongest supporters of Albania.

== History ==
=== Modern history ===
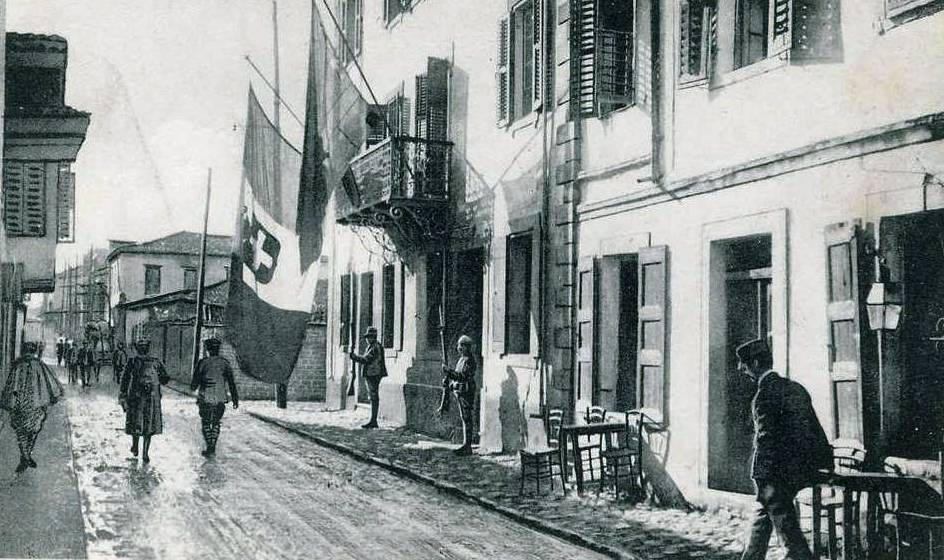
Italian soldiers in Vlorë, Albania during World War I. The tricolour flag of Italy bearing the Savoy royal shield is shown hanging alongside an Albanian flag from the balcony of the Italian headquarters.

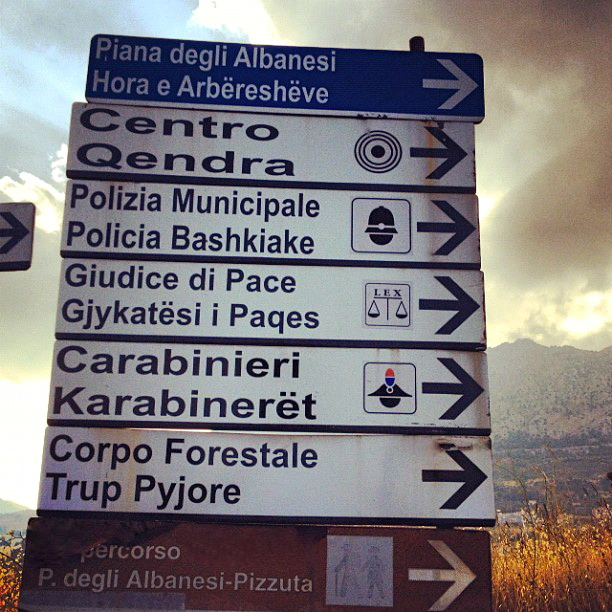
Road signs bilingual, in Italian and Albanian in Piana degli Albanesi

Formal relations between the two countries commenced in 1912, as the Kingdom of Italy supported the Albanian Declaration of Independence in said year. Italy's policies of the time towards Albania were adopted as a counterbalance to Austria's pressure in the Balkans.

During World War I, the Italian protectorate over Albania was established by the Kingdom of Italy in an effort to secure a de jure independent Albania under Italian control. It existed from June 23, 1917, until the summer of 1920. From June 4 to September 3, 1920, a series of battles between Italian forces garrisoned throughout Vlorë region and Albanian nationalists divided in small groups of fighters happened and these battles were later called as the Vlora War, which ended the Italian Protectorate.

Later during the monarchy period and the reign of King Zog, Italy became the closest ally of Albania, making it a de facto protectorate. The Economy was highly dependent on loans and financial aid given from Italy. In the spring of 1925 two important concessions were signed with Italy; the first was the right to found a national bank and the second was the approval of the establishment of an Italian company (SVEA), to develop the economy of Albania. Later the National Bank of Albania was founded with Italian capital and Italy helped to issue and introduce the official currency of Albania, the Lek.

Flag of the Kingdom of Albania (1939–1943) by a decree of King Victor Emanuel III, 28 September 1939.

On April 7, 1939, Mussolini's troops invaded Albania, declaring it again as an Italian protectorate. Despite some stubborn resistance, especially at Durrës, the Italians made short work of the Albanians. King Zog was forced into exile, and the country was made part of the Italian Empire as a separate kingdom in personal union with the Italian crown.

After the capitulation of Italy in 1943, relations between Italy and Albania were interrupted. During the communist rule in Albania, the country was isolated and no relations were carried with western countries, including Italy.

Relations were reestablished after the Fall of communism in Albania. After the breakdown of the communist regime, Italy had been the main immigration target for Albanians leaving their country. This was due to its geographic proximity and because many Albanians viewed Italy as a symbol of the West during the communist period. From March 1997, Italy instituted a strict patrol of the Adriatic in an attempt to curb Albanian immigration. and since then Italy has helped Albania's economy during this transition time. Italy has also helped on restoring law and order in Albania after the 1997 rebellion, through Operation Alba.

In March 2020, during the first wave of the COVID-19 pandemic in Italy, Albania sent Italy 90 doctors and nurses to cope with the pressure the Italian health system was experiencing. This act of solidarity further strengthened the good relations between the two nations.

As part of the 2025 Giro d'Italia, Albania hosted the Grande Partenza section of the race, marking the first time that a Grand Tour took place in the country.

== Economic relations ==
Italy is the main export partner of Albania, with 45.33% of Albanian exports going to Italy in 2020, and also the main import partner, with 25.25% of all products imported by Albania coming from Italy. Italy is one of the biggest donors for Albania and also a big supporter of the Euro-Atlantic integration of the Republic of Albania. Both countries share a maritime border and there is an Exclusive economic zone between them. Italy has financed different projects in many fields, such as political, judicial, energy and tourism.

== High level visits ==
On 24 November 2008, the then Prime Minister of Italy, Silvio Berlusconi, carried a state visit in Tirana, where he met with his counterpart PM Sali Berisha. During this visit an agreement was signed on the construction of two coal-fired power plants, financed by Italy which would help boost Albania's economy.

Former President of Italy, Giorgio Napolitano visited Tirana on 4 March 2014, where he met with the President, the Prime Minister and the Speaker of Parliament and he also held a meeting with the Italian community that lives in Tirana. Later on 10 March governments of both countries signed an agreement on energy cooperation promoting interconnection and integration of electric energy and natural gas systems in both countries, which was important decision for the Trans Adriatic Pipeline project, which will transport natural gas, starting from Greece via Albania and the Adriatic Sea to Italy and further to Western Europe.

On December 20, 2014, the Italian Prime Minister, Matteo Renzi visited Albania, during a state visit in which he met with the PM of Albania Edi Rama, President Bujar Nishani and members of the Italian community in Tirana. During this meeting an agreement on the recognition of pensions was signed. During his speech, PM Renzi said that Albania is Italy's closest ally in the region and that Italy fully supports the future integration of Albania in EU.

On 13 October 2016, the President of the Chamber of Deputies of Italy Laura Boldrini visited Tirana, once again supporting the integration path of Albania and the juridical reform recently passed by the Parliament.

Guest	Host	Place of visit	Date of visit
(Italy) Prime Minister Silvio Berlusconi	(Albania) Prime Minister Sali Berisha	Tirana	28.11.2008
(Albania) President Bujar Nishani	(Italy) President Giorgio Napolitano	Rome	28.12.2012
(Italy) President Giorgio Napolitano	(Albania) President Bujar Nishani and Prime Minister Edi Rama	Tirana	4.3.2014
(Italy) Prime Minister Matteo Renzi	(Albania) President Bujar Nishani and Prime Minister Edi Rama	Tirana	30.12.2014
(Albania) President Bujar Nishani	(Italy) San Cosmo Albanese Commune Cosmo Azzinari (Visited the Arbëreshë population in Calabria)	San Cosmo Albanese	8–9.4.2015
(Albania) President Ilir Meta	(Italy) President Sergio Mattarella	Rome	13–14.9.2015

== 2023 Migration deal ==
On 6 November 2023, Italian Prime Minister Giorgia Meloni and Albanian Prime Minister Edi Rama signed an agreement, called the Protocol on Strengthening Cooperation in the Field of Migration. The protocol allowed Italy, for at least five years, to make use of specified locations in Albania to establish two migrant management facilities, funded and placed under Italian jurisdiction. At the press conference, Meloni referred to the deal as a “strategic partnership” that she said would enhance a "historic friendship" between the two countries.

Building work started in March 2024, with the initial structures finished later that year. The port of Shëngjin hosts an arrival facility, and an asylum complex operates on a nearby military base close to the village of Gjadër. The asylum centre has room for 36,000 migrants but by October 2025, only 256 have been detained there. In most cases, judicial decisions resulted in their return to Italy.

At the November 2025 intergovernmental summit, both leaders portrayed Albania-Italy relations as historic, strategic, and increasingly systemic. Both countries reaffirmed and politically endorsed the 2023 migration protocol, while embedding it within a broader package of bilateral cooperation agreements.

== Transport links ==
Air Albania, ITA Airways, Ryanair and Wizz Air operate flights between Albania and Italy.

== Resident diplomatic missions ==
- Albania has an embassy in Rome and consulates-general in Bari and Milan.
- Italy has an embassy in Tirana and a consulate-general in Vlorë.

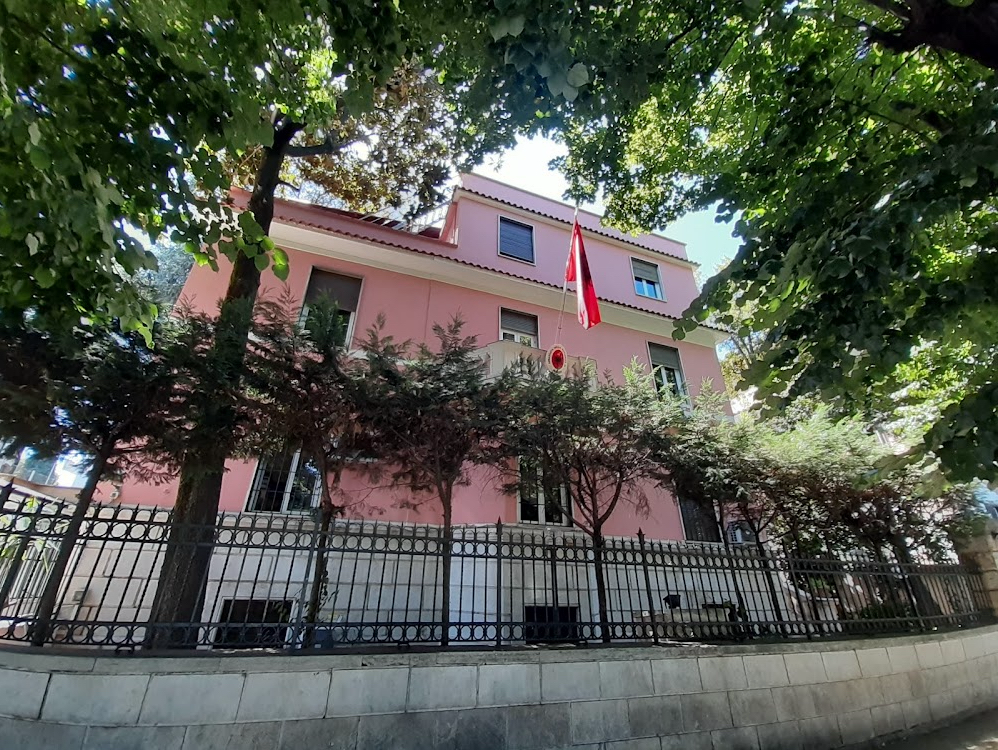
Embassy of Albania in Rome

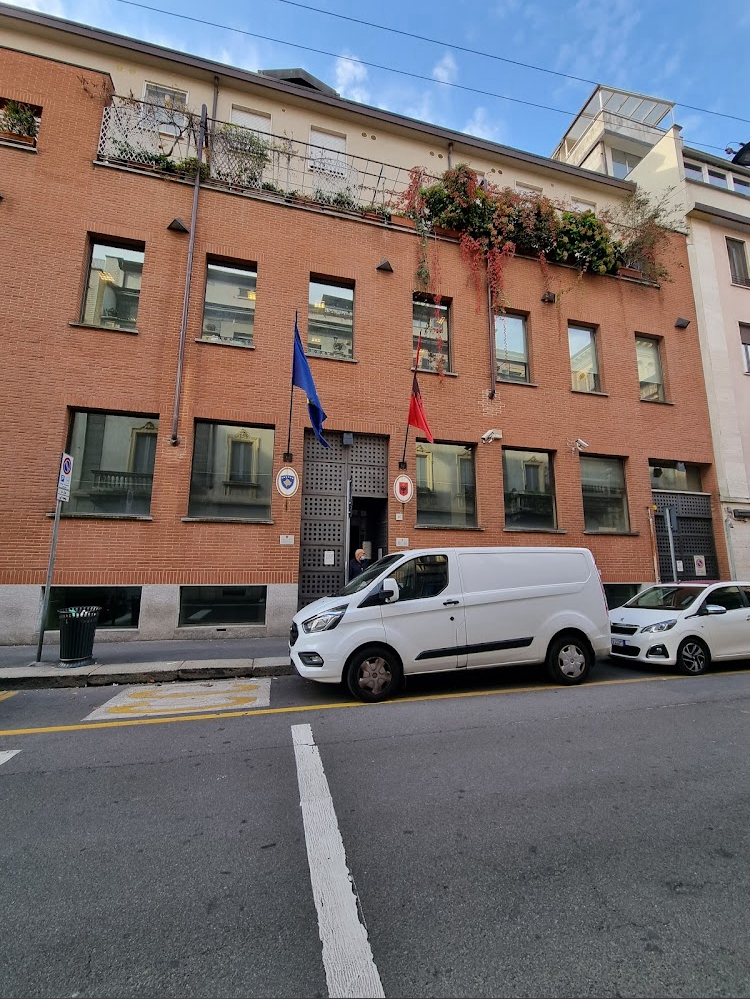
Consulate-General of Albania in Milan

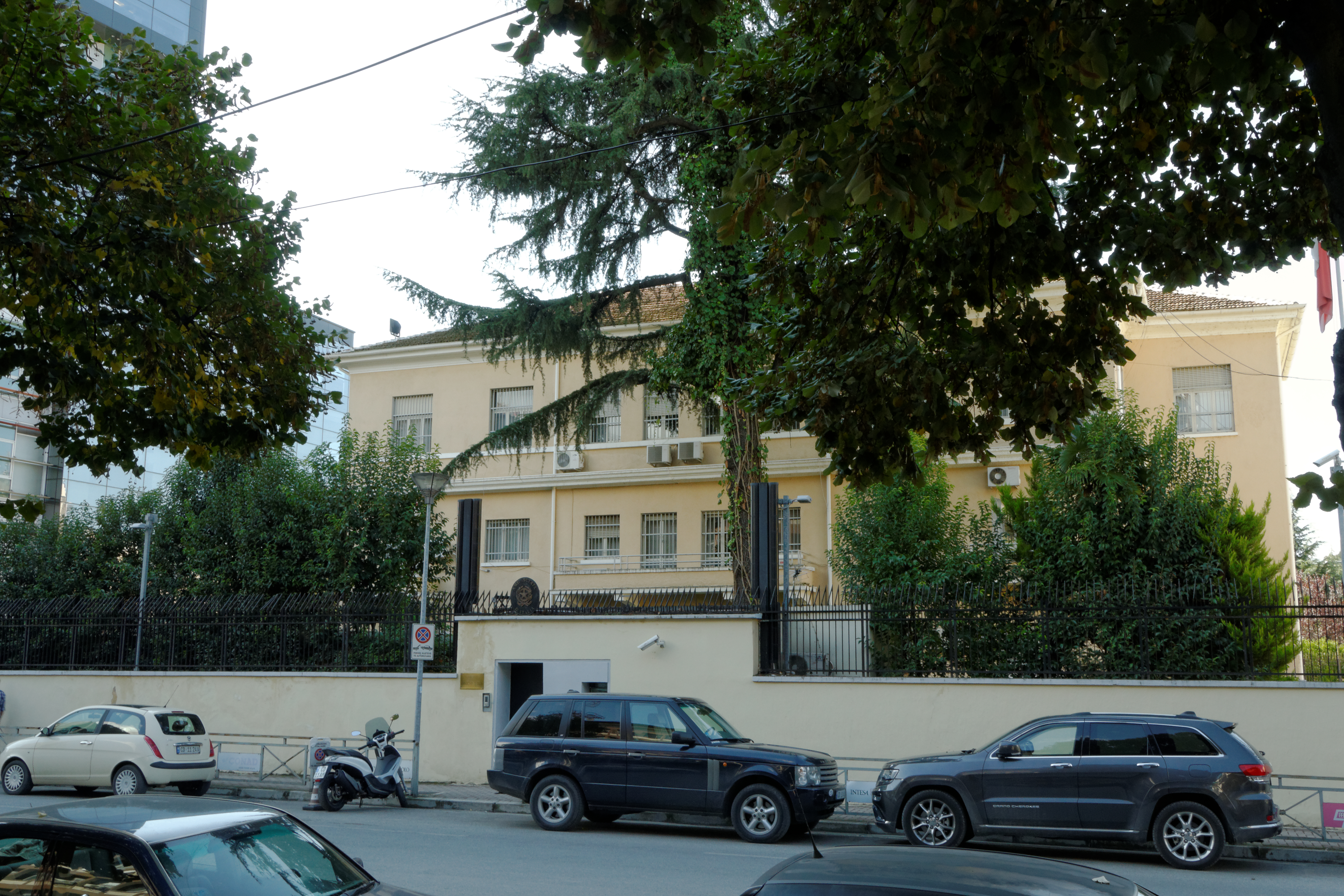
Embassy of Italy in Tirana

== See also ==
- Foreign relations of Albania
- Foreign relations of Italy
- Accession of Albania to the European Union
- Albanians in Italy
- List of ambassadors of Albania to Italy
