= Austria–South Korea relations =

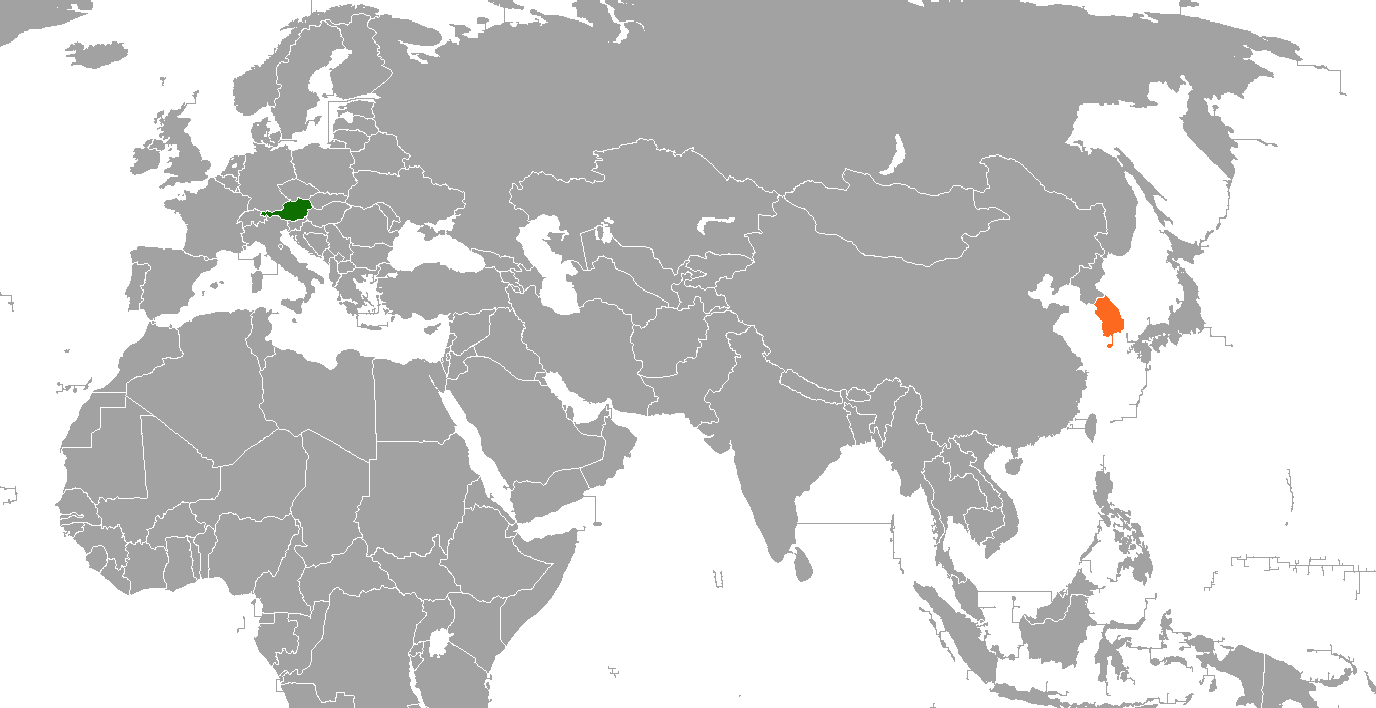
- Austria: South Korea

Foreign relations exist between Austria and South Korea. Diplomatic relations between the two countries were established on May 22, 1963.

== History ==
The first description of Korea by Austrians was by the Jesuit missionary Martino Martini (Italian but then part of the Holy Roman Empire), who introduced Korea in the Novus Atlas Sinensis in 1655 while doing missionary activities in China. The first Austrian Korean contact that is recorded in history happened in 1886, when the Austro Hungarian ship SMS Nautilus (1873) docked at the Korean harbors of Komundo, Pusan and wonsan. Before 1914, total of 10 Austrian empire ships visited korea. In 1894, Austrian American adventurer Ernst von Hesse-Wartegg traveled around Korea, and published a book about his travels, which was influential among German travel literature for 20 years. The first diplomatic treaty between Korea and Austria happened in 1892, with the Austria–Korea Treaty of 1892. In 1893, SMS Kaiserin Elisabeth, the ship which had guests such as Franz Ferdinand aboard (Franz, however, landed in Japan before the ship's arrival in Korea and never visited), arrived in Incheon (Chemulpo), to give the ratification document of the 1892 treaty by Franz Joseph I of Austria to Gojong of Korea, and Gojong sent back a royal armour as a gift, now exhibited in the Kunsthistorisches Museum.

== Diplomatic missions ==
Austria has an embassy in Seoul and an honorary consulate in Busan. South Korea has an embassy in Vienna. The Austrian embassy in Seoul is located in the same building as the Australian embassy, often leading to misdelivered mail and confused visitors.

== Trade ==
In 2007, South Korea was Austria's fourth-largest non-European Union trading partner. Two way trade was valued at about US$1.8 billion that year.

== Bilateral visits ==
In April 2007, the President of Austria Heinz Fischer paid a state visit to South Korea. It was the first ever state visit of an Austrian President to the republic.

== Resident diplomatic missions ==
- Austria has an embassy in Seoul.
- South Korea has an embassy in Vienna.
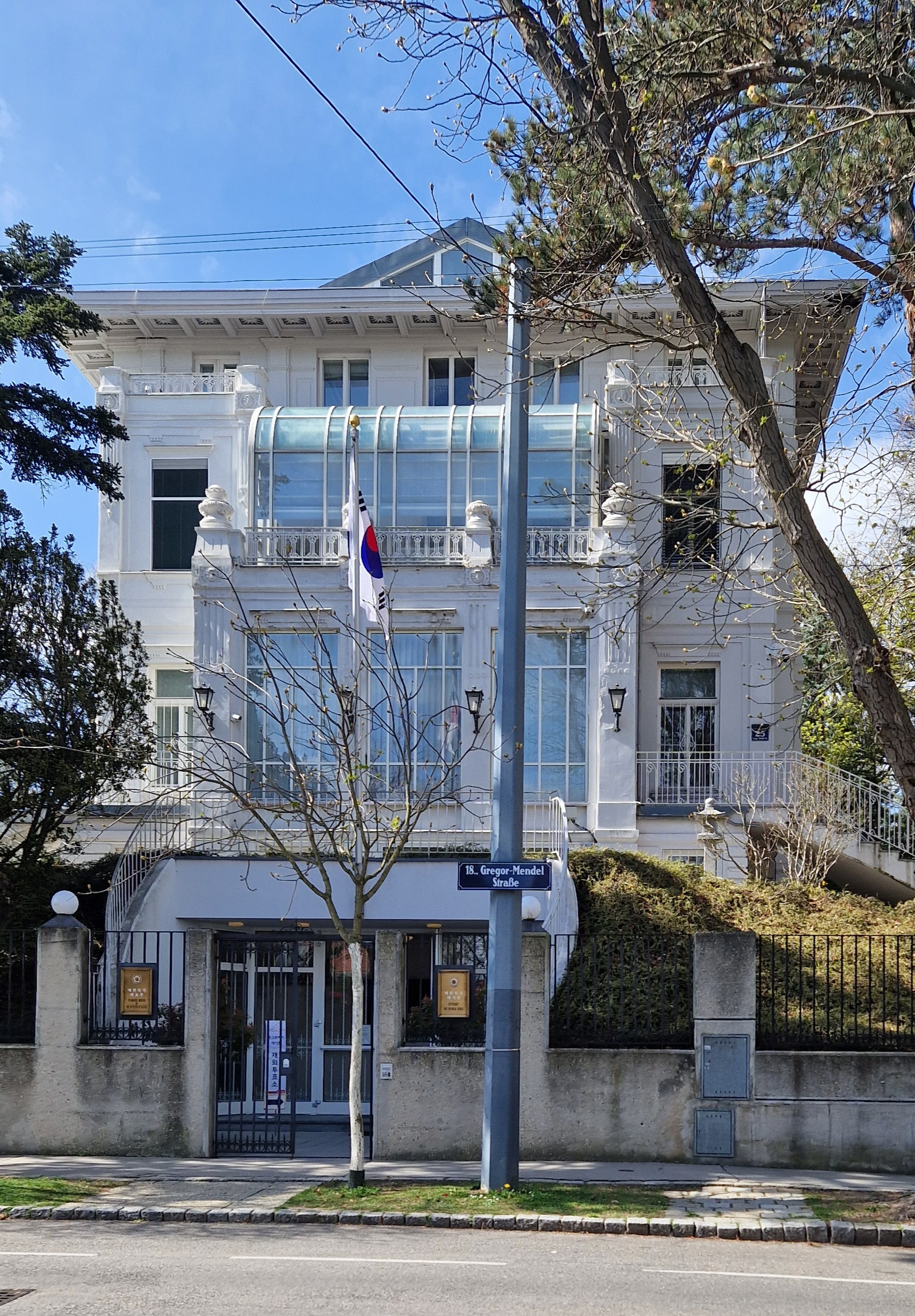
Embassy of South Korea in Vienna

== See also ==
- Foreign relations of Austria
- Foreign relations of South Korea
