= List of ambassadors of Austria to South Korea =

Austrian Ambassador to South Korea
- Coat of Arms of Austria
- Incumbent; Wolfgang Angerholzer since 2020
- Website: http://www.bmeia.gv.at/botschaft/seoul.html

The list of ambassadors from Austria to South Korea began long after diplomatic relations were established in 1892. The current official title of this diplomat is "Ambassador of the Republic of Austria to the Republic of Korea."

Austrian-Korean diplomatic relations were initially established during the Dual Monarchy of the Austro-Hungarian Empire and the Joseon period of Korean history.

After the Austria-Korea Treaty of 1892 was negotiated, ministers from Austria could have been appointed in accordance with this treaty. However, diplomatic affairs were initially handled by the German representative in Seoul.

== List of heads of mission ==
=== Ambassadors ===
- Peter Moser –1985.
- Helmut Boeck
- Wilhelm Donko, 2005–2009
- Josef Müllner, 2009–2013
- Elisabeth Bertagnoli 2013–2017
- Michael Schwarzinger 2017–2020
- Wolfgang Angerholzer 2020 - present

== See also ==
- Austria–South Korea relations
- Austria-Korea Treaty of 1892
- List of diplomatic missions in South Korea
