= Adhurim Resuli =

Albanian diplomat

Adhurim Resuli is an Albanian diplomat. He was born on 29 December 1961 in Vlorë. He served as Ambassador in Budapest, Hungary from 1998 until 2002 and then in Ottawa, Ontario, Canada from 2002 to 2006.
