= Zef Mazi =

Albanian diplomat

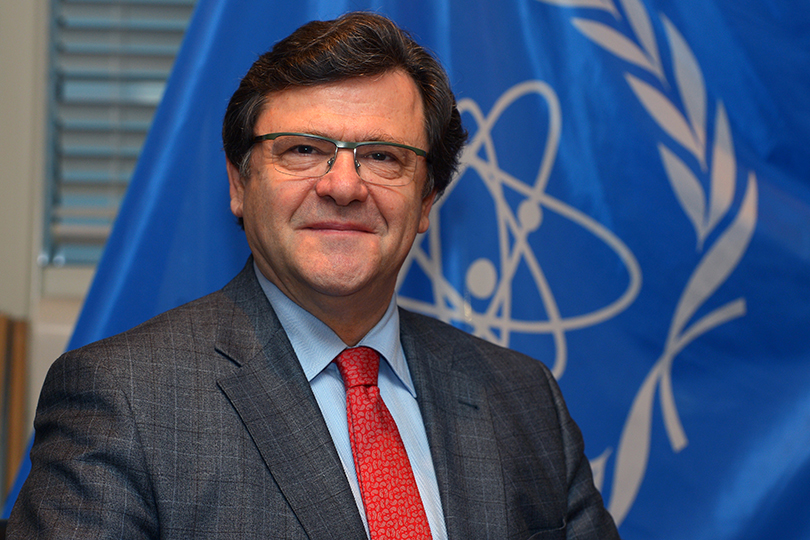
- Born: January 27, 1956 (age 70)

Zef Mazi (born 27 January 1956) is an Albanian diplomat, ambassador, who has served as Albania's Chief Negotiator with the European Union during 2020-2022. He previously served as Special Assistant to the Director General for Strategy at the International Atomic Energy Agency (IAEA) from 2011 to 2018, where he has been in charge for Agency-wide strategy formulation, planning and implementation, as well as risk-management and knowledge management.

== Life ==
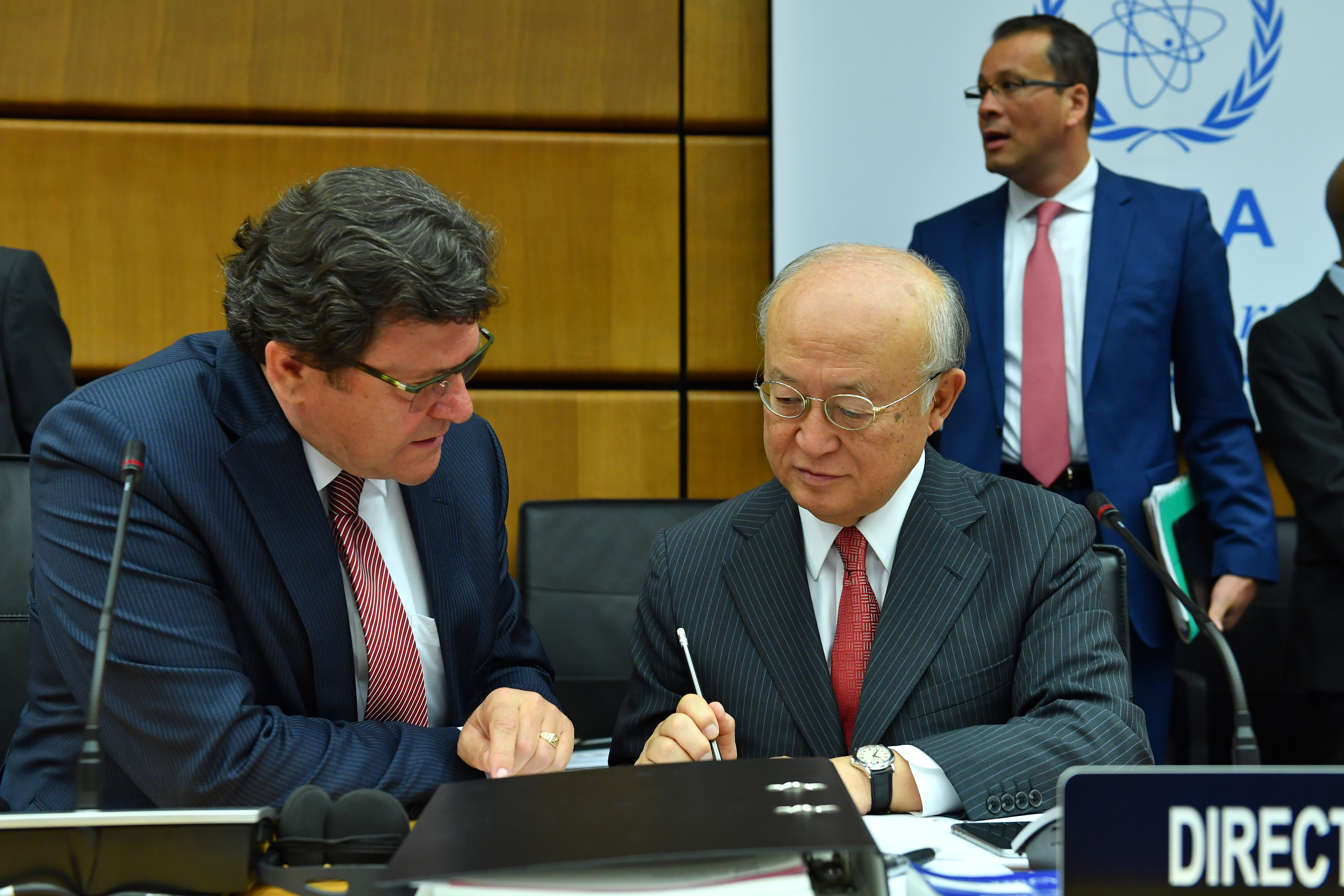
Zef Mazi & Yukiya Amano (IAEA)

Mazi was born in Tirana, Albania. He graduated from the Faculty of History and Philology, University of Tirana, for English and Albanian language and letters in 1977, and further studied international law.

Mazi was Ambassador of the Republic of Albania to the United Kingdom of Great Britain and Northern Ireland as well as to the Republic of Ireland from 2007 until 2011. Previously, Mazi was Ambassador and Permanent Representative of Albania to the United Nations Office at Vienna, the International Atomic Energy Agency, the Organization for Security and Co-operation in Europe (OSCE), the United Nations Industrial Development Organization (UNIDO), the Comprehensive Nuclear-Test-Ban Treaty Organization (CTBTO) and other International Organizations in Vienna from 1992–1997 and 2002–2007 respectively. He was appointed Director of the UN Department in the MFA in 2007. He served in the OSCE Secretariat and the IAEA Secretariat (1998-2002) and was Head of Mission at the Embassy of Republic of Albania to Austria and the Swiss Confederation (1991–1992). Mazi served as Chairman of the OSCE Forum for Security Co-operation in 2013.

Mazi also served in the Multilateral Department at the MFA in Tirana and was a member of the Albanian permanent delegation to the negotiations on the resumption of diplomatic relations between Albania and the United Kingdom (1989–1991). He also served as Head of International Relations Department at the General Directorate of PTT (1987–1988). While he served as translator/editor at the Publishing House and University lecturer (1978-1987), he worked part-time as radio announcer in Radio Tirana, foreign language service.

Mazi was a presidential candidate in Albania's 2002 presidential elections as well as Albania's nominee/candidate for the Secretary General of the OSCE.

== Lectures and publications ==
Mazi has been invited as guest lecturer on topics of international relations and politics to address a number of issues specifically related to security, strategy, nuclear and politico-military topics. He has also contributed numerous articles on political issues about Albania and the Balkans in the Albanian and international media as well as in that of Kosovo.

- "Albania in the New Europe" – University of Vienna, Austria (1995);
- "Kosova's Independence under International Law" – London School of Economics, University of Birmingham, St Anthony's College at Oxford University, United Kingdom (2008-2011);
- "Security of Small States in Western Balkans – Perceptions and Perspectives" – London School of Economics, United Kingdom (2009);
- "Albania's Security and Foreign policy in the Balkan context", Mid-Atlantic Group, London (2010);
- "Albania's Integration Perspectives for NATO and EU", Conservative Council, British Parliament, London, UK (2008);
- "Albania's political and financial state – a perspective", CitiGroup Headquarters, The City, London, UK (2009);
- "War in ex-Yugoslavia and Security of Western Balkans" – Geneva Centre for Security Policy; Geneva, Switzerland (2006);
- "OSCE's Role in Peace-keeping Operations" – OSCE Peace Keeping Seminar, Vienna (2006);
- "Reflections on the Politico-Military Dimension, Role of the Forum for Security Cooperation" – Geneva Centre for Security Policy, Seminar with the MFA, Sofia, Bulgaria (2005);
- "NATO Enlargement and Security of Small States", Albanian Atlantic Association, 8th Annual Conference; Tirana (2005);
- "Activities Related to the Military Aspects of Security" – Geneva Centre for Security Policy, Seminar, MFA, Ljubljana, Slovenia (2003);
- "How to Reunite the OSCE's Strength with Trust and Respect" – Helsinki Monitor Conference on OSCE: Life Begins at 30, Netherlands Helsinki Committee, Vienna (1994);
- "Conflict in South Eastern Europe – and Road to Peace", Ambassador's Series, London School of Economics, London, UK; (2010);
- "Albania's Religious Harmony", Oxford Student's Union, University of Oxford, UK (2009);
- "Security Perspectives and Cross Border Co-operation in SEE" – Oxford Summit of Leaders, Oxford Town Hall, Oxford, UK (2010);
- "IAEA's Medium Term Strategy 2012-2017", American Nuclear Association Convention, Texas A&M University, Texas, USA (2015);

Mazi has also published and translated books from English into Albanian and vice versa.

- "A Guide-Book to Albanian" (1983);
- "Twenty Years of Balkan Tangle" (translation from English into Albanian 1988);
- "Vikinget" (translation into Albanian, 1986);
- "New Albania" Magazine (from Albania into English, translation/publication, 1980–1989);
- "Balkan Ghost" (One Chapter, translation from English 2002);

== Honours ==
- "Medal of Recognition for Outstanding Contribution to UNIDO" (2007);
- "Golden Medallion", Three Faiths Forum, London, UK (2011);
- "Medal of Recognition", Government of Kazakhstan (2015);
- Order "Grand Officier" – Byzantine Order of the Knights of the Holy Grave (1993);
