= List of ambassadors of Albania to Hungary =

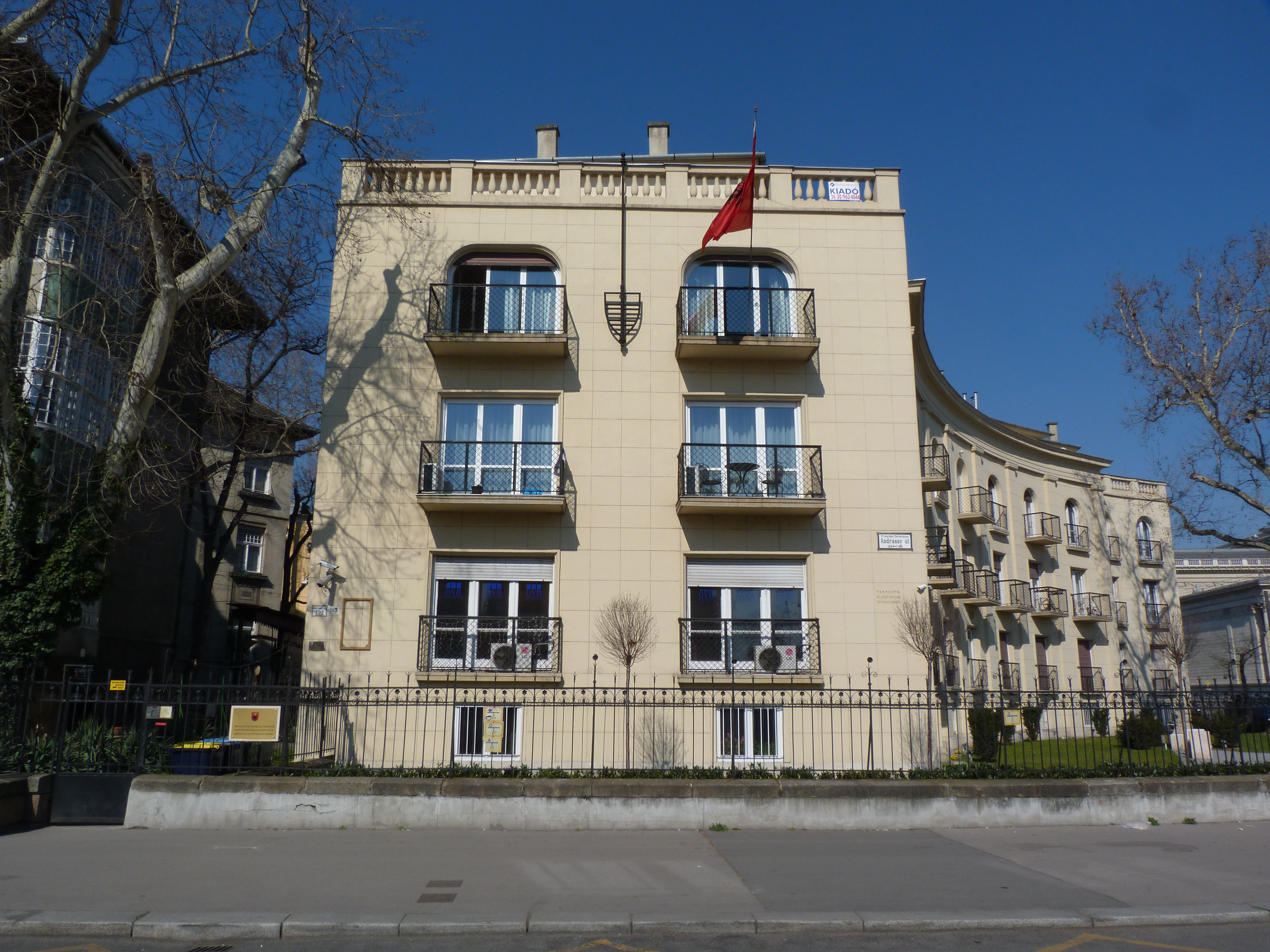
Embassy of Albania in Budapest

Diplomatic relations between Albania and Hungary were established for the first time in March 1922 with credentials presented on May 31 of that same year.

== List of diplomatic representatives of Albania to Hungary (1923–present) ==
No.	Name	Title	Term served
1	Nik Pema	Consul	1923	1925
2	Tuk Jakova	Emissary	1947	1949
3	Petro Papi	Emissary	1949	1952
4	Musin Kroi	Emissary	1952	1954
5	Piro Koci	Ambassador	1954	1956
6	Bato Karafili	Ambassador	1956	1958
7	Edip Cuci	Ambassador	1958	1961
8	Lutfi Mehmeti	Chargè d'affaires	1961	1963
9	Jovan Andoni	Chargè d'affaires	1963	1965
10	Dhori Samsuri	Chargè d'affaires	1965	1967
11	Latif Shehu	Chargè d'affaires	1967	1971
12	Nexhmedin Luari	Chargè d'affaires	1971	1973
13	Dhimitër Stamo	Chargè d'affaires	1973	1975
14	Jani Polena	Chargè d'affaires	1976	1984
15	Shpëtim Çaushi	Chargè d'affaires	1984	1986
16	Çlirim Muzha	Chargè d'affaires	1986	1990
17	Jani Polena	Ambassador	1990	1992
18	Lisen Bashkurti	Ambassador	1992	1993
19	Roland Bimo	Ambassador	1994	1997
20	Përparim Dervishi	Ambassador	1997	1998
21	Adhurim Resuli	Ambassador	1998	2002
22	Eduard Sulo	Ambassador	2002	2006
23	Florian Nova	Ambassador	2006	2010
24	Mira Hoxha	Ambassador	2011	2015
25	Arian Spasse	Ambassador	2015	2022
26	Ilirian Kuka	Ambassador	2024	present
