= List of ambassadors of Albania to the United Kingdom =

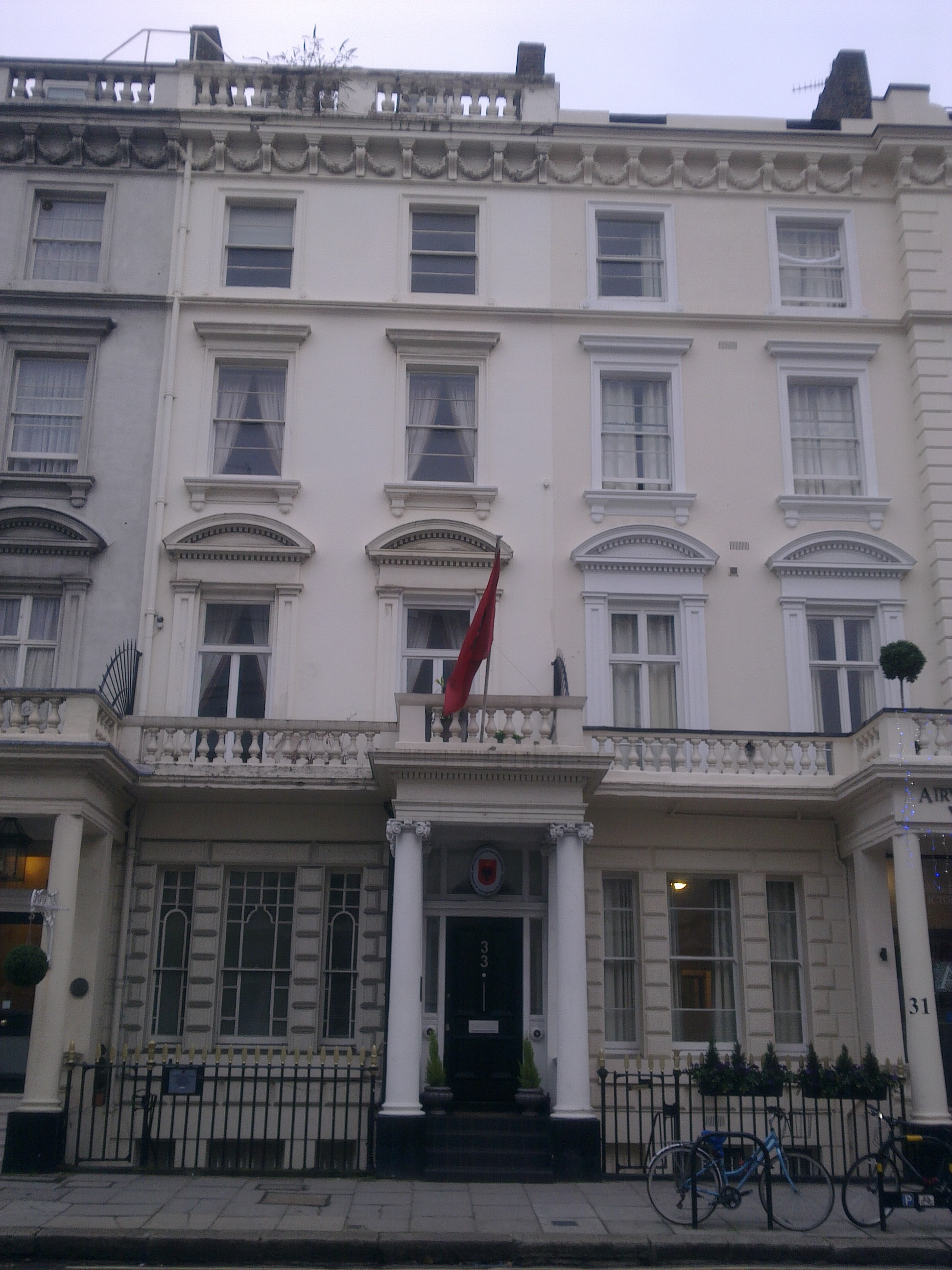
Embassy of Albania in London

Diplomatic relations between Albania and the United Kingdom were established on November 9, 1921. The British government recognized the post-war Democratic Government of Albania on November 29, 1944, but the British mission left in April 1946 due to the limitations that the Albanian government of the time had imposed regarding the movement of the members of its mission. The Corfu Channel incident in May 1946 marked the end of these relations. Diplomatic relations between the two countries were restored on May 29, 1991, through a joint communiqué by both parties.

== List of diplomatic representatives of Albania to the United Kingdom (1922–present) ==
No.	Name	Title	Term served
1	Mehmed Konica	Ambassador	1922	1924
2	Iliaz Vrioni	Ambassador	1925	1926
3	Xhemal Frashëri	Consul	1925	1926
4	Maliq Libohova	Consul	1926	1927
5	Eqrem Vlora	Ambassador	1927	1929
6	Iliaz Vrioni	Ambassador	1929	1932
7	Xhemil Dino	Ambassador	1932	1933
8	Fuat Asllani	Ambassador	1934	1935
9	Lec Kurti	Ambassador	1935	1939
10	Dervish Duma	Consul	1936	1939
11	Pavli Qesku	Ambassador	1991	1997
12	Agim Fagu	Ambassador	1998	2002
13	Kastriot Robo	Ambassador	2002	2007
14	Zef Mazi	Ambassador	2007	2011
15	Teuta Starova	Chargé d'affaires	2011	2012
16	Mal Berisha	Ambassador	2012	2015
17	Qirjako Qirko	Ambassador	2016	2023
18	Uran Ferizi	Ambassador	2024	present
