= Austria–Korea Treaty of 1892 =

1892 treaty between Austro-Hungary and Korea

The Austria–Korea Treaty of 1892 was negotiated between representatives of the Austro-Hungarian Empire and Joseon Korea.

== Background ==
In 1876, Korea established a trade treaty with Japan after Japanese ships approached Ganghwado and threatened to fire on the Korean capital city. Treaty negotiations with several Western countries were made possible by the completion of this initial Japanese overture.

In 1882, the Americans concluded a treaty and established diplomatic relations, which served as a template for subsequent negotiations with other Western powers.

== Treaty provisions ==
The Austrians and Koreans negotiated and approved a multi-article treaty with provisions similar to other Western nations.

Ministers from Austria to Korea could have been appointed in accordance with this treaty; but diplomatic affairs were handled by the German diplomats in East Asia.

The treaty remained in effect even after the protectorate was established in 1905.

== See also ==
- Unequal treaties
- List of Ambassadors from Austria to South Korea
