= Ardiana Hobdari =

Albanian diplomat

Ardiana Hobdari is an Albanian diplomat. She was the Ambassador Extraordinary and Plenipotentiary of the Republic of Albania to Greece until she was dismissed in March 2019. She has also represented Albania at the Council of Europe.

== Biography ==
In 2015, Hobdari was chair of the Rapporteur Group for Social and Health Questions (GR-SOC) at the Council of Europe.

Hobdari was appointed as Ambassador Extraordinary and Plenipotentiary of the Republic of Albania to Greece in 2017. Hobdari was also Ambassador to Armenia, presenting her credentials to the Armenian President Serzh Sargsyan and Deputy Foreign Minister Garen Nazarian in 2018.

Hobdari was dismissed from her diplomatic position in March 2019, with the embassy staff dismissed in 2020 by Acting Minister for Europe and Foreign Affairs Gent Cakaj. Her dismissal followed a scandal where 100 passports disappeared. She was replaced by Luela Hajdaragaj.
