= List of ambassadors of Albania to Russia =

Albania established diplomatic relations with the Soviet Union on April 7, 1924. In the following decades, relations between the two countries began to deteriorate and on November 25, 1961, the Soviet government under the instructions of premier Khrushchev recalled its ambassador Iosif Shikin. The two countries reestablished diplomatic ties once again furthered by the Collapse of the Soviet Union (Russia being its successor) and the Fall of communism in Albania.

== List of diplomatic representatives of Albania to Russia (1946–present) ==
No.	Name	Title	Term served
1	Kostandin Tashko	Ambassador	1946	1948
2	Mihal Prifti	Ambassador	1948	1954
3	Vasil Nathanaili	Ambassador	1954	1957
4	Nesti Nase	Ambassador	1958	1961
Suspended diplomatic ties (1961–1991)
5	Pertef Hasamataj	Ambassador	1991	1992
6	Arben Cici	Ambassador	1992	1997
7	Shpëtim Çuçko	Ambassador	1997	1998
8	Shaqir Vukaj	Ambassador	1998	2001
9	Avni Xhelili	Ambassador	2001	2005
10	Halit Furriku	Ambassador	2005	2006
11	Teodor Laço	Ambassador	2006	2009
12	Sokol Gjoka	Ambassador	2009	2014
13	Arben Gazioni	Ambassador	2014	Present
