= Stavro Stavri =

Albanian diplomat (1885–1955)

Albanian Ambassador to Yugoslavia
- In office 1925–1925

Albanian Ambassador to Greece
- In office 1926–1928

Member of the Albanian parliament
- In office 25 August 1928 – 11 May 1932
- In office 10 February 1937 – 12 April 1939

Personal details
- Born: 1885 Kavajë, Ottoman Empire
- Died: 1955 (aged 69–70)

Stavro Stavri (1885–1955) was an Albanian diplomat and politician. He served as Albania's ambassador to Yugoslavia (1925) and Greece (1926–28). Stavri also served as a member of the Albanian Parliament for 3 terms.
