= List of ambassadors of Albania to France =

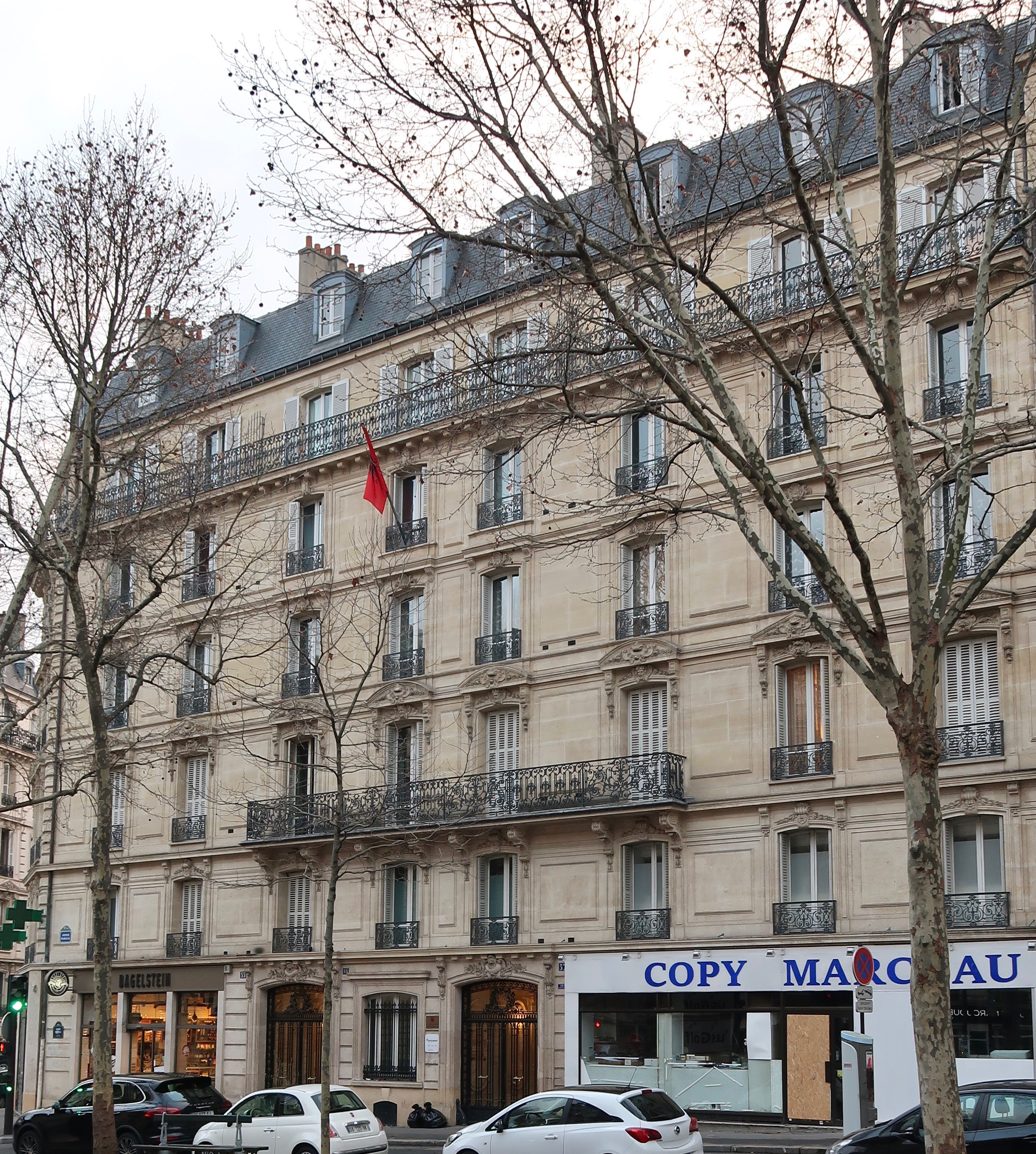
Embassy of Albania in Paris

Albania established diplomatic ties with France in the years following the Paris Peace Conference of 1919. France had played an important role in the survival of the Albanian State. In 1916, it established a military protectorate in the region of Korçë. After World War II, it was the first Western country to reinstate its diplomatic mission in Tirana, doing so in 1945. France also participated in the successful ALBA operation led by Italy in the spring of 1997, which helped restore public order and organize legislative elections in the summer of that year.

== List of diplomatic representatives of Albania to France (1922–present) ==
During communism, an ambassador was known as "Envoy extraordinary and Minister plenipotentary".

| No. | Name | Title | Term served | |
|---|---|---|---|---|
| 1 | Midhat Frashëri | Ambassador | 1922 | 1923 |
| 2 | Xhaferr Vila | Consul | 1925 | 1925 |
| 3 | Iliaz Vrioni | Ambassador | 1925 | 1927 |
| 4 | Dhimitër Kosturi | Consul | 1928 | 1932 |
| 5 | Ekrem Libohova | Ambassador | 1933 | 1936 |
| 6 | Kahreman Ylli | Ambassador | 1946 | 1949 |
| 7 | Behar Shtylla | Ambassador | 1950 | 1952 |
| 8 | Dhimitër Lamani | Ambassador | 1958 | 1962 |
| 9 | Kristaq Misha | Ambassador | 1962 | 1967 |
| 10 | Javer Malo | Ambassador | 1967 | 1975 |
| 11 | Misto Treska | Ambassador | 1979 | 1981 |
| 12 | Petraq Pojani | Ambassador | 1981 | 1982 |
| 13 | Maxhun Peka | Ambassador | 1982 | 1988 |
| 14 | Arqile Semini | Ambassador | 1989 | 1991 |
| 15 | Besnik Mustafaj | Ambassador | 1992 | 1997 |
| 16 | Luan Rama | Ambassador | 1997 | 2001 |
| 17 | Ferit Hoxha | Ambassador | 2001 | 2006 |
| 18 | Ylljet Aliçka | Ambassador | 2007 | 2013 |
| 19 | Dritan Tola | Ambassador | 2013 | Present |
