= List of ambassadors of Albania to Vietnam =

Embassy of Albania in Hanoi was opened on December 10, 1964 with accreditation first Resident Ambassador Shefqet Hekali. On June 24, 1992, Albania closed its embassy in Hanoi and appointed a permanent ambassador to Malaysia, simultaneously accredited to Vietnam. On July 9, 1992, Vietnam closed its embassy in Tirana and appointed an ambassador to Hungary, simultaneously accredited to Albania.

== List of representatives ==
Name	Period	Resident/Non resident	Title	Notes	Presented credentials	Ref
Delo Balili	1956–1959	Non-resident	Ambassador	Resident in Beijing	1956	
Mihal Prifti	1959–1961	Non-resident	Ambassador	Resident in Beijing	1959	
Reiz Malile	1962–1963	Non-resident	Ambassador	Resident in Beijing	17 April 1962	
Shefqet Hekali	1964–1969	Resident	Ambassador	Resident in Hanoi	10 December 1964	
Jorgji Shuli	1969–1973	Resident	Ambassador	Resident in Hanoi	16 January 1969	
Astrit Mero	1973–1977	Resident	Ambassador	Resident in Hanoi	20 April 1973	
Izedin Hajdini	1977–1980	Resident	Ambassador	Resident in Hanoi	March 1977	
Maxhun Peka	1980–1983	Resident	Ambassador	Resident in Hanoi	October 1980	
Syrja Laze	1983–1989	Resident	Ambassador	Resident in Hanoi	March 1983	
Gezim Dhrima	1989–1992	Resident	Ambassador	Resident in Hanoi	1989-24 June 1992	
