= List of ambassadors of Albania to Algeria =

Embassy of Albania in Algeria was opened on 12 February 1963 with accreditation first Resident Ambassador to Algeria Muhsin Kroi. Embassy in Algeria was closed in 1992.

List of Ambassadors of Albania to Algeria:

Name	Period	Title	Presented credentials	Ref
Muhsin Kroi	1963-1965	Ambassador	12 February 1963	
Riza Taushani	1965-1967	Ambassador	1965	
Rifat Dedja	1967-1970	Ambassador	1967	
Riza Taushani	1970-1972	Ambassador	4 September 1970	
Dhimitër Spano	1972-1976	Ambassador	1972	
Syrja Laze	1976-1980	Ambassador	1976	
Nesip Kaçi	1980-1986	Ambassador	22 October 1980	
Dhimitër Stamo	1986-1990	Ambassador	7 December 1986	
Sulejman Tomçini	1990-1992	Ambassador	1990	
