= List of ambassadors of Albania to the Czech Republic =

Albania opened its Legation in Prague on 24 August 1949 with accreditation Zija Dibra as Envoy Extraordinary and Minister Plenipotentiary. M. Dibra is the first representative of Albania to be appointed to Prague.Before this, from 1927 to 1939, Albania had only an Honorary Consul in Prague. In 1958 Legations was raised to Embassy level. But from 1961 to 1991 the relations was downgraded to the level of chargé d'affaires ad interim.

== List of representatives ==
Name	Period	Title	Presented credentials	Ref
Zija Dibra	1949–1951	Minister	24 August 1949	
Halim Budo	1951–1953	Minister	8 January 1951	
Koço Prifti	1953–1958	Minister	22 December 1953	
Siri Çarçani	1958–1961	Ambassador	1958	
Kujtim Myzyri	1965–1971	Charge d'Affaires a.i.	January 1965	
Pandi Allabashi	1971–1973	Charge d'Affaires a.i.	1971	
Sulejman Myftiu	1973–1975	Charge d'Affaires a.i.	July 1973	
Agim Kasa	1975–1976	Charge d'Affaires a.i.	November 1975	
Nfaslli Cuka	1976–1977	Charge d'Affaires a.i.	December 1976	
Agim Kasa	1977–1985	Charge d'Affaires a.i.	1977	
Idriz Drhami	1985–1991	Charge d'Affaires a.i.	4 October 1985	
Ismail Abedin Farka	1993–1995	Ambassador	1993	
Sherif Binak Çaushi	1995–1998	Ambassador	14 June 1995	
Piro Milkani	1998–2002	Ambassador	10 December 1998	
Shaqir Vukaj	2002–2006	Ambassador	15 October 2002	
Qazim Tepshi	2006–2010	Ambassador	12 October 2006	
Genc Pecani	2010–2014	Charge d'Affaires a.i.	15 December 2010	
Riza Poda	2014–2018	Ambassador	16 December 2014	
Ilirian Kuka	2018–2024	Ambassador	6 December 2018	
Ilir Tepelena	2024–Present	Ambassador	15 February 2024	
