= Shpresa Kureta =

Albanian ambassador to Poland

Dr. Shpresa Kureta (born 28 April 1959 in Korçë) is the Albanian ambassador to Poland. She is also Ambassador Non-resident to Estonia, Latvia, Lithuania, and Ukraine. Kureta began her tenure in September 2014.

Kureta was also ambassador to Austria from 2001 until 2005.
