= Sokol Gjoka =

Albanian diplomat

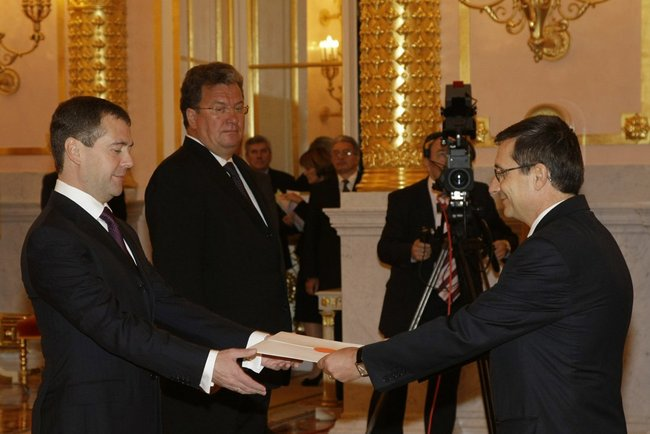
Gjoka presenting his credentials to Dmitry Medvedev in October 2009.

Sokol Gjoka is an Albanian diplomat who served as ambassador of Albania to the Russian Federation until 2014. He presented his credentials to Russian president Dmitry Medvedev on 12 October 2009. He now works at the Albanian Ministry for Europe and Foreign Affairs.
