= List of ambassadors of Albania to Turkey =

History:

On April 13, 1926, the first Albanian representative in Turkey, Rauf Fico, presented his credentials in the rank of Minister Extraordinary and Plenipotentiary. In the same year, the first Minister Plenipotentiary of Turkey in Tirana, Tahir Lutfi Bey, also presented his credentials. After the annexation of Albania by Italy on April 7, 1939, these relations were interrupted. On June 4, 1958, the Turkish side responded positively with a diplomatic note to Albania's request for the establishment of diplomatic relations between the two countries.

On May 27, 1959, the Minister Extraordinary and Plenipotentiary, Skënder Konica, presented his credentials in Ankara and the Albanian Legation began its normal functioning. In Tirana, the Minister Plenipotentiary of Turkey, Hasan Nurelgin, presented his credentials on July 7, 1959. Legations was raised to Embassy status in 1966.

List of Heads of Mission of Albania to Turkey:

| Name | Period | Title | Presented credentials | Ref |
|---|---|---|---|---|
| Rauf Fico | 1926 | Envoy Extraordinary and Minister Plenipotentiary | 13 April 1926 | |
| Asaf Xhaxhuli | 1926–1931 | Charge d'Affaires | September 1926 | |
| Xhavit Leskoviku | 1931–1933 | Charge d'Affaires | 1931 | |
| Xhavit Leskoviku | 1933–1938 | Envoy Extraordinary and Minister Plenipotentiary | 14 May 1933 | |
| Asaf Xhaxhuli | 1938–1939 | Envoy Extraordinary and Minister Plenipotentiary | 1938 | |
| Skënder Konica | 1959–1964 | Envoy Extraordinary and Minister Plenipotentiary | 27 May 1959 | |
| Beqir Isufi | 1964–1966 | Envoy Extraordinary and Minister Plenipotentiary | 24 November 1964 | |
| Beqir Isufi | 1966–1971 | Ambassador | 10 December 1966 | |
| Ylvi Lulo | 1971–1979 | Ambassador | June 1971 | |
| Gjylani Shehu | 1979–1982 | Ambassador | April 1979 | |
| Rasim Dedja | 1982–1984 | Ambassador | 1982 | |
| Gjylani Shehu | 1984–1988 | Ambassador | 1984 | |
| Nesip Kaçi | 1988–1991 | Ambassador | February 1988 | |
| Ismail Lleshi | 1991–1992 | Ambassador | November 1991 | |
| Skënder Shkupi | 1992–1997 | Ambassador | September 1992 | |
| Saimir Bala | 1997–2000 | Ambassador | 1997 | |
| Dashnor Dervishi | 2000–2002 | Ambassador | 4 October 2000 | |
| Jonuz Begaj | 2002–2006 | Ambassador | 2002 | |
| Neritan Kolgjini | 2006–2008 | Charge d'Affaires ad interim | 2006 | |
| Altin Kodra | 2008–2013 | Ambassador | 20 March 2008 | |
| Genci Muçaj | 2013–2016 | Ambassador | 1 March 2013 | |
| Genti Gazheli | 2016–2020 | Ambassador | 14 June 2016 | |
| Kastriot Robo | 2020–2024 | Ambassador | 10 March 2020 | |
| Blerta Kadzadej | 2024–Present | Ambassador | 12 March 2024 | |
