= List of ambassadors of Albania to Romania =

List of Ambassadors of Albania to Romania:

Name	Period	Title	Presented credentials	Ref
Xhemil Dino	1926	Envoy Extraordinary and Minister Plenipotentiary	23 January 1926	
Selaudin Blloshmi	1926–1928	Minister Resident	22 September 1926	
Vello Djafer	1930–1937	Minister Resident	1930	
Pandeli Nasse	1937–1939	Chargé d'Affaires	15 April 1937	
Theodor Heba	1948–1949	Envoy Extraordinary and Minister Plenipotentiary	16 June 1948	
Vasil Konomi	1949–1955	Envoy Extraordinary and Minister Plenipotentiary	15 March 1949	
Mihal Lako	1955–1958	Ambassador	1 February 1955	
Hasan Alimerko	1958–1961	Ambassador	25 April 1958	
Rapi Gjermeni	1961–1966	Ambassador	3 October 1961	
Josif Pogaçe	1966–1970	Ambassador	23 May 1966	
Nikolla Profi	1970–1976	Ambassador	24 June 1970	
Nesip Kaçi	1976–1980	Ambassador	27 September 1976	
Jordan Pani	1980–1984	Ambassador	24 September 1980	
Zoi Toska	1984–1989	Ambassador	8 September 1984	
Piro Vito	1989–1992	Ambassador	21 April 1989	
Zef Fran Çukaj	1992–1997	Ambassador	21 August 1992	
Marko Bello	1997–2000	Ambassador	21 November 1997	
Leonidha Mërtiri	2000–2006	Ambassador	10 December 2000	
Dashnor Dervishi	2006–2010	Ambassador	7 June 2006	
Luan Topçiu	2010–2011	Chargé d'Affaires a.i.	8 June 2010	
Sami Shiba	2011–2015	Ambassador	7 February 2011	
Ilir Tepelena	2015–2023	Ambassador	29 January 2015	
Enkeleda Mërkuri	2024–Present	Ambassador	22 January 2024	
