= List of ambassadors of Albania to Egypt =

The Albanian Legation in Cairo was first opened on July 26, 1936, but closed after Albania was annexed by Italy in 1939. The Legation was re-opened in 1956, and in 1958 it was upgraded to the status of an embassy.

List of Heads of Mission of Albania to Egypt:

Name	Period	Title	Presented credentials	Ref
Abdyl Sula	26.7.1936-16.4.1939	Charge d'Affaires	26 July 1936	
Ulvi Lulo	1956-1958	Envoy Extraordinary and Minister Plenipotentiary	1956	
Ulvi Lulo	1958-1959	Ambassador	4 August 1958	
Delo Balili	1959-1963	Ambassador	14 September 1959	
Edip Çuçi	1963-1965	Ambassador	23 January 1963	
Ulvi Lulo	1965-1969	Ambassador	22 April 1965	
Sami Gjebero	1969-1970	Ambassador	12 February 1969	
Ajet Simixhiu	1970-1975	Ambassador	September 1970	
Zeqi Agolli	1975-1977	Ambassador	4 February 1975	
Sulejman Tomçini	1977-1980	Ambassador	March 1977	
Murat Angoni	1980-1984	Ambassador	October 1980	
Alkyz Cerga	1984-1991	Ambassador	June 1984	
Agim Kasa	1991-1993	Ambassador	1991	
Faruk Borova	1993-1997	Ambassador	1993	
Haki Shtalbi	1997-2002	Ambassador	1997	
Viktor Kalemi	2002-2006	Ambassador	1 September 2002	
Ilir Hoxha	2006-2010	Charge d'Affaires a.i.	March 2006	
Nuri Domi	2009-2014	Ambassador	17 August 2009	
Eduard Sulo	2014-2024	Ambassador	9 October 2014	
Sami Shiba	2024-Present	Ambassador	14 July 2024	
