= List of ambassadors of Albania to Argentina =

Albanian Embassy in Argentina was opened on 22 February 1974 with accreditation first Resident Ambassador Kujtim Myzyri.Embassy was closed for economic reason in 1991 and reopened 29 November 1993.The embassy was closed again in 2014.

List of Ambassadors of Albania to Argentina:

| Name | Period | Title | Presented credentials | Ref |
|---|---|---|---|---|
| Kujtim Myzyri | 1974-1977 | Ambassador | 22 February 1974 | |
| Sezai Shyti | 1977-1982 | Ambassador | 12 December 1977 | |
| Petraq Vaso | 1982-1985 | Charge d'Affaires a.i. | 1982 | |
| Piro Andoni | 1985-1991 | Ambassador | 1985 | |
| Teri Suzan Pojani | 1994-1997 | Ambassador | 2 January 1994 | |
| Gilbert Galanxhi | 1997-1998 | Charge d'Affaires a.i. | 1997 | |
| Edmond Trako | 1998-2004 | Ambassador | 1998 | |
| Banush Gozhdari | 2005-2006 | Ambassador | 2005 | |
| Ylli Pollo | 2006-2007 | Ambassador | 2006 | |
| Rezar Bregu | 2007-2014 | Ambassador | 24 September 2007 | |
