= List of ambassadors of Albania to Austria =

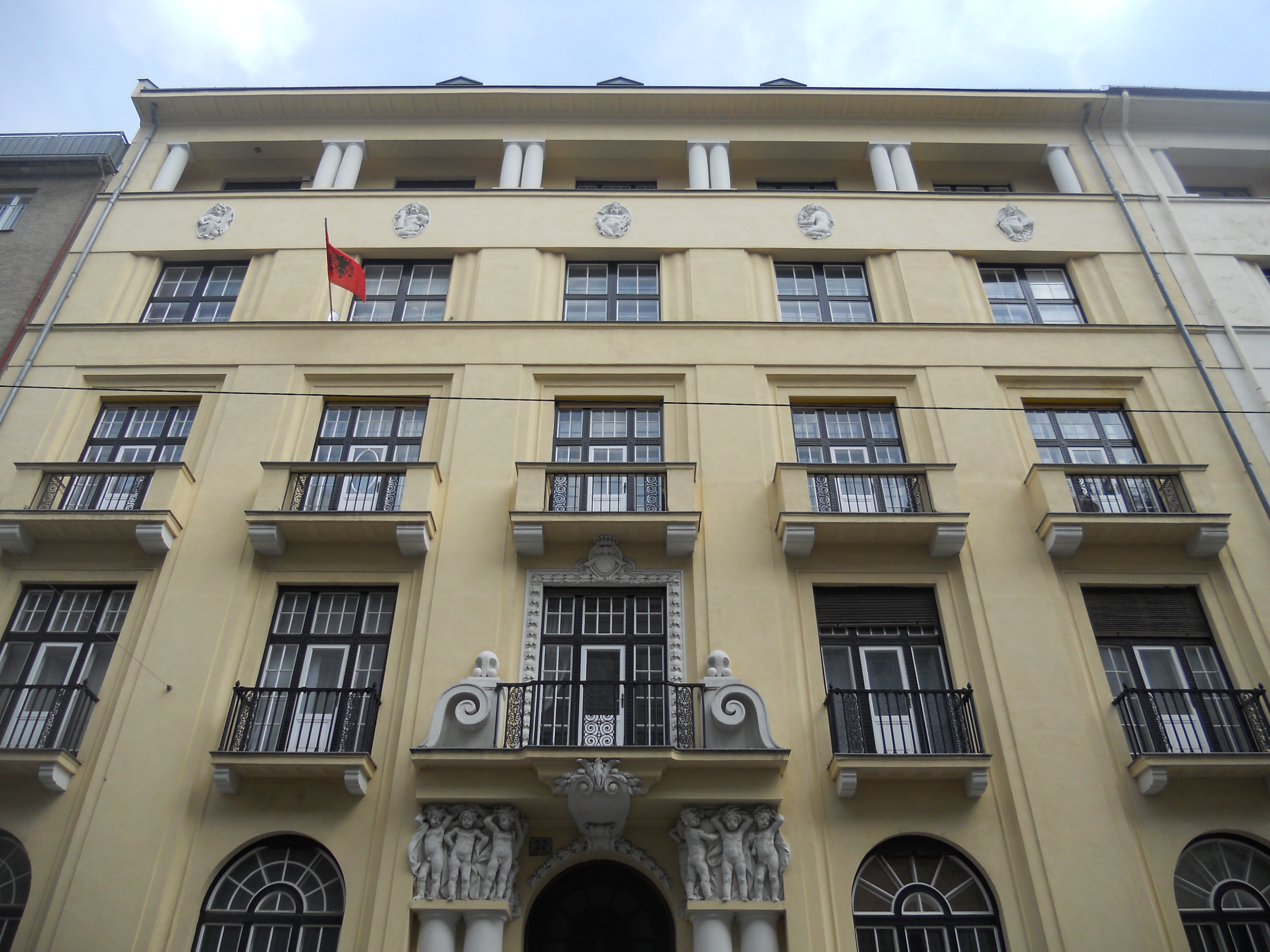
Embassy of Albania in Vienna

The federal government of the Republic of Austria recognised Albania as a sovereign and independent state on February 18, 1922. A passport office had been opened in Vienna on April of the previous year by Gjergj Pekmezi who was to become the first consul representative of Albania to Austria.

After the war, the two countries re-established diplomatic ties on December 20, 1955. They exchanged representatives the following year, with Walter Wodak presenting his credentials on behalf of the Austrian government on June 13, 1956, followed by Koço Prifti who presented his credentials for the Albanian side on October 10.

== List of diplomatic representatives of Albania to Austria (1922–present) ==
No.	Name	Title	From	To
1	Gjergj Pekmezi	Consul	1922	1924
2	Nush Bushati	Consul	1924	1925
3	Çatin Saraçi	Consul	1925	1930
4	Kol Rrota	Consul	1933	1939
5	Koço Prifti	Ambassador	1956	1960
6	Siri Çarçani	Ambassador	1960	1961
7	Mehmet Çaka	Chargé d'affaires	1961	1962
8	Gaqo Nesho	Ambassador	1962	1966
9	Murat Angoni	Ambassador	1966	1969
10	Dhimitër Tona	Ambassador	1969	1973
11	Sokrat Plaka	Ambassador	1973	1976
12	Zihni Haskaj	Ambassador	1976	1979
13	Musin Kroi	Ambassador	1979	1983
14	Idriz Bardhi	Ambassador	1983	1988
15	Engjëll Koloneci	Ambassador	1988	1992
16	Albert Aliçka	Ambassador	1992	
17	Shpresa Kureta	Ambassador	2002	2005
18	Valter Ibrahimi	Ambassador	2006	2009
19	Egin Ceka	Chargé d'affaires	2009	2010
20	Vili Minarolli	Ambassador	2010	2014
21	Roland Bimo	Ambassador	2014	Present
