= List of ambassadors of Albania to Bulgaria =

== List of representatives ==
Name	Period	Resident/Non resident	Title	Notes	Presented credentials	Ref
Konstadin Boshnak	1922–1925	Non-resident	Charge d'Affaires ad interim	Resident in Istambul	25 October 1922	
Ali Aslani	1925–1926	Non-resident	Charge d'Affaires ad interim	Resident in Ankara	6 June 1925	
Rauf Fico	1926–1928	Resident	Envoy Extraordinary and Minister Plenipotentiary	Resident in Sofia	20 September 1926	
Ali Aslani	1928–1930	Resident	Charge d'Affaires ad interim	Resident in Sofia	18 July 1928	
Kemal Mesare	1930–1931	Resident	Envoy Extraordinary and Minister Plenipotentiary	Resident in Sofia	3 May 1930	
Nezir Leskoviku	1931–1932	Resident	Charge d'Affaires ad interim	Resident in Sofia	17 November 1931	
Fuad Aslani	1932	Resident	Charge d'Affaires ad interim	Resident in Sofia	22 January 1932	
Dhimitër Popa	1932–1933	Resident	Envoy Extraordinary and Minister Plenipotentiary	Resident in Sofia	11 March 1932	
Tefik Shula	1933–1934	Resident	Charge d'Affaires ad interim	Resident in Sofia	1933	
Skender Konica	1934–1935	Resident	Charge d'Affaires ad interim	Resident in Sofia	1934	
M. Hulusi	1935–1936	Resident	Charge d'Affaires ad interim	Resident in Sofia	1935	
Xhemil Dino	1936–1939	Resident	Envoy Extraordinary and Minister Plenipotentiary	Resident in Sofia	17 October 1936	
Teodor Heba	1946–1948	Resident	Charge d'Affaires ad interim	Resident in Sofia	1946	
Teodor Heba	1948–1949	Resident	Envoy Extraordinary and Minister Plenipotentiary	Resident in Sofia	28 January 1948	
Vasili Konomi	1949–1952	Resident	Charge d'Affaires ad interim	Resident in Sofia	29 January 1949	
Nesti Nase	1952–1953	Resident	Charge d'Affaires ad interim	Resident in Sofia	20 June 1952	
Vasil Natanaili	1953–1954	Resident	Charge d'Affaires ad interim	Resident in Sofia	5 November 1953	
Koço Tashko	1954–1955	Resident	Ambassador	Resident in Sofia	21 May 1954	
Shemsi Totozani	1955–1957	Resident	Ambassador	Resident in Sofia	26 June 1955	
Petro Papi	1957–1960	Resident	Ambassador	Resident in Sofia	16 October 1957	
Pirro Koçi	1960–1964	Resident	Ambassador	Resident in Sofia	6 September 1960	
Delo Balili	1964–1970	Resident	Ambassador	Resident in Sofia	23 October 1964	
Niko Dodbiba	1970–1977	Resident	Charge d'Affaires ad interim	Resident in Sofia	October 1970	
Mislim Sinoimeri	1977–1983	Resident	Charge d'Affaires ad interim	Resident in Sofia	1977	
Shakvir Vukaj	1983–1988	Resident	Charge d'Affaires ad interim	Resident in Sofia	1983	
Bashkim Rama	1988–1992	Resident	Ambassador	Resident in Sofia	5 September 1988	
Koço Kote	1992–1995	Resident	Ambassador	Resident in Sofia	15 October 1992	
Xhelal Tahiri	1995–1997	Resident	Ambassador	Resident in Sofia	20 June 1995	
Avni Xhelili	1997–2002	Resident	Ambassador	Resident in Sofia	6 November 1997	
Fatmir Kumbaro	2002–2006	Resident	Ambassador	Resident in Sofia	13 May 2002	
Bujar Skëndo	2006–2011	Resident	Ambassador	Resident in Sofia	2006	
Petrit Karabina	2011–2014	Resident	Ambassador	Resident in Sofia	27 January 2011	
Qirjako Kureta	2014–2018	Resident	Ambassador	Resident in Sofia	27 November 2014	
Donika Hoxha	2018–2024	Resident	Ambassador	Resident in Sofia	28 November 2018	
Inid Milo	2024–Present	Resident	Ambassador	Resident in Sofia	31 January 2024	
