= List of ambassadors of Albania to Serbia =

Albania opened is Legation in Belgrade in September 1922 with charge d'affaires Andrea Katundi. He would remain in charge of the Albanian diplomatic service in Belgrade until the arrival of the Albanian minister plenipotentiary, Ali Riza Kolonja. Diplomatic relations were broken off on April 7, 1939 due to Italy's annexation of Albania and the missions were closed. Albanian Legation were reopened on July 21st, 1945, but on 28 May 1950, Yugoslavia shut down its embassy in Tirana, and on 11 October of that year ceased diplomatic relations with Albania. Diplomatic ties were resumed on 22 December 1953. On 5 February 1971,the Yugoslav and Albanian Government have agreed to raise their diplomatic mission to embassy level and to exchange ambassadors.Diplomatic relations relations were broke off again due to the conflict in Kosovo from April 18, 1999 to January 17, 2001.

List of Heads of Mission of Albania to Serbia:

Name	Period	Title	Presented credentials	Ref
Andrea Katundi	1922–1923	Charge d'Affaires ad interim	September 1922	
Ali-Riza Kolonja	1923–1925	Envoy Extraordinary and Minister Plenipotentiary	7 February 1923	
Stavro Stavri	1925	Envoy Extraordinary and Minister Plenipotentiary	1925	
Xhavid Leskoviku	1925–1926	Envoy Extraordinary and Minister Plenipotentiary	1925	
Ceno Kryeziu	1926–1927	Envoy Extraordinary and Minister Plenipotentiary	1926	
Tahir Shtylla	1927–1928	Envoy Extraordinary and Minister Plenipotentiary	1927	
Rauf Fico	1928–1929	Envoy Extraordinary and Minister Plenipotentiary	27 November 1928	
Xhaferr Vila	1929–1932	Envoy Extraordinary and Minister Plenipotentiary	1929	
Rauf Fico	1932–1937	Envoy Extraordinary and Minister Plenipotentiary	9 April 1932	
Tahir Shtylla	1937–1939	Envoy Extraordinary and Minister Plenipotentiary	November 1937	
Hysni Kapo	1945–1947	Envoy Extraordinary and Minister Plenipotentiary	21 July 1945	
Tuk Jakova	1947	Envoy Extraordinary and Minister Plenipotentiary	8 March 1947	
Ramadan Çitaku	1948	Envoy Extraordinary and Minister Plenipotentiary	23 February 1948	
Bato Karafili	1954–1956	Charge d'Affaires ad interim	29 June 1954	
Mislim Sinoimeri	1956–1959	Charge d'Affaires ad interim	26 July 1956	
Tahmaz Beqari	1960–1965	Charge d'Affaires ad interim	15 January 1960	
Andrea Shkodrani	1965–1969	Charge d'Affaires ad interim	29 June 1965	
Lik Seiti	1969–1971	Charge d'Affaires ad interim	November 1969	
Dimiter Lamani	1971–1975	Ambassador	2 September 1971	
Sokrat Plaka	1975–1982	Ambassador	September 1975	
Lik Seiti	1982–1986	Ambassador	September 1982	
Kujtim Hysenaj	1986–1992	Ambassador	November 1986	
Vili Minarolli	1993–1995	Charge d'Affaires ad interim	1993	
Florian Nova	1997–1999	Charge d'Affaires ad interim	November 1997	
Petraq Pojani	2001	Charge d'Affaires ad interim	August 2001	
Edmond Haxhinasto	2001–2002	Charge d'Affaires ad interim	November 2001	
Petrit Bushati	2002–2006	Ambassador	2002	
Spiro Koçi	2007–2008	Ambassador	2007	
Shpëtim Çaushi	2010–2013	Ambassador	30 January 2010	
Ernal Filo	2013–2014	Charge d'Affaires ad interim	2013	
Ilir Boçka	2014–2023	Ambassador	4 September 2014	
Bardhyl Canaj	2024–Present	Ambassador	2 February 2024	
