= List of ambassadors of Albania to Sweden =

Albanian Embassy in Stockholm was opened on 29 May 1972 with accreditation first Resident Ambassador Sami Baholli.

List of Heads of Mission of Albania to Sweden:

Name	Period	Title	Presented credentials	Ref
Sami Baholli	1972–1973	Ambassador	29 May 1972	
Bashkim Dino	1973–1979	Ambassador	24 October 1973	
Dhimiter Lamani	1979–1982	Ambassador	26 April 1979	
Izedin Hajdini	1982–1986	Ambassador	30 September 1982	
Shpetim Caushi	1986–1988	Ambassador	10 June 1986	
Petrit Bushati	1988–1991	Ambassador	5 May 1988	
Afrim Karagjozi	1992	Ambassador	6 February 1992	
Bardhyl Hamit Kokalari	1992–1994	Ambassador	2 October 1992	
Idriz Elmaz Konjari	1994–1998	Ambassador	7 October 1994	
Shahin Kadare	1998–2002	Ambassador	17 September 1998	
Shaban Murati	2002–2007	Ambassador	14 November 2002	
Ruhi Hado	2007–2013	Ambassador	26 September 2007	
Ilir Abdiu	2014–2018	Ambassador	18 November 2014	
Virgjil Kule	2018–2024	Ambassador	24 October 2018	
Albana Dautllari	2024–Present	Ambassador	21 March 2024	
