= List of ambassadors of Albania to Cuba =

Albanian Embassy in Havana was opened on 21 December 1961 with accreditation first Resident Ambassador Josif Pogaçe. As soon as the regime changed in Albania and Berisha's government came to power, the embassy was closed in April 1992.

List of Heads of Mission of Albania to Cuba:

| Name | Period | Title | Presented credentials | Ref |
|---|---|---|---|---|
| Josif Pogaçe | 1961–1966 | Ambassador | 21 December 1961 | |
| Labo Abazi | 1966–1970 | Chargé d'Affaires a.i. | 1966 | |
| Skender Cuci | 1970–1972 | Chargé d'Affaires a.i. | 1970 | |
| Niko Misha | 1972–1973 | Chargé d'Affaires a.i. | 1972 | |
| Gac Mazi | 1973–1975 | Chargé d'Affaires a.i. | December 1973 | |
| Naum Gegprifti | 1975–1978 | Chargé d'Affaires a.i. | November 1975 | |
| Pertef Hasamataj | 1978–1985 | Chargé d'Affaires a.i. | December 1978 | |
| Gëzim Arapi | 1985–1988 | Ambassador | 18 October 1985 | |
| Çlirim Çepani | 1988–1992 | Ambassador | 24 October 1988 | |
