= List of ambassadors of Albania to Italy =

The Principality of Albania established diplomatic relations with the Kingdom of Italy in 1914 when Prince Wied delegated his envoy, Myfid Bey Libohova as its foreign affairs representative. Diplomatic ties between the two countries were put on pause following the Italian occupation of Sazan and Vlorë later that year and remained so until August 1920. Relations between the two countries resumed with Albania opening its first legation in Rome that resulted in the creation of several consulates that later expanded with the arrival to power of King Zog. During this period, Italian influence in the country grew steadily and was reinforced with the signing of the second Pact of Tirana on November 27, 1926 which gave Italy considerable economic and military influence as a way to stave off Yugoslav expansion. On March 19, 1936, the two countries signed new economic and financial agreements, as well as a secret military protocol that gave fascist Italy even more control over Albania. It was only a matter of time before Albania became part of Benito Mussolini’s plan of a new Roman empire. On April 7, 1939, Italian troops finally invaded the country and swiftly took control.

As a result of this occupation, political relations between the two countries were nonexistent. Italian troops were removed from the country in 1943 with the arrival of German Nazi forces who established a new puppet government.

After the war, Albania and Italy signed a peace treaty which went into effect on September 15, 1947. In May 1949, diplomatic relations were restored on a legal basis, following repeated requests from the Italian side. On February 2, 1954, the Ambassador Extraordinary and Plenipotentiary of the Italian Republic to Tirana presented his credentials. In the early years after the war, Italian governments in their policy towards Albania condemned the fascist aggression of April 7, 1939, attributing it to fascism and considering it as a dark chapter in their history. After the departure of Albania from the Warsaw Pact in 1968, initiatives were taken by Italy to further its ties with the Albanian government. Relations between the two countries saw some signs of improvement in the 1980s. At this time, there were exchanges of various delegations, visits by government members and an increase in the volume of trade and cultural exchanges.

After the fall of communism, Italy began to emerge as a strategic partner, assisting and contributing to institutional and economic reforms and the consolidation of the rule of law. Today, Italy is Albania's largest trade partner.

== List of diplomatic representatives of Albania to Italy (1914–present) ==
Diplomatic representatives of Albania to Italy (1914–present)
No.	Name	Title	Term start	Term end
1	Myfid Libohova	Ambassador	1914	1914
2	Tefik Mborja	Ambassador	1923	1925
3	Ekrem Libohova	Ambassador	1925	1926
4	Xhemil Dino	Ambassador	1926	1931
5	Xhaferr Vila	Ambassador	1936	1938
6	Zenel Hamiti	Ambassador	1949	1952
7	Behar Shtylla	Ambassador	1952	1954
8	Edip Çuçi	Ambassador	1954	1958
9	Koço Prifti	Ambassador	1958	1961
10	Jordan Pani	Ambassador	1961	1967
11	Ksenofon Nushi	Ambassador	1967	1972
12	Pirro Koçi	Ambassador	1972	1977
13	Kujtim Myzyri	Ambassador	1977	1980
14	Pirro Bita	Ambassador	1980	1982
15	Bashkim Dino	Ambassador	1982	1988
16	Dashnor Dervishi	Ambassador	1988	1992
17	Edmond Dule	Ambassador	1992	1995
18	Pandeli Pasko	Ambassador	1995	1998
19	Leontiev Çuçi	Ambassador	1998	2001
20	Pëllumb Xhufi	Ambassador	2001	2004
21	Pavli Zëri	Ambassador	2004	2006
22	Llesh Kola	Ambassador	2006	2013
23	Neritan Ceka	Ambassador	2013	2016
24	Anila Bitri	Ambassador	2016	Present
