= 4th Infantry Regiment "Hoch- und Deutschmeister" =

Historical Austrian regiment

- Infanterieregiment „Hoch- und Deutschmeister" Nr. 4
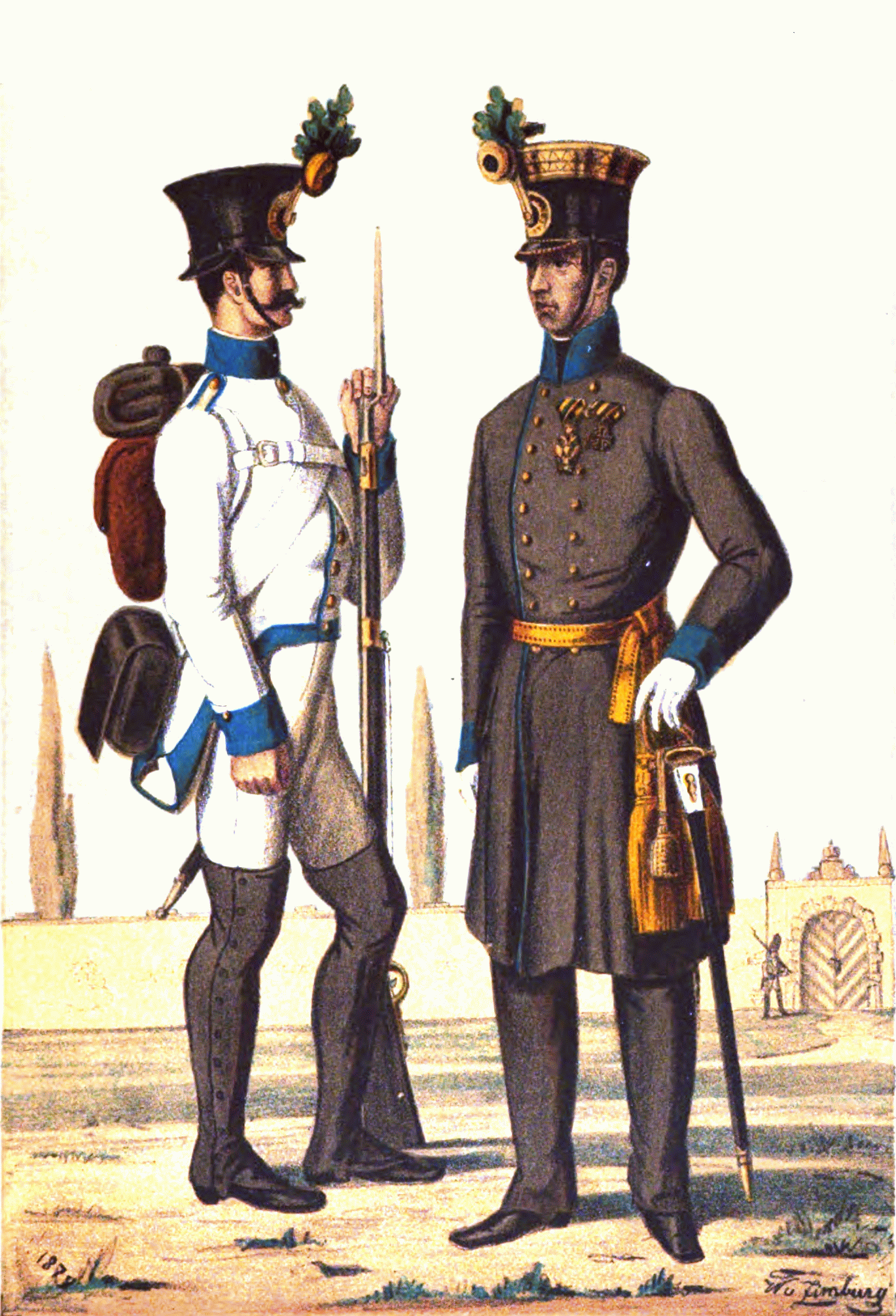
- From top to bottom: Gemeiner (Left) and Officer (Right) (1809–1835), Both Leibfahnen of the regiment (1806) (see also: Image Media)
- Active: 1696–1918
- Country: Holy Roman Empire (1696–1804); Austrian Empire (1804–1867); Austria-Hungary (1867–1918)
- Branch: Army of the Holy Roman Empire (1696–1804); Imperial Austrian Army (1804–1867); Austro-Hungarian Army (1867–1918)
- Type: Infantry
- Patron: Hochmeister and Deutschmeister
- Mottos: "Deutschmeister ist und bleibt man!" (Deutschmeister is and remains one!)
- Colors: Sky Blue Facings Gold Buttons
- March: Deutschmeister-Regimentsmarsch Piano Version
- Anniversaries: 18th June 1757; Battle of Kolín
- Engagements: Great Turkish War; Rákóczi's War of Independence; Austro-Turkish War (1716–1718); War of the Polish Succession; War of the Austrian Succession; Seven Years' War; Austro-Turkish War (1788–1791); French Revolutionary and Napoleonic Wars; Hungarian Revolution of 1848; First Italian War of Independence; Austro-Prussian War; World War I

The 4th Infantry Regiment "Hoch- und Deutschmeister" (German: Infanterieregiment "Hoch- und Deutschmeister" Nr. 4; IR 4) was an infantry regiment of the Habsburg monarchy from 1696 until the end of the Habsburg Monarchy in 1918. It was one of the most prestigious and historically significant regiments in the Army of the Holy Roman Empire and subsequently Imperial-Royal (later Imperial and Royal) Army, serving in conflicts from the Great Turkish War up until World War I.

Chiefly known for its popular military band and its Deutschmeister-Regimentsmarsch, the regiment's tradition was adopted at first by the First Austrian Republic's Bundesheer, then by the Wehrmacht's 44th Infantry Division in 1943 and today is maintained by the Vienna 1st Jäger Battalion "Hoch- und Deutschmeister". Its honorary title "Hoch- und Deutschmeister" derives from its association with the Grand Master (Hochmeister) of the Teutonic Order, who served as its regimental proprietor (Inhaber).

The regiment was originally known as Pfalz-Neuburg-Teutschmeister zu Fuß after its formation in 1696. It received the numerical designation No. 4 in 1769, and adopted the official regimental title "Hoch- und Deutschmeister" in 1814. The regiment later dropped this title in 1915.

== Background ==
The Habsburg Monarchy, often finding itself at war with enemies, especially with France and the Ottoman Empire, had to rely on other electoral princes of the Holy Roman Empire to make up for its manpower shortages and establish regiments. In early 1695, the regiment's structure and plan were finalised, and it was established soon after. The regiment, with about 2,000 men, was established on January 21 1696, by an agreement between Emperor Leopold I and the Grand Master of the Teutonic Order, Francis Louis of Palatinate-Neuburg.

It was initially named Pfalz-Neuburg-Teutschmeister zu Fuß (Pfalz-Neuburg-Teutschmeister on Foot) after its patron, but soon became known simply as "Teutschmeister" (later Deutschmeister). The regiment was recruited in the Bailiwick of the Teutonic Order in Franconia and then assembled and mustered in Donauwörth, before being accepted into imperial service on June 3, 1696.

The regiment's success largely stemmed from massive funding by its first regimental proprietor, Francis Louis of Palatinate-Neuburg. As a result, it became a well-equipped and disciplined unit within the Habsburg army.

Early recruits were drawn mostly from the southern and northwestern areas of the Holy Roman Empire, including Franconia, Rhineland-Westphalia and Lower Saxony. This would change later on, eventually transforming the unit into a Lower Austrian regiment with a strong Viennese identity.

== Early Ottoman-Habsburg wars ==
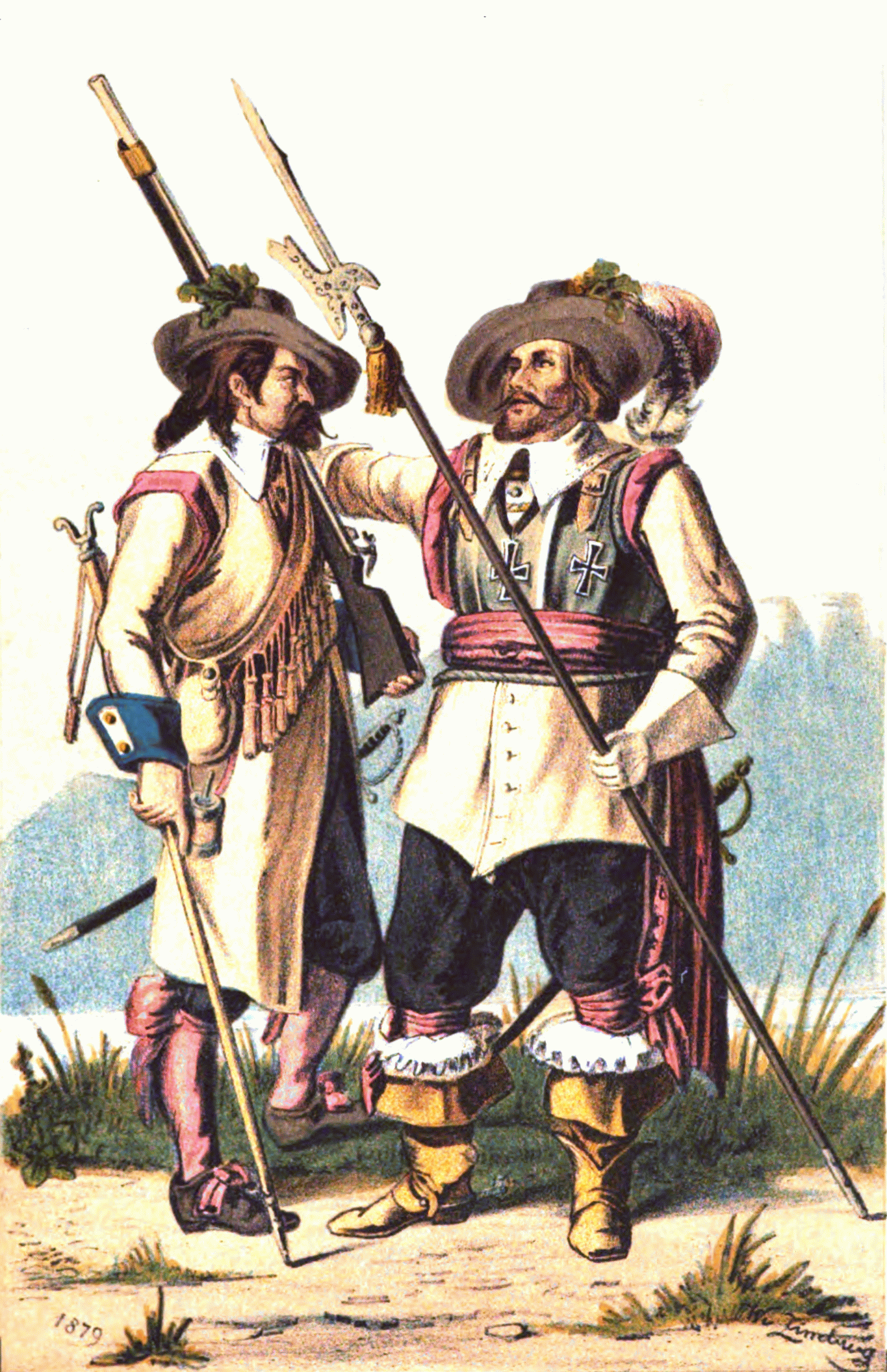
Musketeer (Left) and Hauptmann (Right) in 1696. The Hauptmann wears Teutonic crosses on his uniform.

=== Great Turkish War ===
Later in June 1696, the regiment was shipped down the Danube from Donauwörth to Hungary, eventually reaching Transylvania. On the way, it was repeatedly ambushed by Ottoman cavalry. During one such ambush on 6 September 1697, it distinguished itself for the first time when the Leib-Bataillon, the regiment's elite battalion, on the Szegedi Heath along the Tisza rapidly formed square and fired into the charging Ottoman cavalry, forcing the attackers to retreat.

The regiment continued its advance along the Tisza through swampy terrain and steppes around Petrovaradin, where it received reports that Ottoman forces had crossed the river near Zenta (now Senta), north of the town. A Pasha that was captured by the vanguard informed them that the Sultan was advancing across a strongly fortified pontoon bridge with his entire army, and that this crossing point was to be attacked. At sunset, the regiment marched in combat readiness toward Senta to meet the enemy, its mission, together with other infantry units, being to storm the well-fortified enemy line of entrenchments.

The regiment soon saw its baptism of fire at the Battle of Zenta on 11 September 1697 under the leadership of Prince Eugene of Savoy, where it drove back Ottoman forces from their positions and then attacked the enemy from the rear, preventing their retreat across the bridge and forcing them into the waters of the Tisza, resulting in the Ottoman army being completely annihilated.

It distinguished itself so highly in this battle that upon receiving Prince Eugene's report of victory, Emperor Leopold I issued a letter of thanks and recognition to the regiment's commander at the time, Damian Hugo, Baron of Viermund to Neersen.

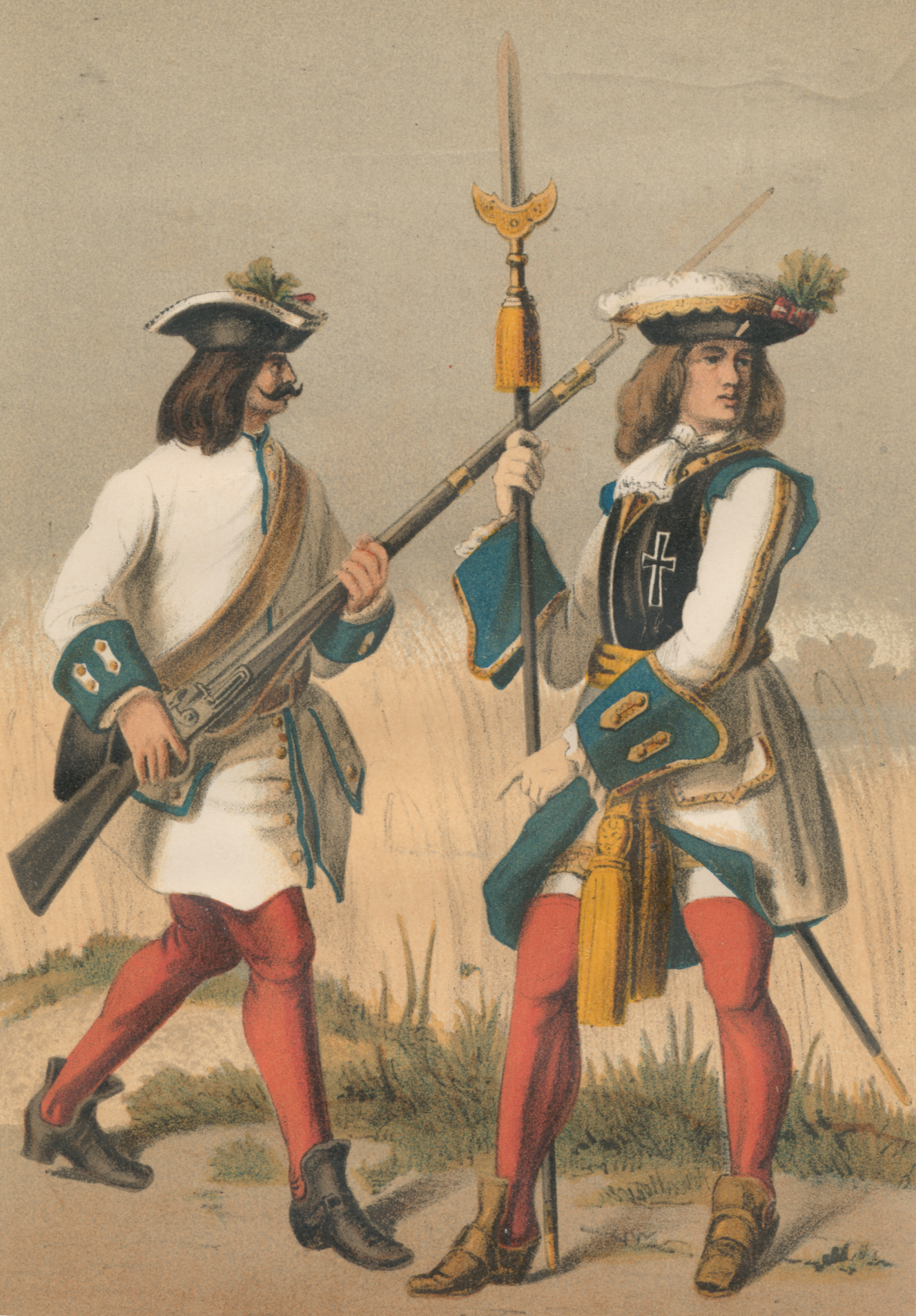
Musketeer and Oberstwachtmeister (1710)

The regiment remained in garrison in Hungary and Transylvania until 1711, where it took part in Rákóczi's War of Independence, fighting in the battles of Smolenice, Koroncó, and Trenčín, as well as in the sieges of the Castle of Arva (now Orava) and Érsekújvár (now Nové Zámky). During this period, it was considered one of the most motivated and best-equipped units, partly due to substantial wartime funding. It was later sent on garrison duty across all places within the Holy Roman Empire, even as far as the Spanish Netherlands (later the Austrian Netherlands, now Belgium).

=== Austro-Turkish War (1716–1718) ===
The unit fought in the Battle of Petrovaradin, a major engagement that ultimately opened the way to Belgrade after the victory. It then took part in the subsequent Siege of Belgrade (1717), where it helped capture the city. The regiment's commander, Damian Casimir of Dalberg, was killed during the siege.

The following year, the Treaty of Passarowitz was signed, concluding the war in a Habsburg victory.

== War of the Polish Succession ==
After serving on garrison duty in the Austrian Netherlands for 16 years, the regiment was ordered in December 1731 to cross the Rhine back into Habsburg lands. It reached Silesia and Moravia in March 1732, where it was stationed to guard against a potential invasion by the other great powers of the conflict or a possible Prussian entry into the war.

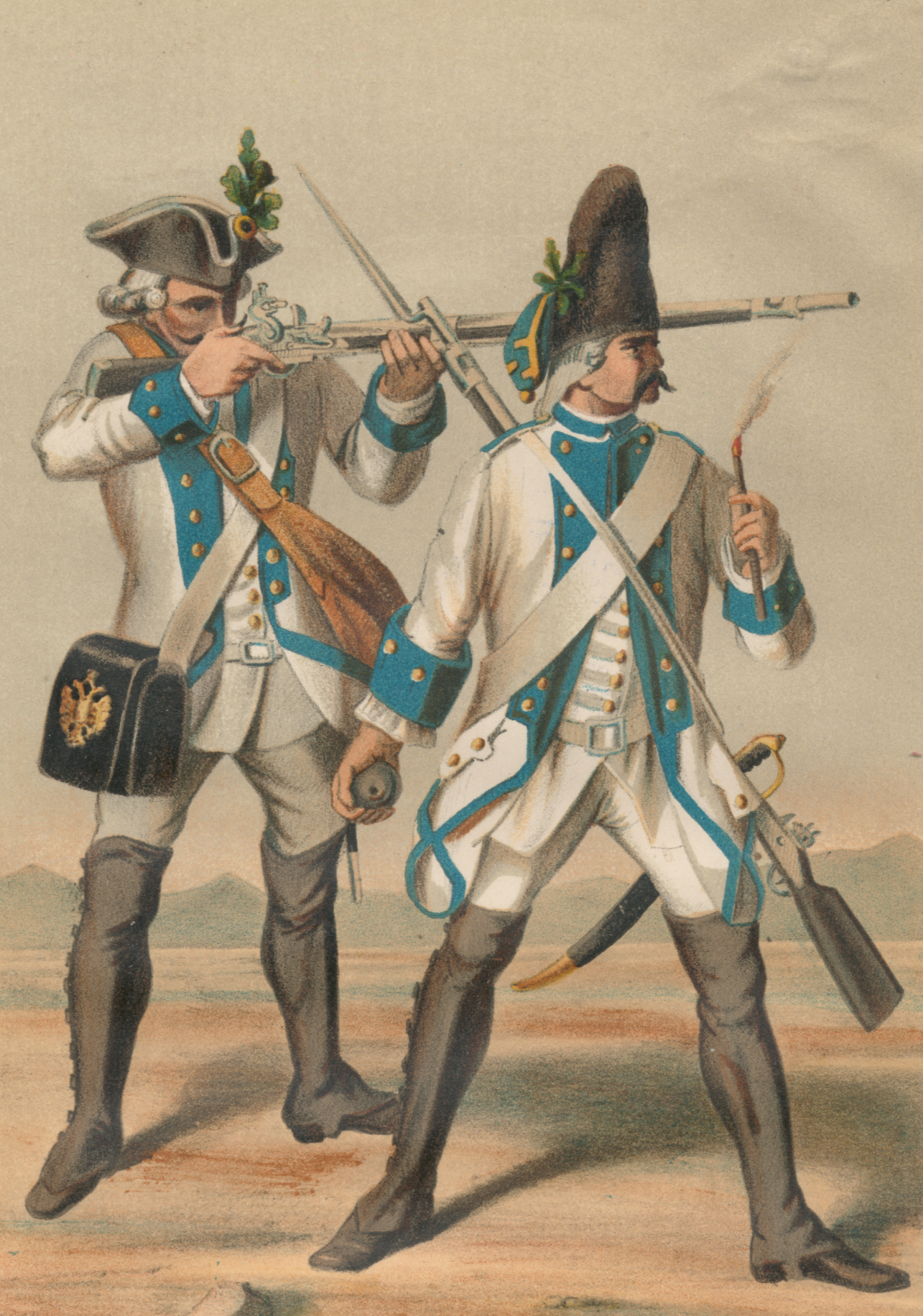
Musketeer and Grenadier (1730)

It later marched from Wrocław across the Oder through Bohemia and Bavaria, before reaching the Württemberg city of Ettlingen, south of Karlsruhe, where it remained for a year, engaging in minor skirmishes against French forces. In February 1734, the regiment moved into northern Italy and was stationed at Mori before advancing to Mantua. Facing superior Franco-Spanish and Sardinian forces, it was forced to retreat and soon withdrew across the Po river.

The regiment soon fought in the Battle of Parma, where they took part in an assault on an entrenched Franco-Sardinian position and were ultimately repulsed after suffering heavy casualties.

On 15 September, in the early morning, the regiment played a major role in the Raid on Quistello. Advancing in six columns along the Secchia river, the first column, to which the Deutschmeister belonged, failed to find a ford and was forced to wade across in chest-deep water. Despite this, they were the first to reach the French camp and commence the raid.

During the storming of the camp, the Deutschmeister advanced so rapidly that the enemy was unable to sound the alarm, allowing the French Marshal François de Broglie to escape only narrowly in his nightshirt, while many of his staff were captured. The soldiers also took numerous French regimental standards and valuable possessions, including most of the horses.

After the encounter, the combined Franco-Sardinian forces fell back to Guastalla, where the Deutschmeister took part in the Battle of Guastalla on 19 September. After running low on ammunition, the Austrian forces were ordered to withdraw to Luzzara, ending the battle in defeat.

== War of the Austrian Succession ==
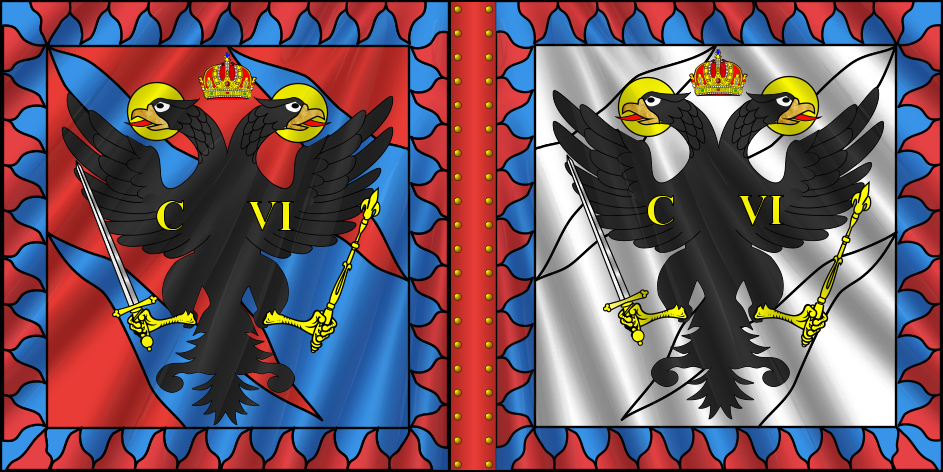
The Ordinar and Leibfahne used by the Deutschmeisters ~1740 during the War of the Austrian Succession

At the start of the war, the regiment was stationed in Pavia, Duchy of Milan, and later moved into Emilia-Romagna, where it then proceeded with its advance until it encountered French, Spanish and Genoese forces in multiple engagements. It exclusively fought in the Italian campaigns of the conflict.

The regiment soon advanced south toward the Italian Adriatic coast at Rimini, then further to Ancona, before moving inland toward Macerata and Foligno, with Spoleto serving as a route towards Bourbon Naples. However, plans to capture Naples were never realised, as Empress Maria Theresa recalled the regiment for service on the northern Italian front, effectively ending the Neapolitan campaign.

While the Battle of Campo Santo proved inconclusive, the regiment proved itself again when a Deutschmeister battalion bayonet charged the Spanish lines and held out until reinforcements arrived. In this battle, the regiment first became associated with military music, advancing toward the enemy lines accompanied by Turkish-style march music and the cheering of soldiers.

The Battle of Rottofreddo ended in victory despite heavy losses. During the battle, the regiment stormed Franco-Spanish positions three times, forcing multiple enemy units to retreat, though it recorded the third-highest rate of desertion among the units engaged and had to temporarily retreat three times to recover from its losses.

In the last year of the conflict, the regiment took part in the Siege of Genoa as part of the Siege Corps, helping to halt several Genoese advances. At Rivarolo, north of Genoa, the Deutschmeistergrenadiers showed exceptional steadfastness, repelling repeated Genoese attacks before launching a surprise counterattack that forced the enemy to retreat into the surrounding mountains. Shortly afterwards, another unit drove them from these positions as well. After this siege, most fronts stagnated until the Treaty of Aix-la-Chapelle ended the war.

During the long retreat to the right bank of the Po River, the Deutschmeister acted as the vanguard until they reached Argentera, where they fought off enemy forces before continuing the withdrawal into Lombardy.

After the war on July 4, 1749, the regiment had the honour of drilling in the presence of Empress Maria Theresa and received special praise.

== Seven Years' War ==
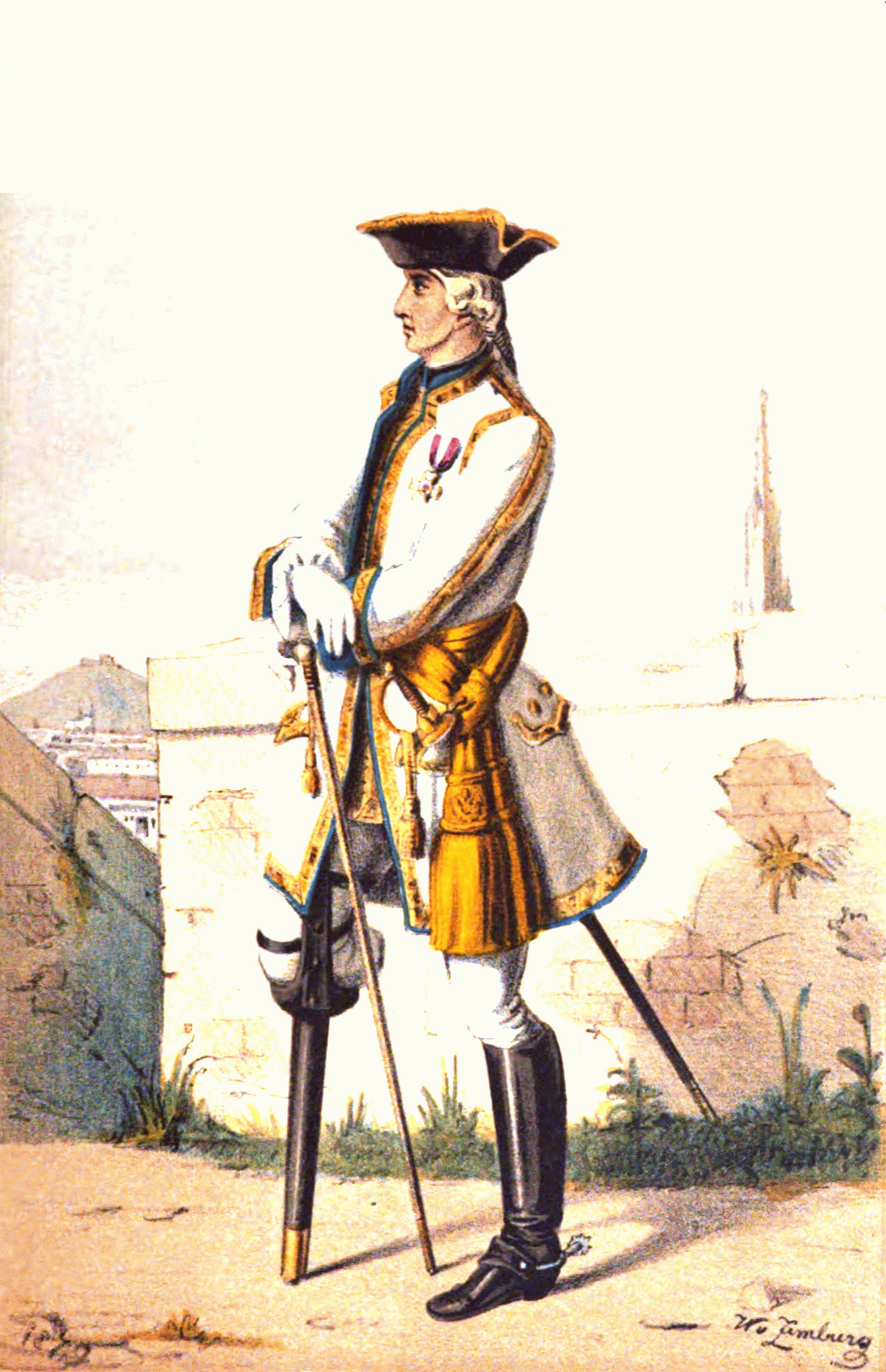
Oberstwachtmeister Johann von Soro at Kolín (1757)

=== 1750–1757 ===
As of 1750, the regiment counted four battalions (two grenadier companies and 16 fusilier companies) for a total of 2,300 men. This was the regiment's administrative organisation. However, the tactical organisation differed: two field fusilier battalions, each of six companies; two grenadier companies (usually converged with grenadiers from other regiments into an ad hoc unit); and one garrison battalion of four companies.

At the outbreak of the war in 1756, the regiment was stationed in Buda (now Budapest) before being redeployed to northern Moravia on the Silesian border, where it joined Ottavio Piccolomini's corps assembling at Hradec Králové toward the end of the year against Prussia.

=== 1757–1758 ===
On 18 June 1757, the regiment distinguished itself at the Battle of Kolín, where it was deployed on the left of the second line in Generalmajor Baron Plonquet's Brigade. Together with the Baden-Baden and Botta Infantry Regiments, it helped repulse the initial Prussian attack near Bříství. Oberstwachtmeister Johann von Soro, commanding a battalion of converged grenadiers, repeatedly led counterattacks despite being wounded by a musket shot to the leg, continuing to command for two hours until he finally fainted. He was carried to the field hospital, but when he learned the situation was deteriorating, he returned to the front and led a renewed bayonet charge. In the ensuing fighting, Soro was again severely wounded when a cannonball shattered his right leg.

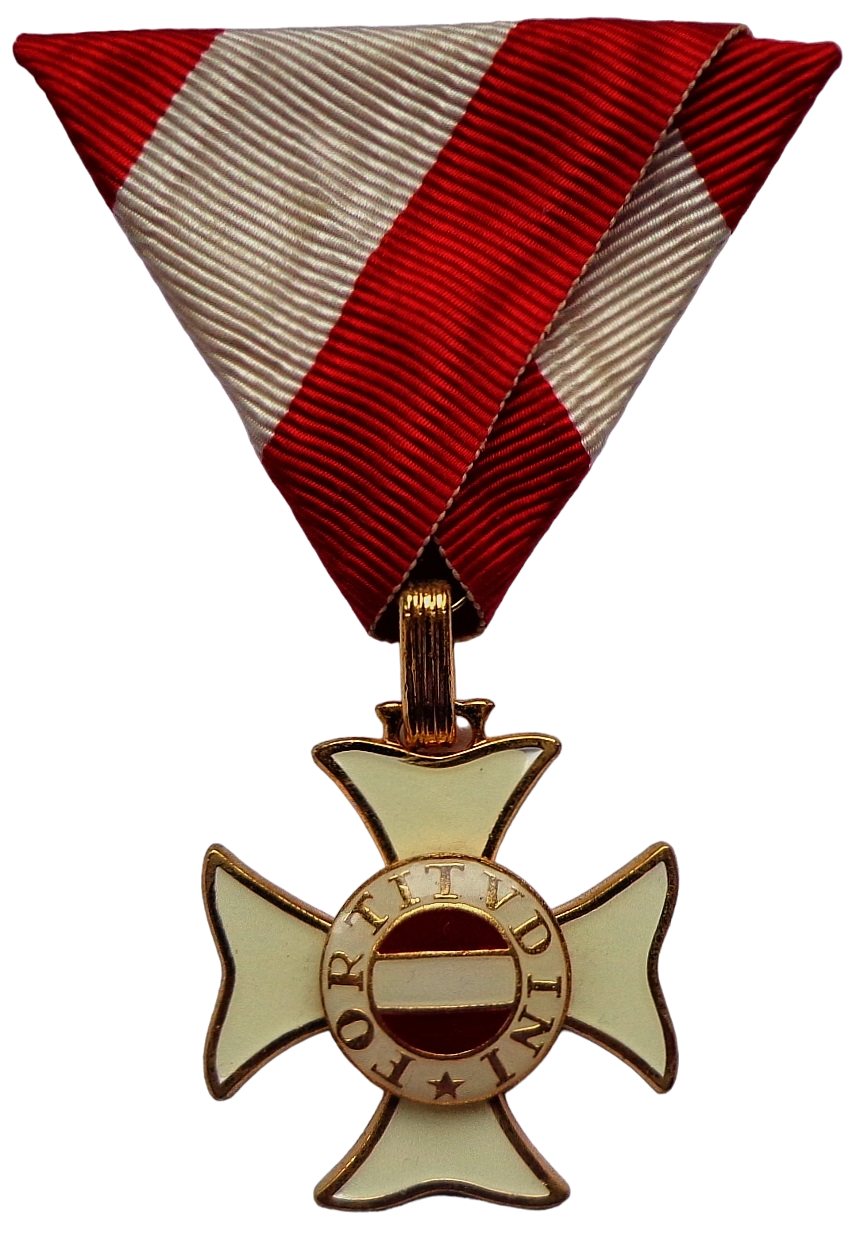
Military Order of Maria Theresa

The regiment suffered very heavy losses, including several staff officers and most of its grenadier leadership, leaving it reduced to a single battalion and one grenadier company. In recognition of its conduct, Empress Maria Theresa awarded the regiment 6,203 guilders, and all wounded soldiers were granted double pay.

Despite being a costly victory, the battle forced Frederick the Great to abandon the Siege of Prague and his planned advance on Vienna, and instead retreat into Saxony. Following the battle, Maria Theresa founded the Military Order of Maria Theresa. The battle date later became the regiment's anniversary.

On 15 July, during the Prussian retreat toward Saxony, the regiment formed part of Field marshal Macquire's corps and took part in the storming of Gabel at Jablonné v Podještědí. Its grenadiers attacked one of the gates but were driven back. After an Austrian victory, the regiment moved to Zittau, where it participated in the subsequent siege. After the battle, the regiment was split up to be stationed in Wrocław and Brno.

Throughout the rest of the year, small Battalions of the regiment were involved in the Siege of Schweidnitz (now Świdnica) and the Battle of Breslau (now Wrocław). There, one battalion was assigned to Josip Šišković's brigade in the second line of the infantry centre under Feldzeugmeister Baron Kheul, while its grenadiers were attached to Salomon Sprecher von Bernegg's corps. The grenadiers took part in the storming of the village of Grabiszyn, west of Wrocław, capturing it after four assaults from the Prussians, while other elements of the regiment fought near Pieszyce and helped storm two entrenchments, capturing nine cannons, one howitzer and one mortar.

The regiment suffered losses of 37 men killed and 125 wounded, including eight officers. During the battle, it was temporarily commanded by Oberstwachtmeister Baron Haack, who replaced the sick Colonel Franz von Callenberg.

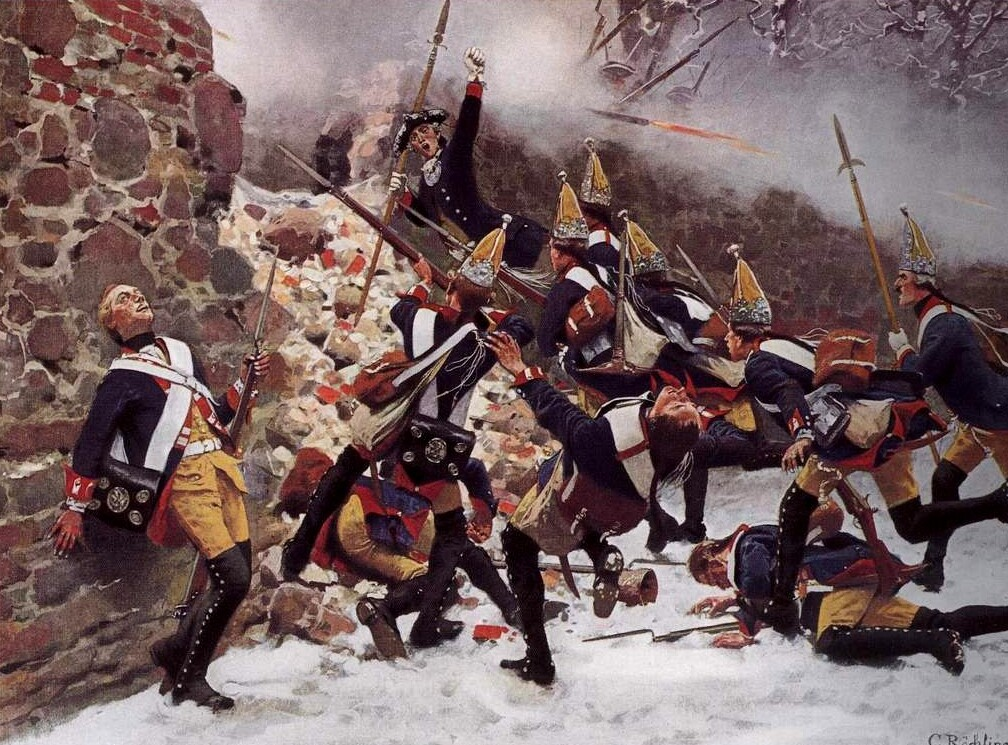
Storming of the breach in the city wall by Prussian grenadiers at the Battle of Leuthen

Later, at the Battle of Leuthen, northwest of Wrocław, in Prussian (formerly Austrian) Silesia, it defended the bridge near Leszno before ultimately being defeated by Prussian forces. The defeat ensured Prussian control of the region during the Third Silesian War, which was part of the Seven Years' War.

After the defeat at Leuthen, Field marshal Leopold Joseph von Daun concentrated the army's remnants around Wrocław, then marched through Schweidnitz (now Świdnica) and Landshut into Bohemia. On December 18, his troops passed the border. During the retreat, the regiment had lost all of its baggage. On the way, 300 men under Captain Horle had been left in Schweidnitz to form part of the garrison.

=== 1758–1760 ===
At the capitulation at the Second Siege of Schweidnitz, 200 of the originally 300 men of the regiment, including Captain Horle, became prisoners of the Prussian army after the bombardment of the fortress and the storming of the outwork.

At the beginning of the Prussian invasion of Moravia, the regiment remained part of Daun's army and was stationed at Litomyšl. Its grenadiers formed the vanguard during the march to Svitavy, after which the regiment encamped at Předlice and Ivanovice na Hané. During the subsequent siege of Olmütz, Deutschmeister grenadiers helped repel repeated Prussian attacks, especially in heavy fighting near Křenovice. Frederick the Great would soon be forced to abandon the siege and withdraw from Moravia due to supply shortages and the approach of an Austrian relief force following the Battle of Domstadtl.

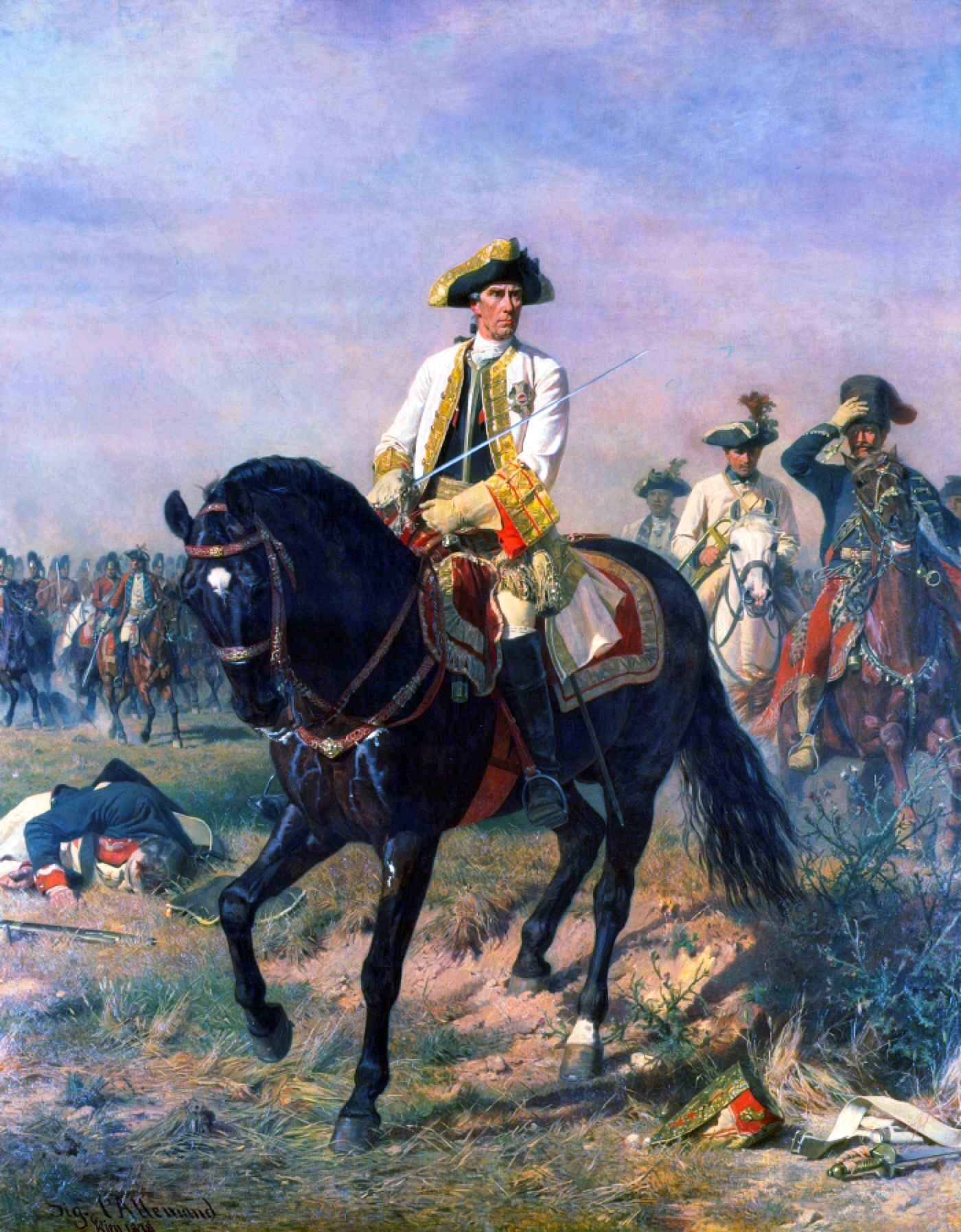
Ernst Gideon von Laudon, commander of the Corps to which the Deutschmeister regiment was attached

Following the battle, the entire regiment, including its grenadiers, was assigned to Christoph von Baden-Durlach and deployed to the Silesian border near Sulików to defend Silesia and Upper Lusatia against further Prussian incursions. After the Battle of Hochkirch, it occupied Prussian entrenchments and positions, though it did not take part in the fighting. It next saw action during the Siege of Neisse, where its third battalion escorted heavy artillery before the siege was eventually lifted.

In 1759, the regiment was moved between Bruntál, Osoblaha, and then Heřmanovice, where it remained until June before continuing to Leszno and eventually Görlitz. It was forced to abandon Görlitz after a Prussian advance and withdrew to defensive positions around Bautzen to protect the magazines. On September 24, the regiment was transferred to Ernst Gideon von Laudon's Corps and marched to Zielona Gora where Loudon made a junction with the Russians.

After further movements through Polish–Lithuanian western Galicia near Kraków, the regiment was ordered to march to Prague and then towards Liberec, using requisitioned sledges to speed up its advance.

On 23 June 1760, the regiment and its grenadiers took part in the Battle of Landeshut. The grenadiers were detached and assigned to Field Marshal Joseph Cavaliere di Campitelli's corps in the first line, while the rest of the regiment served in Field Marshal Philipp Christoph von Müffling's second line. At 2:00 AM, four howitzers positioned on the Steinberg signalled the start of the engagement despite a heavy thunderstorm.

Joseph Esterházy's and Ernst Gideon von Loudon's infantry initially failed to capture the hill near Kirchberg, after which the Deutschmeister were committed to the assault. They drove back the Prussians at the point of the bayonet, capturing their guns in the process, and went on to take a second hill in their first assault. The battle ended in a decisive Austrian victory, and the regiment again distinguished itself as a formidable foe.

On 15 August, Loudon's corps was surprised and defeated at the Battle of Liegnitz after three hours of fighting, suffering heavy losses before retreating in good order. During the battle, Prussian cavalry repeatedly attacked the regiment, but it managed to withdraw behind artillery positions at Bíňovce. Loudon then joined the Austrian main army and marched to Freiburg. The regiment later took part in the Siege of Cosel, its final combat engagement until 1762.

=== 1761–1762 ===
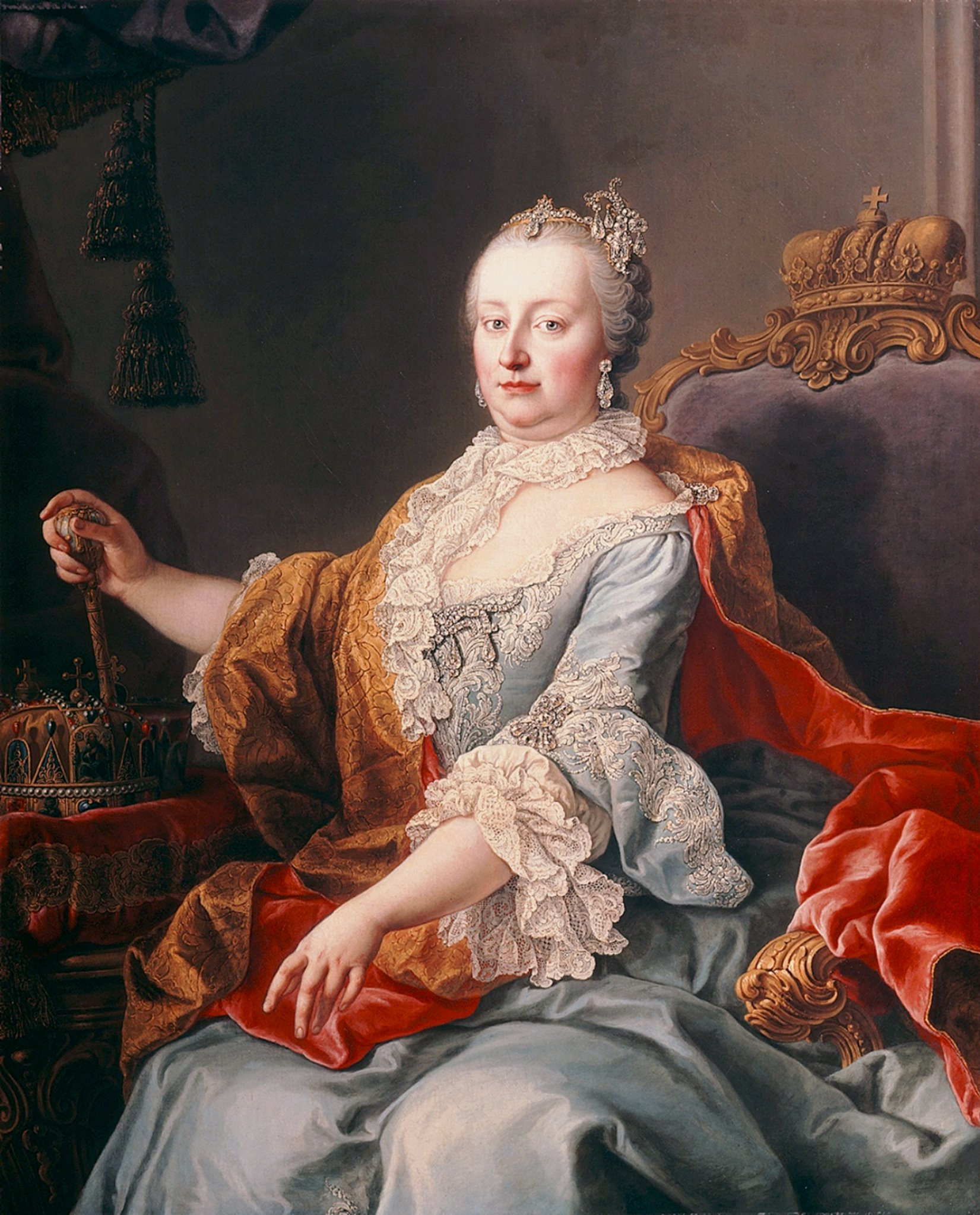
Empress Maria Theresa

During 1761, the regiment was moved between Jugów and Vienna before being assigned to Andreas Hadik von Futak's and then Anton Joseph von Brentano-Cimaroli's Corps with 200 men, including 3 officers of the regiment, which was sent to Świdnica to reinforce the garrison in 1762.

On 6 June, early in the morning, a large Prussian corps surprised Brentano's smaller force but was eventually driven back, retreating to Braszowice. Brentano then withdrew to Wałbrzych Główny. On June 14, Maria Theresa sent Brentano a letter congratulating him on his troops' excellent behaviour in this action and awarding him the Military Order of Maria Theresa. The regiment was subsequently assigned to Franz Moritz von Lacy's corps and took part in the Battle of Reichenbach (now Dzierżoniów), where they suffered a defeat.

After the Prussian victory at Dzierżoniów, the Fourth Siege of Schweidnitz in late October took place, during which the aforementioned detachment under Major Hautzenberg was forced to surrender and was taken prisoner. The rest of the regiment then marched to Saxony, with no significant fighting afterwards.

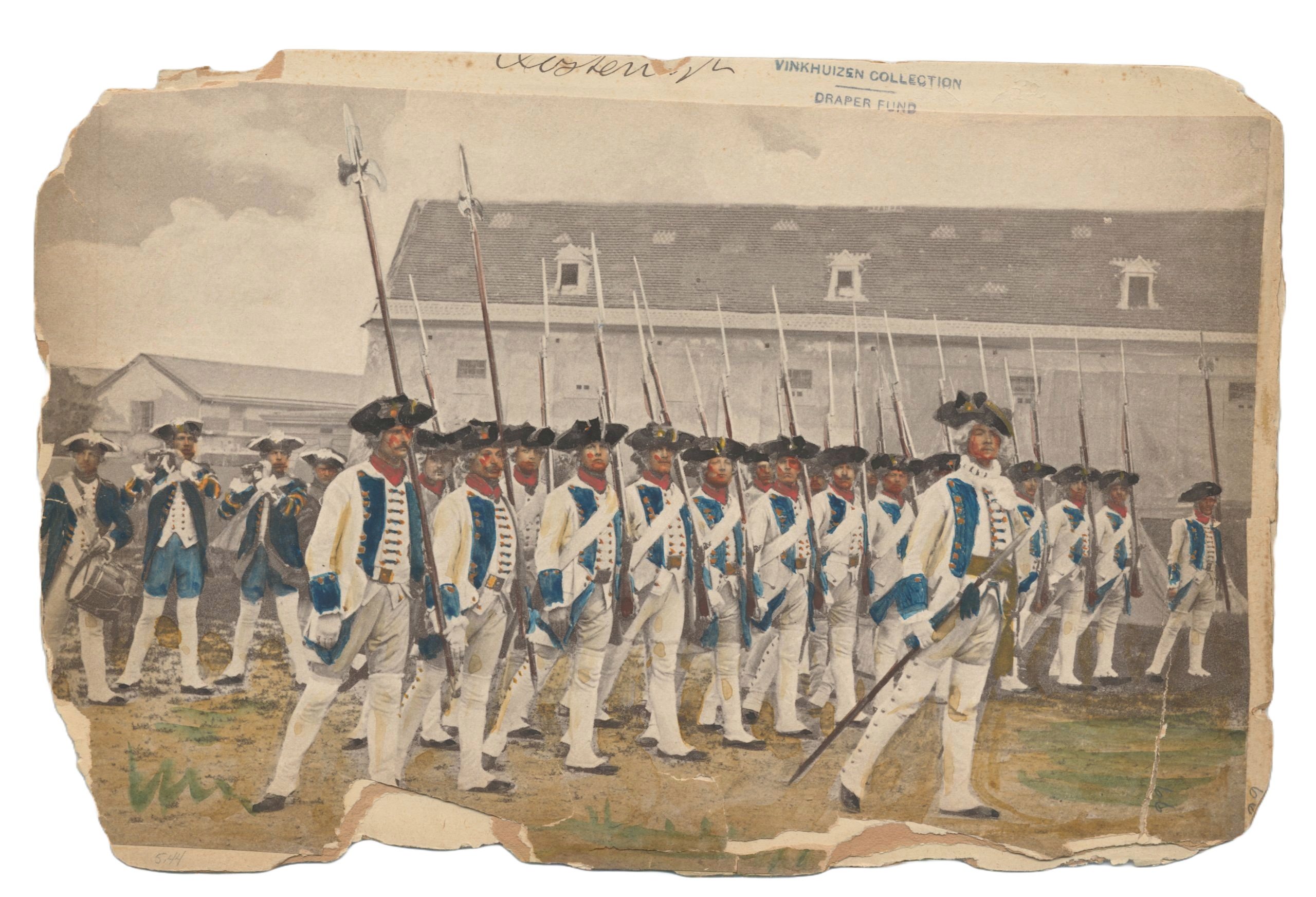
The Deutschmeister on the march (1756)

=== Post-War ===
On March 5, 1763, after the war, both field battalions of the regiment marched to Bohemia and arrived in Loket on March 14, where they remained until May. Afterwards, the regiment marched to Lohr am Main in Bavaria, where it embarked on ships that transported it down the Main and along the Rhine to Cologne, before continuing to Brussels, where it arrived on 19 June. Meanwhile, the third battalion, formerly garrisoning Vienna, also went to the Austrian Netherlands, arriving at Mons on July 21. After several years, the regiment was finally reunited.

Soon after, the regiment was assigned the Vienna Woods and the Vienna suburbs as its recruitment area, whereupon it developed into the Vienna House Regiment. It later on fully transitioned into a Lower Austrian regiment with a strong Viennese identity.

With the introduction of the systematic numbering of all regiments in 1769 under the rule of Emperor Joseph II, the regiment received the serial number 4.

The Ordinar and Leibfahnen used by the Deutschmeisters ~1760 during the Seven Years' War

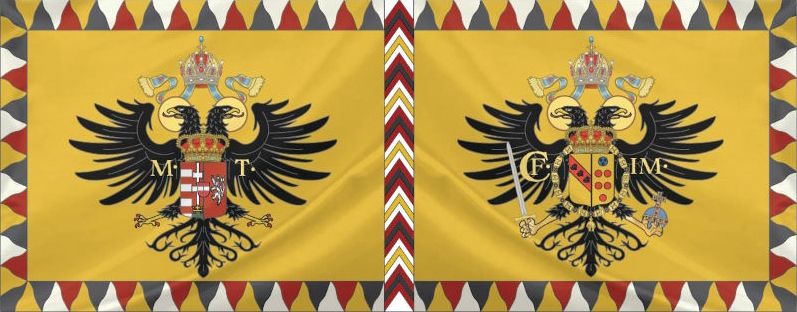

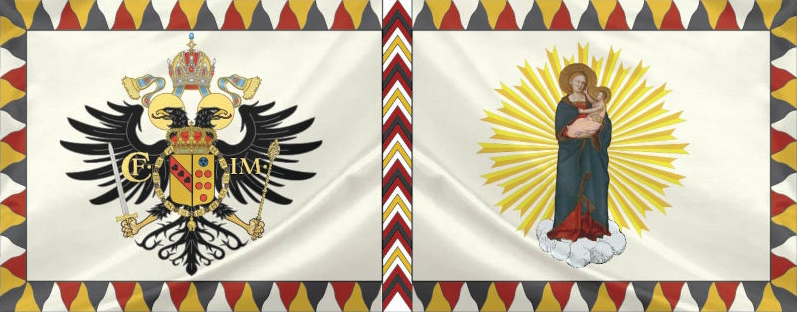

== Austro-Turkish War (1788–1791) ==
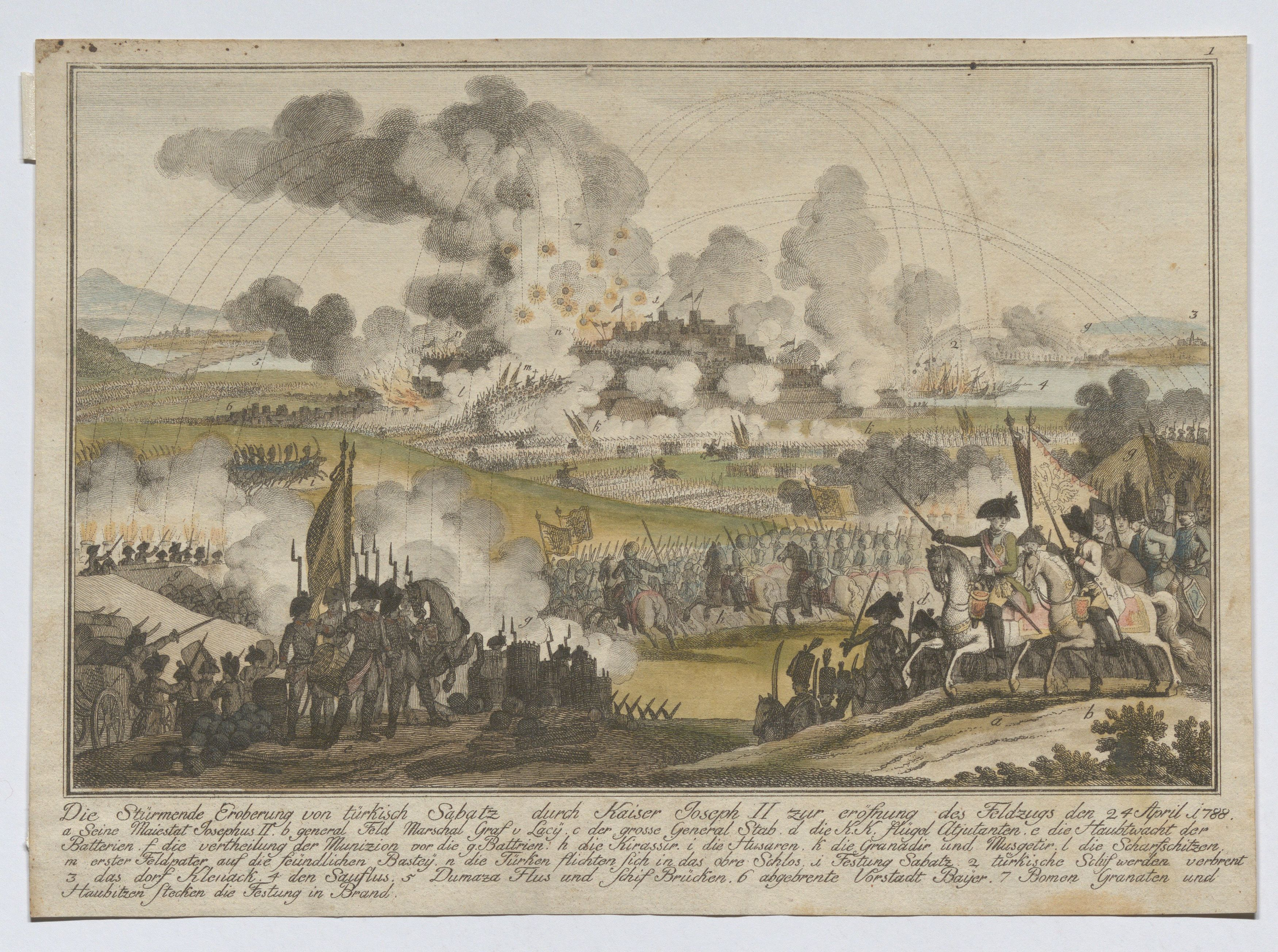
The taking of Šabac on April 24, 1788

Just before the French Revolutionary Wars, the regiment took part in the Austro-Turkish War of 1788–1791. During the conflict, it served on the army's right wing along the Croatian border against the Ottomans.

Its first major operation was the capture of Šabac, a fortress on the right bank of the lower Sava in Ottoman Serbia. The regiment crossed the river and advanced through dense woodland before establishing a camp outside the town under heavy enemy bombardment. To make the following Siege of Šabac easier for the attackers, the outskirts of the city were set ablaze.

On April 24, 1788, after a three-day siege and bombardment, the fortress surrendered to Habsburg forces under Emperor Joseph II. Following the siege, the Deutschmeister crossed the Sava again and occupied the camp at Zemun, preparing for the eventual Siege of Belgrade.

The Emperor often visited the troops' field camps. He particularly enjoyed spending time with the Deutschmeister, for whom he had a great fondness. He later referred to them as "Edelknaben" (noble lads), which became a nickname for the regiment.

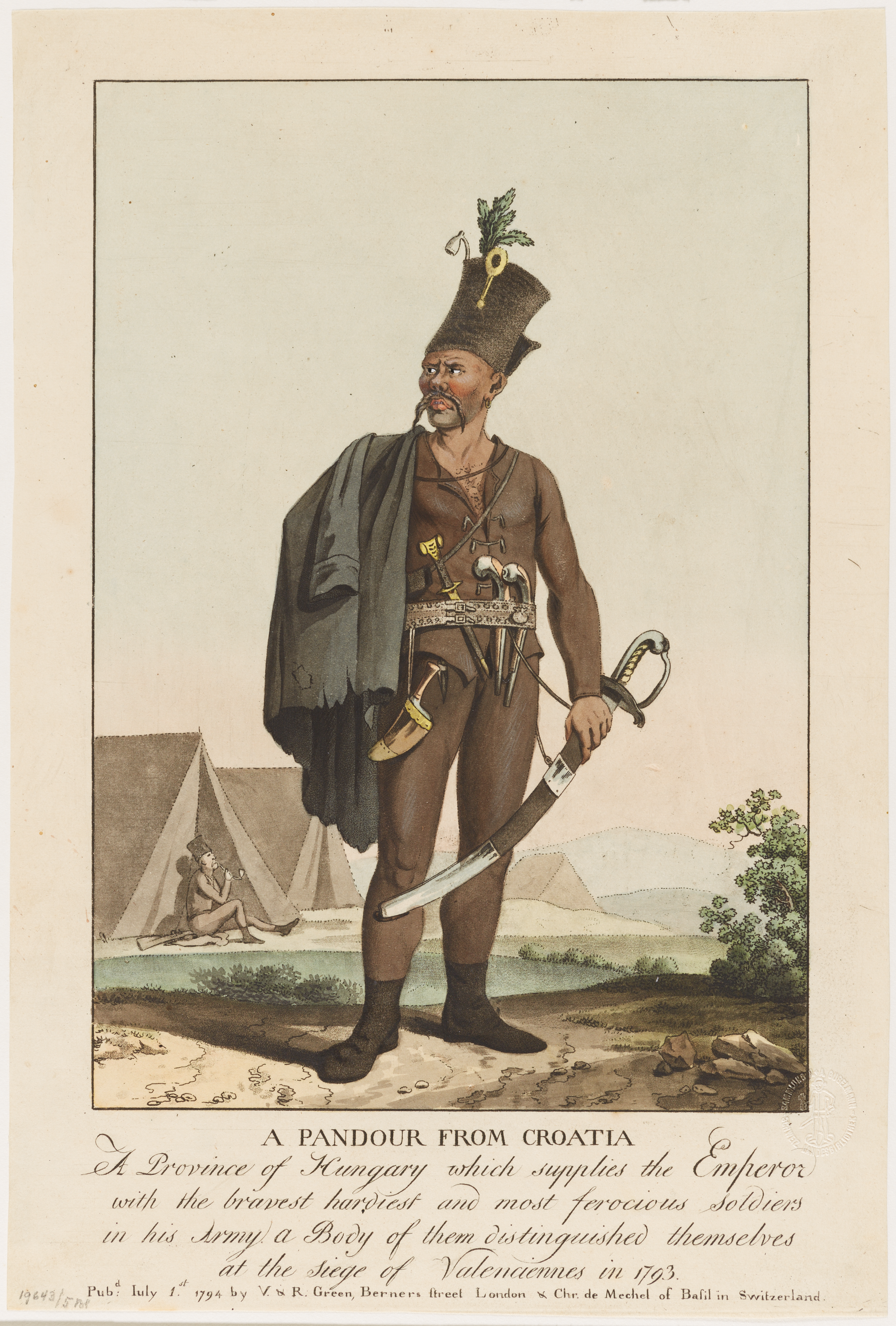
Croatian Freikorps (Pandur)

Because of the extensive swamps along the lower Sava, the regiment suffered greatly from intermittent fever, which claimed many soldiers. The regiment had over 300 men in military hospitals, where dysentery soon joined the intermittent fever in its devastating toll. Joseph II was also affected, contracting a fatal lung condition (exudative pulmonary tuberculosis), which forced him to leave the camp on 18 November 1788 and return to Vienna, where he later died on 20 February 1790. After Joseph II's departure, the ageing Ernst Gideon von Loudon, a general of the Seven Years' War, took over his command.

In the following Siege of Belgrade, the regiment took part in the encirclement and the city's subsequent capture. After a three-week struggle, the Austrians forced the fortress to surrender.

The regiment played an important role in the siege of the castle during the Relief of Cetingrad, northeast of Senj, on 20 July 1790. They advanced on the main gate, creating such noise with their war cries, drums, and timpani that the Ottoman defenders believed a much larger force was attacking and sent their elite units to reinforce it.

Taking advantage of this, the Croatian Freikorps (Pandurss) set fire to the wood the Ottomans had piled in front of the breaches in the ramparts. Within half an hour, the fortress was ablaze, and panic spread through the defenders after an ammunition depot exploded. When the Ottomans attempted to flee, the Deutschmeister drove them back into the flames.

The remaining fortress was then stormed; surviving defenders scattered, and the castle's commander, Dizdar-Agha Ali-Bey Beširević, was captured.

Soon afterwards, the Treaty of Sistova, signed on 4 August 1791, ended the war, in which the regiment had proven itself again as being a disciplined and effective unit.

== French Revolutionary and Napoleonic Wars ==
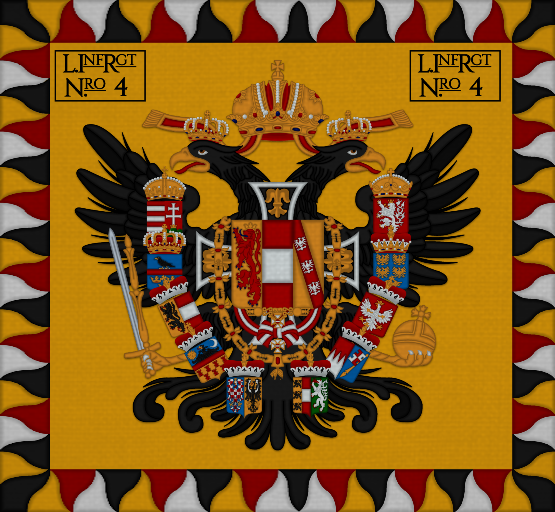
Ordinarfahne (1806)

During the French Revolutionary and Napoleonic Wars, the regiment played a prominent and demanding role in Austria's struggle against the French Empire under Napoleon Bonaparte, including important campaigns like those of Italy, Ulm, Danube, Germany (1813) and the final Hundred Days offensive. It was active in all Wars of the Coalition except the Fourth Coalition, in which Austria did not participate.

At the outset of the war in early 1792, on paper, the regiment was approximately 4,575 men strong, fielding two field battalions and one depot (garrison) battalion. Each field battalion comprised six fusilier companies, while the regiment also maintained two grenadier companies, which were typically detached and combined with those of other regiments into converged elite grenadier battalions. The regiment also included a detachment of gunners and infantry to operate the three 6-pounders assigned to each battalion.

Leibfahne (Front and Back) (1806)

However, the tactical organisation differed, with each company only being able to field 120 men and 3 officers compared to the 230 men and 4 officers on paper, resulting in the regiment, just like many others of the Habsburg army, being much smaller in practice with only about ~1,440–1,680 men able to be fielded. This later changed as the conflict evolved, bringing the regiment to 4,405 men, with 118 as depot.

During the wars fought by the Habsburg monarchy against Revolutionary and Napoleonic France, the Deutschmeister Regiment took part in 90 battles and engagements. In total, 190 officers and 11,777 men of the regiment were killed.

=== War of the First Coalition ===
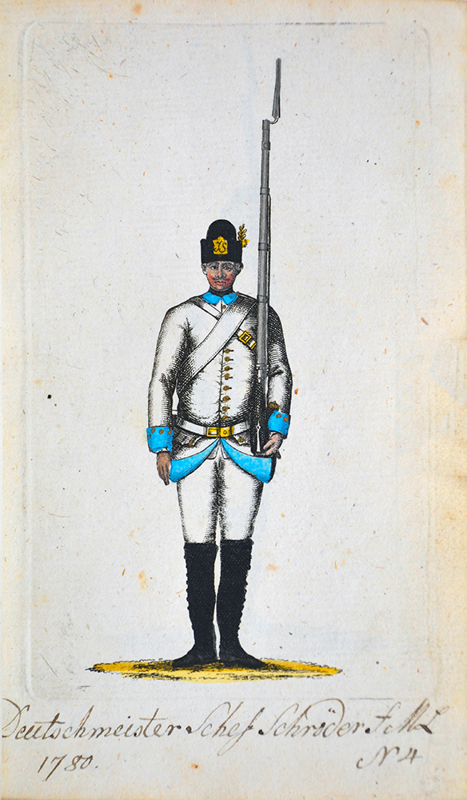
Deutschmeister Fusilier (1780)

During the War of the First Coalition, the regiment fought in the Flanders, Rhine, and Italian campaigns, its Colonel-in-chief being Archduke Maximilian Francis of Austria. It first engaged French forces in the Flanders campaign after marching via Bavaria to Worms and then advancing along the left bank of the Rhine, where it joined the corps of the Duke Ferdinand Frederick Augustus of Württemberg in operations aimed at recapturing the Austrian Netherlands.

==== Flanders Campaign ====
Following the loss of much of the Austrian Netherlands to the French Republic in late 1792 following the Battle of Jemappes, Austrian forces regrouped to reclaim the territory that they had lost early in the Flanders campaign and prepared to confront the French in Aldenhoven, where the regiment achieved its first success in the War of the First Coalition.

The Battle of Aldenhoven commenced on 1 March 1793, during which the regiment successfully crossed the Meuse at night and took part in routing French forces after heavy fighting along the Roer near Aldenhoven and Eschweiler. The regiment later saw further success at the Siege of Le Quesnoy but failed to capture Maubeuge during the Siege of Maubeuge. In the south of the Austrian Netherlands, the regiment again saw success at the Battle of Tournay, where it repulsed several French assaults.

During these battles on the now Belgian-French border, the regiment's grenadiers, which had set out from Vienna in September 1793, served under Dagobert Sigmund von Wurmser on the Rhine and fought in several engagements against the French, most notably at the First and Second battles of Wissembourg.

The regiment narrowly avoided annihilation at Philippeville in 1794, where it fought for three hours before running low on ammunition and coming under severe pressure from French forces. At a critical moment, a daring cavalry charge of the 10th Hussar Regiment, led by Vincenz von Barco, broke the French attack and relieved the Deutschmeister's position, saving them.

Amid a harsh winter, the regiment soon faced severe shortages of food, uniforms and other necessities. Thus, Wurmser withdrew the bulk of his army from the Palatinate across the Rhine, while the grenadiers were transferred to Mannheim for garrison duty. The rest of the Army would soon be ordered to pull back across the Rhine and abandon all positions in the Austrian Netherlands.

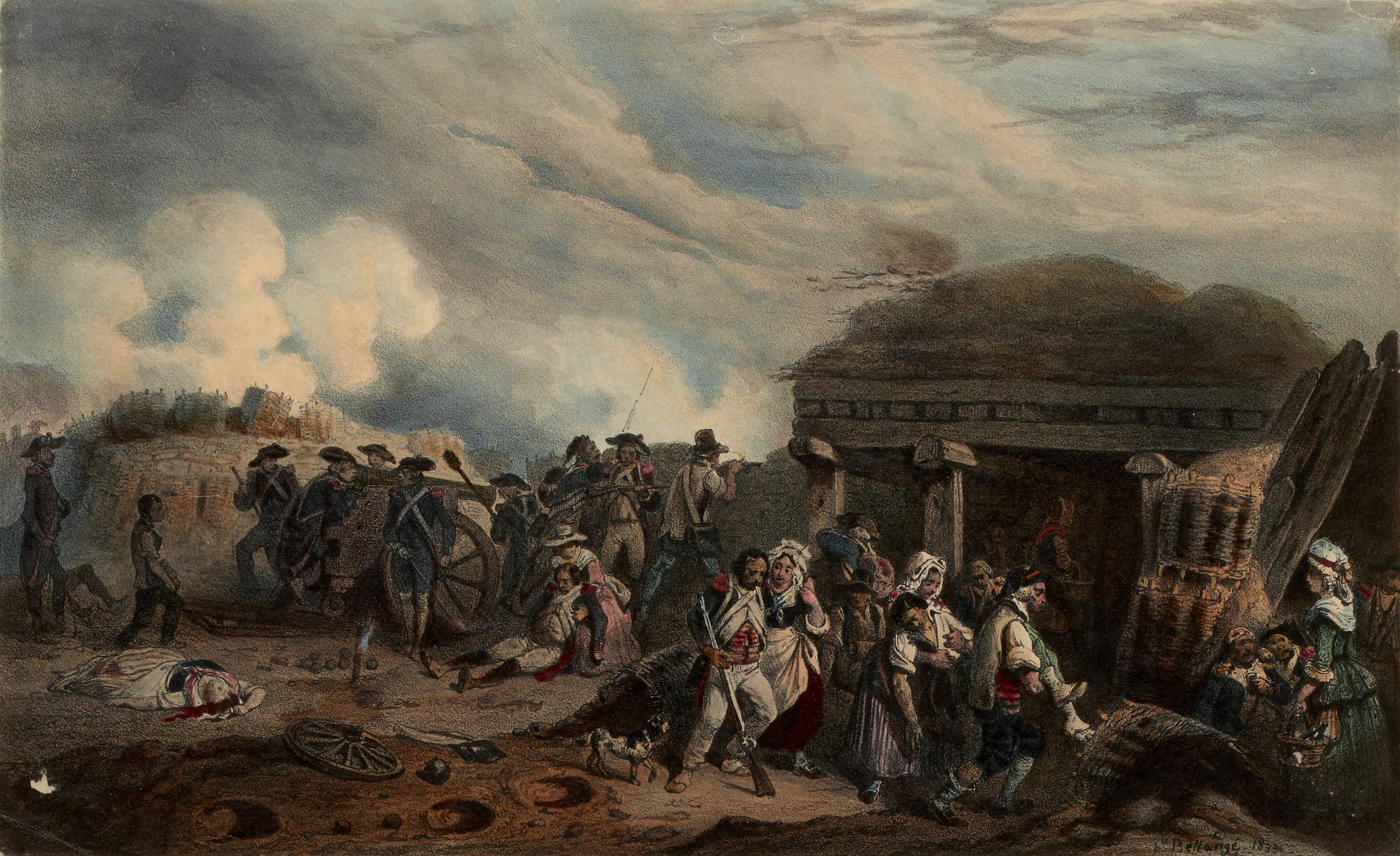
Defense of Landrecies in April 1794, Hippolyte Bellangé, 1833.

Following the Siege of Landrecies in 1794, two poorly supplied battalions of the Deutschmeister regiment were left behind as the garrison of the heavily damaged fortress. Since the defenders had little time to repair the fortifications, the French soon returned and placed the city under siege once again. Moreover, the regiment's men were, for the most part, without shoes, poorly clothed, and utterly exhausted from hard labour, strenuous duty, endless night watches, and inadequate food supplies. Amidst the fighting, they eventually ran low on ammunition, making the situation even more dire. With no relief coming, as the main Austrian army pulled out of the Austrian Netherlands entirely and retreated across the Rhine, the fortress commander surrendered on 16 July.

Following the defeat, two French battalions occupied the fortress but allowed the Deutschmeister to march out with full military honours, their regimental colours flying and music playing, before laying down their arms. The captured officers were separated from the rest of the garrison and dispersed across various parts of France as prisoners of war, primarily in Champagne, where conditions were poor. Guarded by the National Guard, most prisoners from the 2 battalions were held in barns and empty stables under deplorable conditions during the harsh winter, wearing tattered uniforms.

The regiment's cart drivers, assigned to supply convoys, were among the first to escape French custody and report back to the reception commission in January. They were soon followed by small groups of infantrymen who broke out of captivity and made their way toward the border under cover of night, facing considerable danger along the way. Many perished during these escape attempts; of the 1,400 men who surrendered at Landrecies, around 500 remained missing.

==== First Italian Campaign ====
During the First Italian Campaign, the regiment had its first encounter with Napoleon Bonaparte, then commander of the First French Republic's Army of Italy and later Emperor of the First French Empire.

The Deutschmeister's 3rd Battalion, garrisoned at Wiener Neustadt during the Flanders campaign, was ordered to join Feldzeugmeister Jean-Pierre de Beaulieu and was incorporated into his army for the coming campaign in Italy. After a brief stay in Lodi and Milan, it reached Spigno in the eastern Bormida valley and stayed there for a while. Meanwhile, Bonaparte advanced along the French and Italian Rivieras before crossing the Apennines toward the Lombard plain, choosing the route through the Bormida valley to confront the Austrian army.

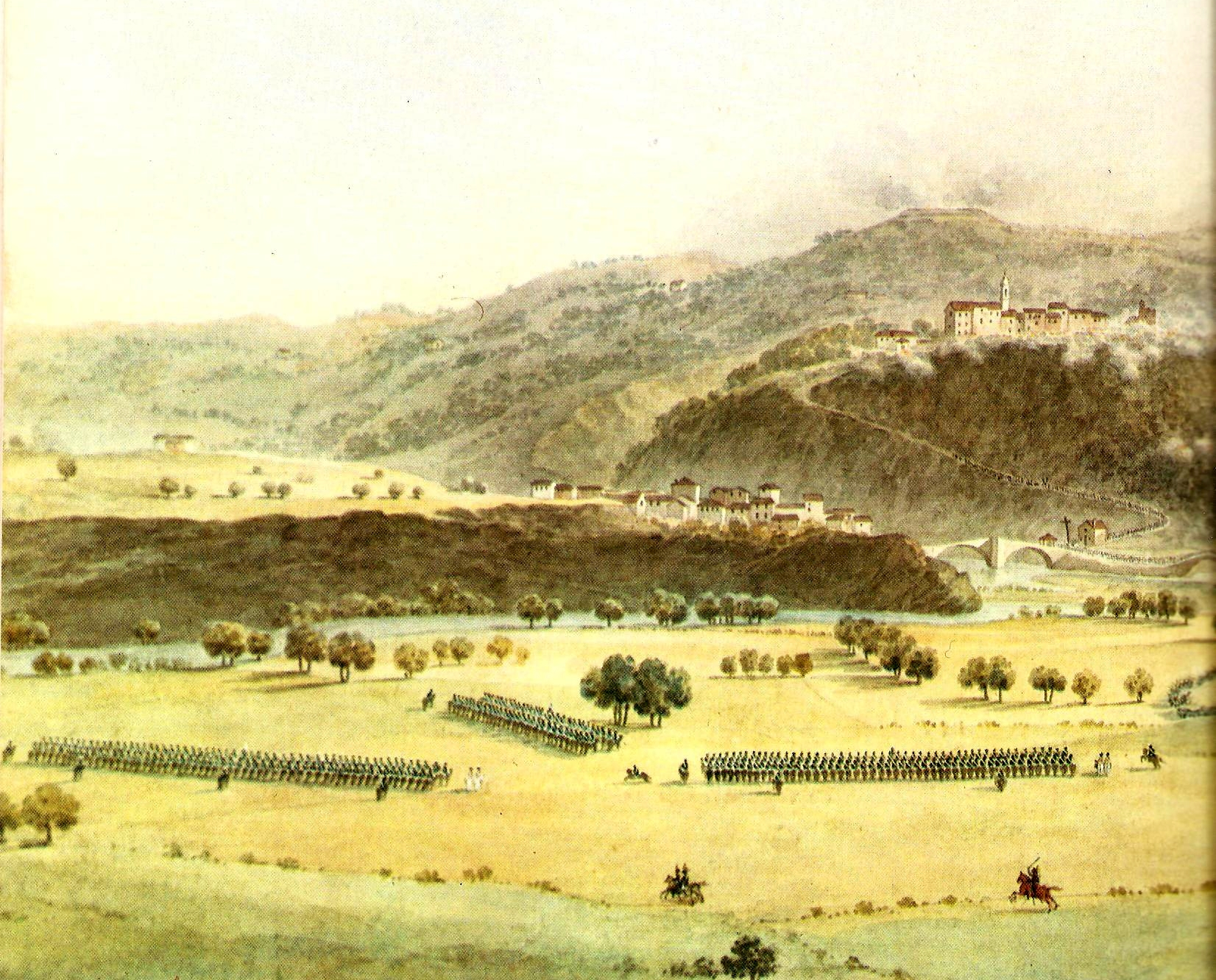
Battle of Dego on 15 April 1796, Giuseppe Pietro Bagetti, c. 1802–1806

Soon on 14 April 1796, during the Second Battle of Dego, heavy cannon fire could be heard from the direction of the town, located roughly 10 km from Spigno. Despite not having received orders, Major de la Blavier ordered the Deutschmeister battalion to advance rapidly toward the battle after hearing the fighting. Upon arriving on the field, the regiment joined two Austrian battalions already engaged against the French and opened fire. It was part of the army's right wing under Eugène-Guillaume Argenteau.

After an hour of continuous fighting, large French forces advanced over a nearby hill and struck the Austrian left flank, which had already used up almost all of its ammunition. To avoid encirclement, the Austrians began an orderly retreat, though cohesion gradually faltered under continued French pressure. At this critical moment, the scattered Deutschmeister, along with other companies, regrouped, counterattacked, and drove the French back, capturing an abandoned cannon in the process.

The French were pushed back to the mountain peak, but fresh troops under General André Masséna soon arrived. Exhausted and heavily outnumbered, the Austrians were forced to continue their initial retreat, during which the commander of the Deutschmeister battalion particularly distinguished himself by maintaining order during the withdrawal. The battalion suffered 57 killed and 92 wounded, while 9 officers and 277 men were taken prisoner.

Napoleon took full advantage of his victory, marching his army along the right bank of the Po to Piacenza, where he crossed the river and advanced toward Lodi on the Adda to attack the Austrians positioned there. At the bridge over the Adda, troops of the Deutschmeister regiment's third battalion played a key role in holding back the French and allowing the remainder of the Austrian army to retreat in good order. Afterwards, the Deutschmeister withdrew to Bozen for reinforcements and supplies, where they remained for some time.

To relieve the ongoing French Siege of Mantua, Dagobert Sigmund von Wurmser ordered a relief army that included the Deutschmeister grenadiers in a secondary column under Peter Vitus von Quosdanovich. Advancing from the Upper Rhine through the Adige valley toward the city, Quosdanovich's force initially threatened the French position before Napoleon temporarily lifted the siege and marched out to confront it, forcing the column to retreat.

Meanwhile, Wurmser reached Mantua but, finding no French army before the city, continued northwest until he encountered Napoleon, who drove the Austrians back toward Solferino after the Battle of Castiglione. Following the Battle of Bassano, Wurmser retreated into Mantua, where the city soon came under siege once again.

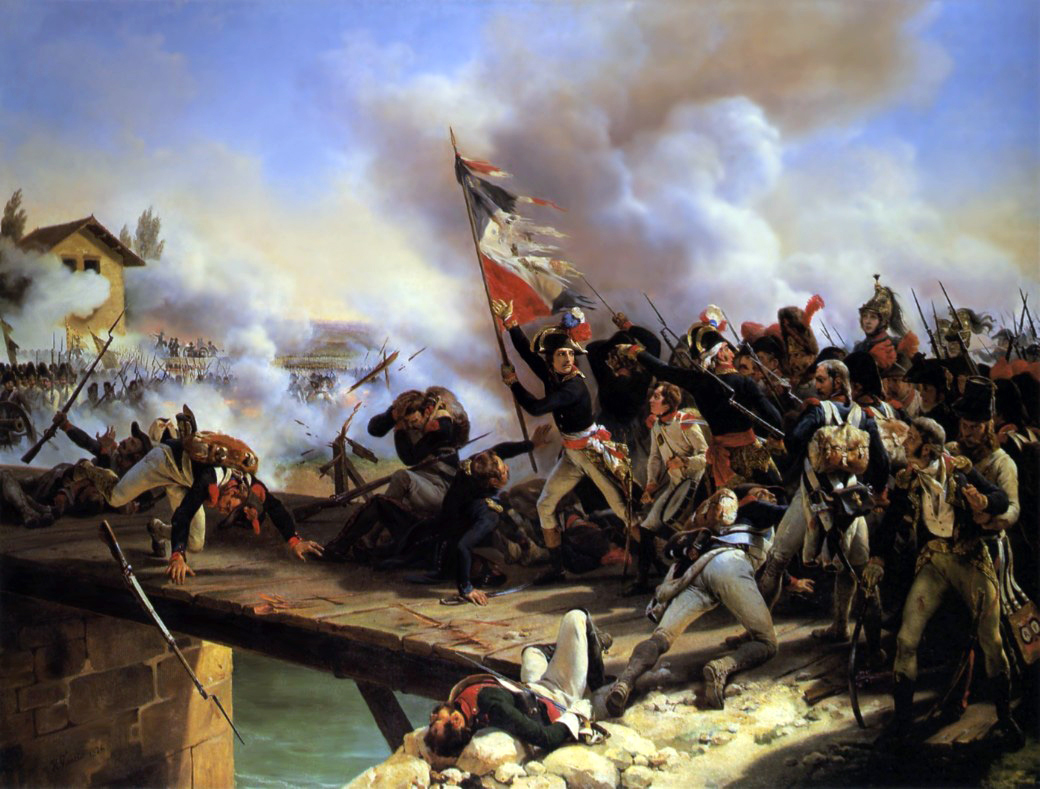
The Crossing of the Arcole Bridge by Horace Vernet, 1826

In late October 1796, the Friaul Corps was formed as part of the relief army, consisting of 2 IR4 and other Battalions under Anton Schübirz von Chobinin and accompanied by Field marshal József Alvinczi, took part in the Second Battle of Bassano on 6 November, where their forces reinforced the engagement near Fontaniva and ultimately forced a French defeat, though both sides suffered heavy losses. At the Battle of Caldiero on 12 November, forces under Prince Friedrich Franz Xaver of Hohenzollern-Hechingen initially held off French attacks before the Friaul Corps arrived later in the day to help drive the French back into Verona.

During the Battle of Arcole, the Friaul Corps was engaged in repeated fighting around Arcole and the Alpone River. Despite initial Austrian gains, French counterattacks and the collapse of adjacent positions forced a withdrawal, though Schübirz helped cover the retreat and secure the Austrian right wing's withdrawal.

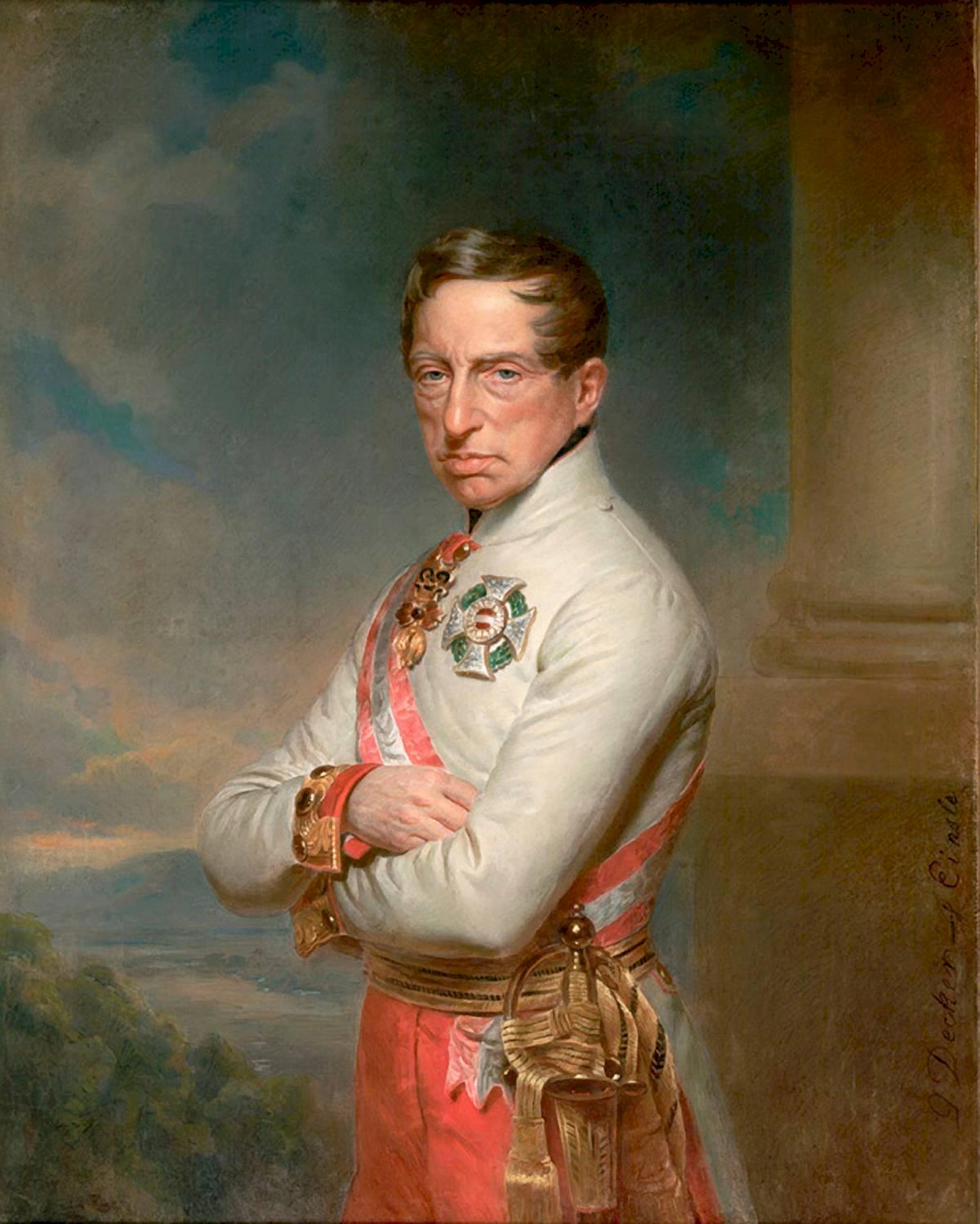
Archduke Charles, Anton Einsle, 1847

At the Battle of Rivoli in January 1797, a battery of 15 French guns opened fire on Austrian dragoons, scattering them. In the confined terrain of the gorge, panic spread as the cavalry fell back disorderly through the closely packed infantry, breaking their formations. As a result, an entire battalion of the Deutschmeister regiment threw down its arms and fled in panic.

Following the defeat at Rivoli, the regiment was transferred to Wiener Neustadt for reorganization, recovering from its earlier losses through generous military funding. The regiment was later assigned to the command of Archduke Charles, whose leadership restored confidence after the earlier defeats. It later moved to Gradisca to cover Wurmsers' retreat, where it next saw action at the Battle of Valvasone in March 1797.

During the battle, superior French forces attacked and encircled the regiment, which held out until it ran out of ammunition. The commandant was soon forced to surrender, with the regiment being allowed to march out with full military honours. The unit was taken into captivity, although many soldiers escaped into the Tyrolean mountains, where they were aided by the local population and guided across the Alps back toward Austria. During a prisoner exchange, officers of the regiment were released on condition that they swore not to serve against France.

This was the regiment's final engagement in the War of the First Coalition, after which it underwent military reforms alongside the rest of the Austrian army.

=== War of the Second Coalition ===
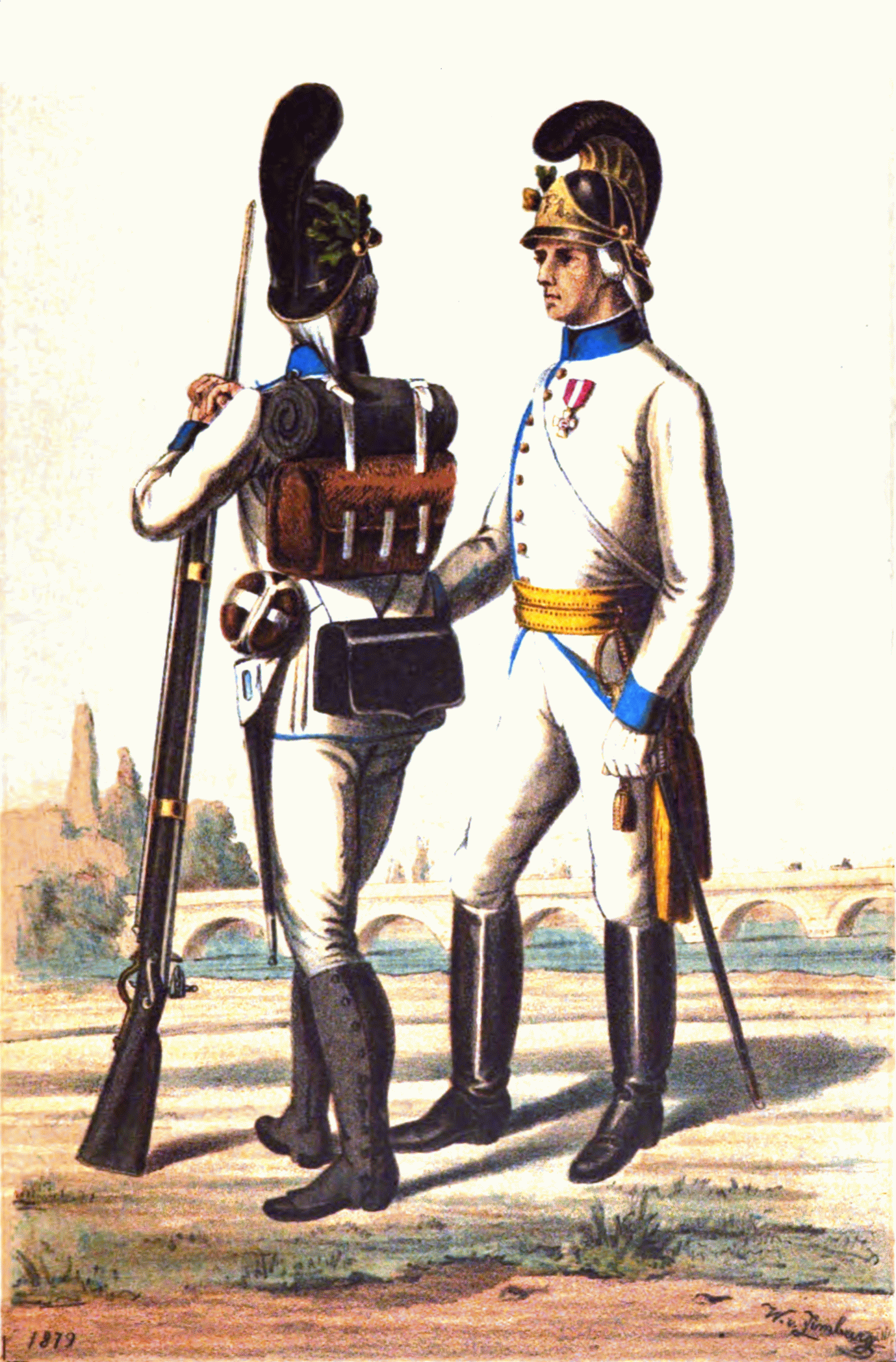
Gemeiner and Officer (1798)

The regiment saw most of its combat during the War of the Second Coalition in Northern Italy, specifically as part of Suvorov's Italian campaign, where it again faced Napoleon.

Its first major engagement of the campaign came at Mantua, which the Austrians captured during the Siege of Mantua in 1799. As the surrendered French garrison marched out of the fortress as prisoners of war, the Deutschmeister Regiment formed on one side while the 16th Regiment formed on the other. In addition to 600 cannons and 13,000 rifles, large quantities of military supplies and food reserves sufficient for a year fell into Austrian hands.

After this victory, the regiment continued down the Italian Riviera alongside Austrian and Russian forces, aiming to capture the remaining French strongholds in the region. It eventually reached Novi, where French forces launched an attack that culminated in the Battle of Novi.

During the battle, the regiment fought under General Paul Kray in the heights around Novi. A young infantryman of the Deutschmeister regiment shot French General Barthélemy Joubert in the chest, killing him and forcing Jean Moreau to assume command of the French army during the battle.

The infantryman was Corporal Karl Strakate, who spotted Joubert riding close to the Austrian line. He advanced with 11 men under cover of trees and underbrush and shouting "Feuer!" ("Fire!"). Joubert, who had just shouted, "En avant!" ("Advance!") to his troops, fell from his horse mortally wounded. Strakate was later promoted to lieutenant and, after retiring, worked as a regional tobacco distributor. In 1843, he donated 500 gulden to the regiment, stipulating that each year on 15 August, the anniversary of the battle, the interest be awarded to eight men of the 6th Company (one corporal and seven infantrymen) who demonstrated the best conduct.

Although disputed, some sources claim that the man who shot Joubert was an infantryman of the 3rd Ogulin Infantry Regiment.

After the battle, Austrian and Russian forces split, with the Russians advancing into the Helvetic Republic and the Austrians moving into Piedmont. The regiment soon marched into Savona in 1800, from where it continued its operations. During this time, the regiment endured severe physical strain, including a 19-hour march through rough terrain. Napoleon marched his army through the Great St Bernard Pass before crossing the Po at Piacenza and advancing toward Alessandria. The Austrian and French armies eventually met at Marengo.

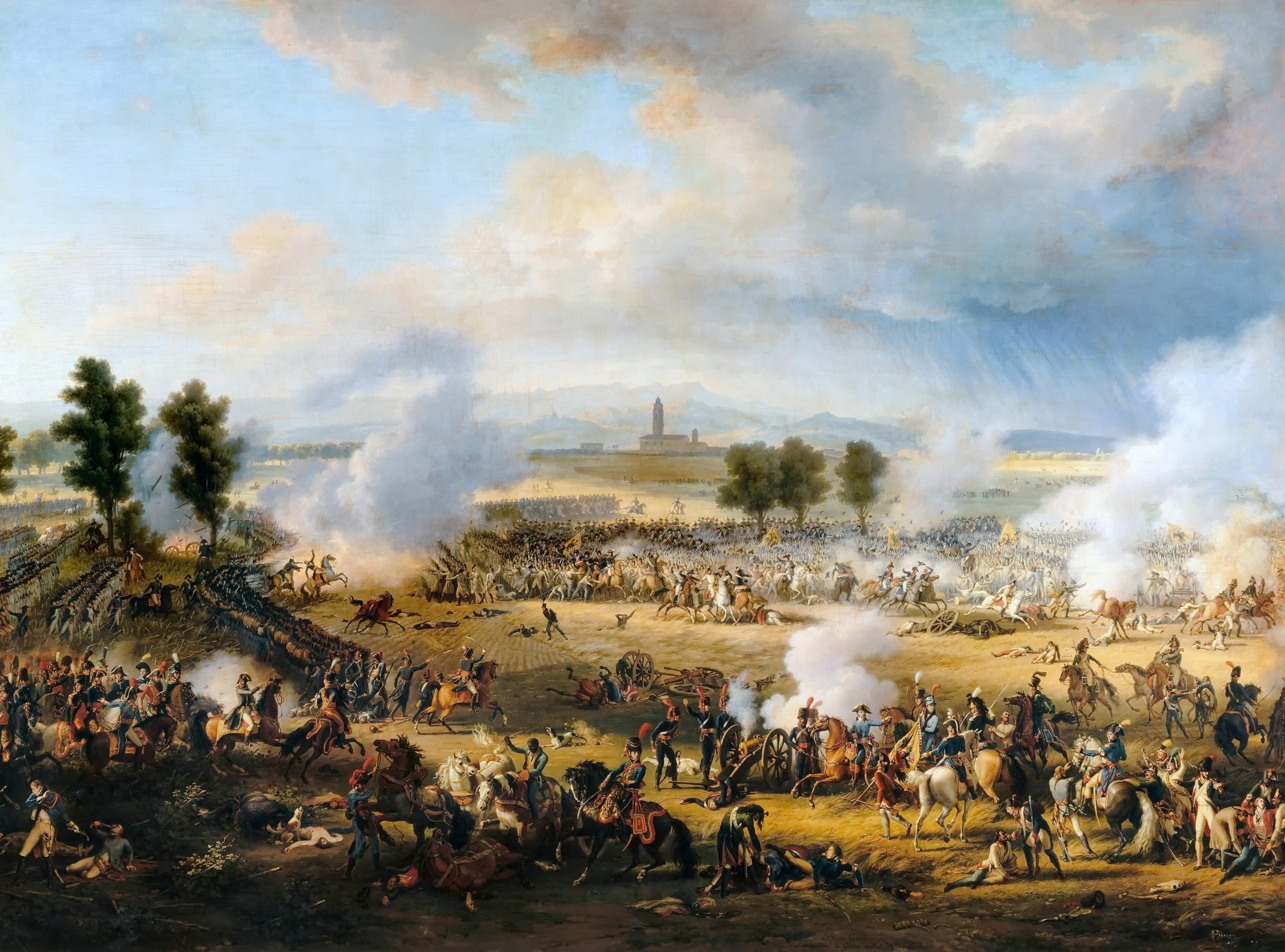
The Battle of Marengo, Louis-François Lejeune, 1801

The Deutschmeister grenadiers played a key role at the Battle of Marengo as part of the Hohenfeld Grenadier Battalion. While much of the Austrian army retreated following a French counterattack, the grenadiers held their ground and covered the withdrawal. They continued covering the retreat across the Mincio before rejoining the rest of the regiment at Udine. From there, the Deutschmeisters marched to various garrison locations, including Vienna, Bruck an der Leitha, Hamburg and Wiener Neustadt, which they reached in June 1801.

After this defeat, the exhausted and worn-down regiment saw no further combat during the War of the Second Coalition. Despite its losses, it managed to capture several French regimental standards, helping to raise morale ahead of the War of the Third Coalition.

=== War of the Third Coalition ===
During the War of the Third Coalition, the regiment fought exclusively in Germany, particularly during the Ulm campaign against French forces. Throughout the campaign, it operated alongside Russian troops. Its regimental commander was Franz Xaver Engelhardt, who fought alongside the unit.

Deutschmeister troops in 1804

==== Ulm campaign ====
In 1805, the regiment was mobilised and joined Michael von Kienmayer's Corps near Ingolstadt from 7 October onward. As the corps of Jean Lannes and Jean-de-Dieu Soult advanced toward Donauwörth, Kienmayer's force retreated beyond Munich, during which command passed to Maximilian, Count of Merveldt.

An Austrian army was stationed at the fortress of Ulm, while Merveldt's corps was tasked with linking the city to the advancing Russians. This effort failed after Ulm capitulated to the French, forcing the regiment to retreat through Bavaria across the Enns, where it took quarters at Steyr. However, as the Russians had also been driven back, Merveldt marched via Lunz and Mariazell to St. Pölten in hopes of reestablishing contact with them there.

The march to Lunz proved exhausting, as the regiment was poorly supplied and was forced to cross mountainous terrain. Arriving on 7 November 1805, the troops set up camp in the snow and soon faced further shortages, as the local population had already provided most of their food to other battalions that had previously passed through the area. Reportedly, a young Fähnrich was forced to trade his gold watch for a single loaf of bread.

During the same night, freezing rain turned the road to Neuhaus, on the route to Mariazell, into sheets of black ice. Merveldt promised 20 gulden for every cannon brought safely to Neuhaus, prompting soldiers and officers of the regiment, including Prokop Lazansky von Bukowa, to help bring the artillery through the steep mountain terrain.

A small portion of the regiment reached Neuhaus on 8 November, where French forces attacked its grenadiers, acting as the vanguard, attempting to exploit the main army's absence. The rest of the regiment soon joined the fighting. During the battle, Engelhardt led a charge with the cry "Deutschmeister, mir nach!" ("Deutschmeister, follow me!"), followed by "Deutschmeister vor!" ("Deutschmeister, advance!").

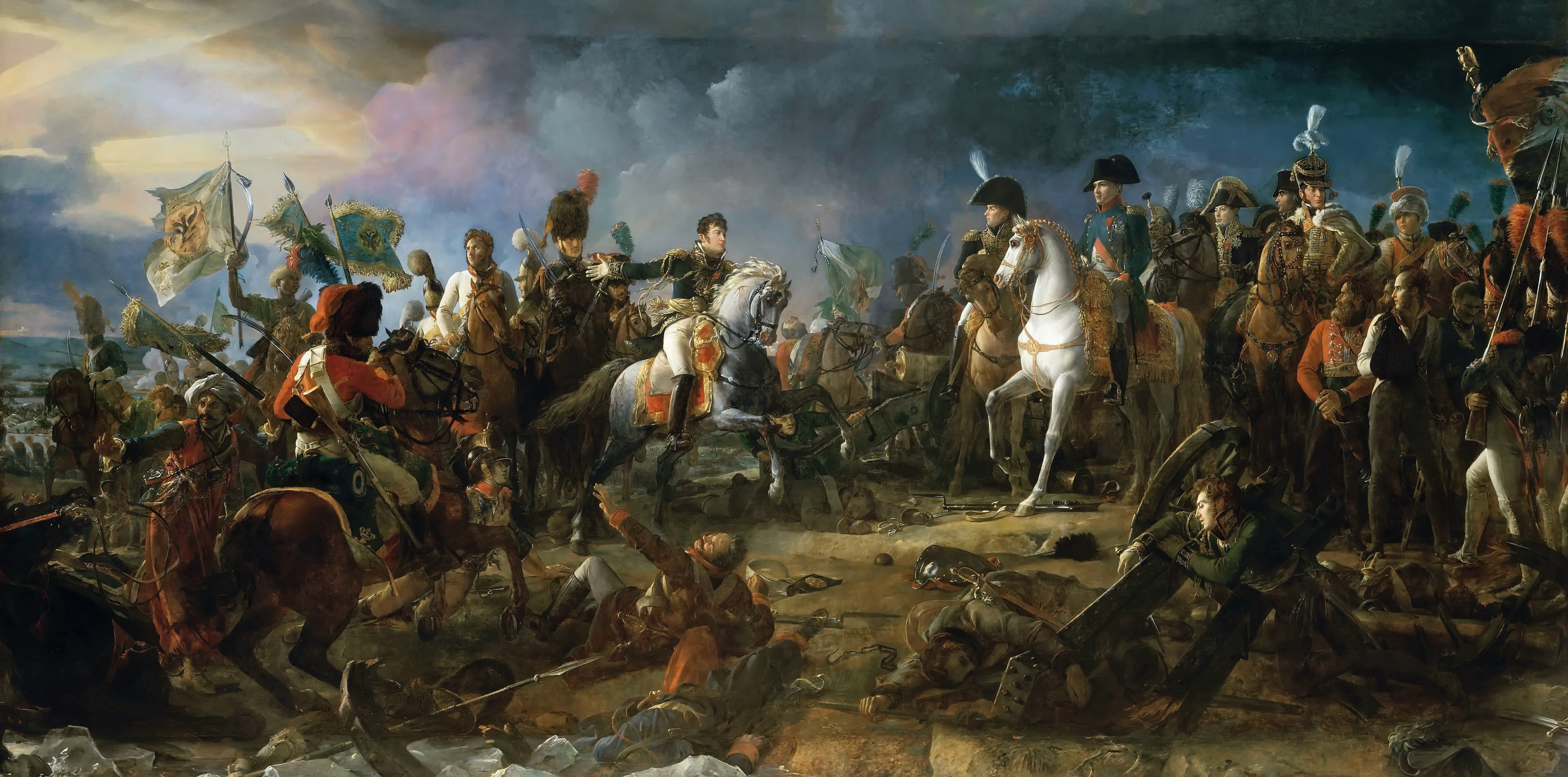
Battle of Austerlitz, 2 December 1805, François Gérard, c. 1810

The grenadiers were engaged at Langau, where they fought a hard 10-hour delaying action. During the engagement, the grenadiers' standard-bearer was killed. Although the French did not capture the flag, they lost it during the fighting. Merveldt himself fought alongside the grenadiers at the front and was nearly captured by French chasseurs. Feldwebel Alfred Matern rescued him in time, saving the corps commander from falling into enemy hands.

In the brutal fighting that followed, the French were driven back into the surrounding mountains. Although the corps held its position, it could not retrieve the cannons abandoned on the way, as French reinforcements had secured the area and blocked the route.

Merveldt then advanced further with his corps, only to come under renewed French attack. The Deutschmeister held out for four hours, with the grenadiers especially showing strong resistance. They, together with Engelhardt, maintained their position under heavy fire and repelled repeated assaults until the French outflanked the line, forcing the corps to retreat back to Neuhaus.

===== The Long Retreat =====
During the retreat, the division of the 5th and 6th companies under Lazansky was cut off from the battalion, and with the route to Lunz blocked by the French, it was forced to withdraw along mountain trails through the Ybbstal Alps, passing the Dürrenstein. The men faced severe difficulties as they entered a gorge, wading through streams, climbing over rocks, and pushing through dense underbrush.

After reaching the Mittersee in Styria, a corporal was sent to Lunz to locate a local guide. Disguised in peasant clothing, he made his way there and met an ironworks owner, Johann von Amon, who agreed to assist the exhausted troops. He brought workers to supply and support the division overnight, ensuring French forces in the city were distracted.

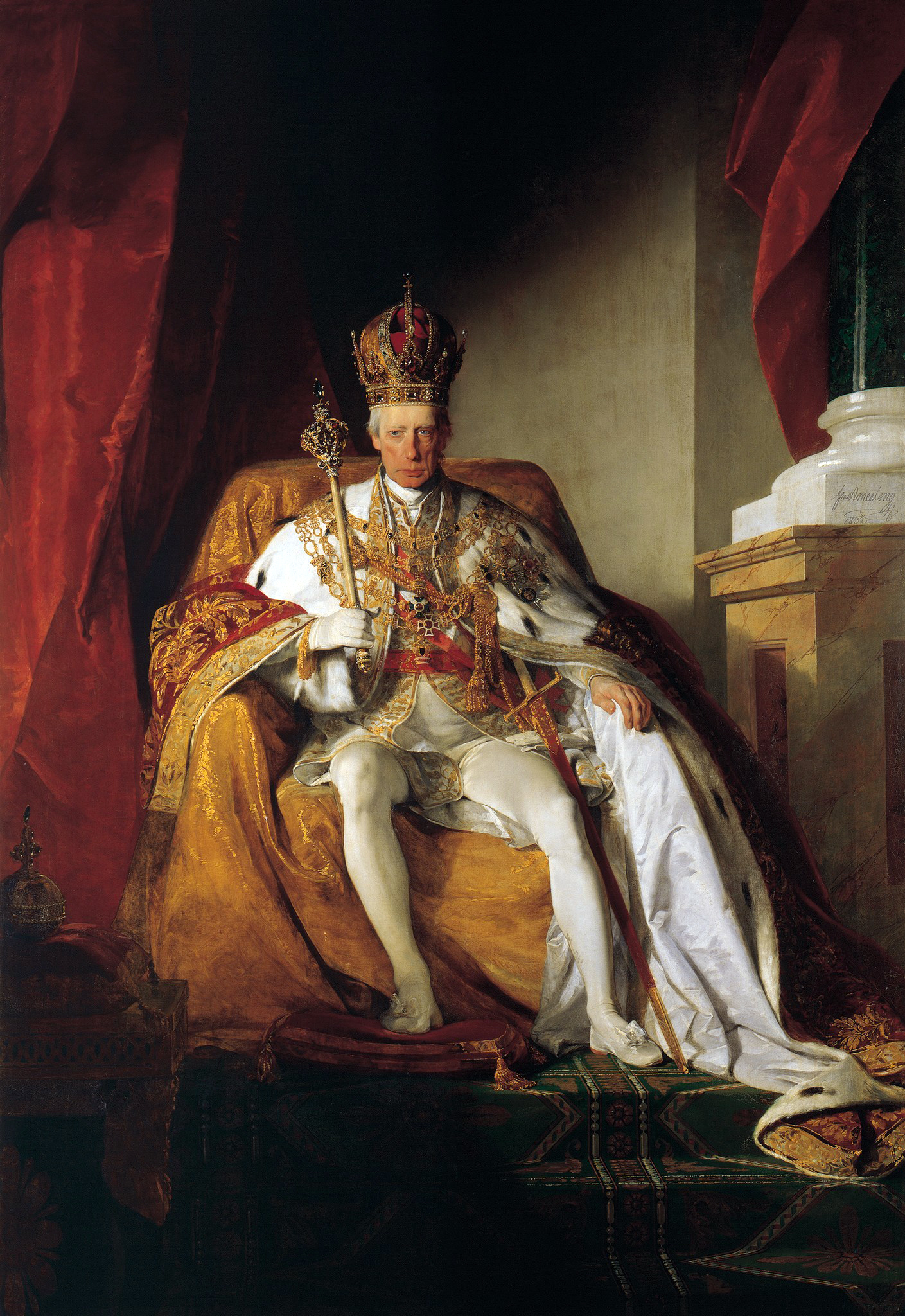
Emperor Francis I, Friedrich von Amerling, c. 1832

With his assistance, the soldiers continued through the high mountain terrain and reached the Lunzer sea without casualties. They then proceeded across the Ybbstal Alps and safely arrived at Mariazell.

Five years later, on 13 June 1810, Emperor Francis I visited Amon and personally expressed his gratitude. When the regiment passed through Waidhofen in 1830 on its return march from Naples, the officers of the regiment wanted to thank him, but found that he had already died on 25 March 1825.

The regiment again saw combat outside the pilgrimage town of Mariazell, where it was stationed. The town offered particularly strong resistance during the Battle of Mariazell, as its church treasury contained significant wealth. Oberleutnant Johann Montluisant quickly gathered a group of volunteers from the regiment and moved to block the French advance, taking a strong position on the road and holding off a much larger force for an extended period. During this time, most of the valuables and treasury were brought to safety.

Only at night did the position finally break, after Montluisant was wounded in the foot by a gunshot and stabbed seven times with a bayonet. Following his collapse, the French advanced into the empty town and captured it. The regiment had no choice but to continue its march across north-eastern Styria, eventually crossing the Danube.

Montluisant survived the engagement and recovered from his wounds, later receiving the Military Order of Maria Theresa and continuing to serve.

The regiment, along with the corps, eventually arrived in Hungary and took quarters in Győr, which it reached on 19 November. From there, Merveldt intended to march to Austerlitz (now Slavkov u Brna) to support the battle, but arrived too late. As the situation deteriorated, his only remaining task was to cover the army's retreat, which he did between Neudorf and Nikitsch. The regiment was only engaged in light outpost fire exchanges.

Soon after, the War of the Third Coalition concluded. The regiment saw no combat during the War of the Fourth Coalition, as Austria did not take part.

In the aftermath of the Treaty of Pressburg, which led to the dissolution of the Teutonic Order in the Holy Roman Empire, Article XII decreed that the Grand Master of the Teutonic Order would henceforth be appointed directly by the Emperor of Austria rather than elected by the Order's chapter, in return for the Order being allowed to have its headquarters in Vienna. From then on, the Order's leadership was held exclusively by Habsburg archdukes until the collapse of Austria-Hungary.

Despite the peace, it underwent reforms under Archduke Charles, including adopting the shako in place of the kasket (helmet) in 1806 and introducing new combat tactics. It would return to action in the Danube Campaign during the War of the Fifth Coalition.

=== War of the Fifth Coalition ===
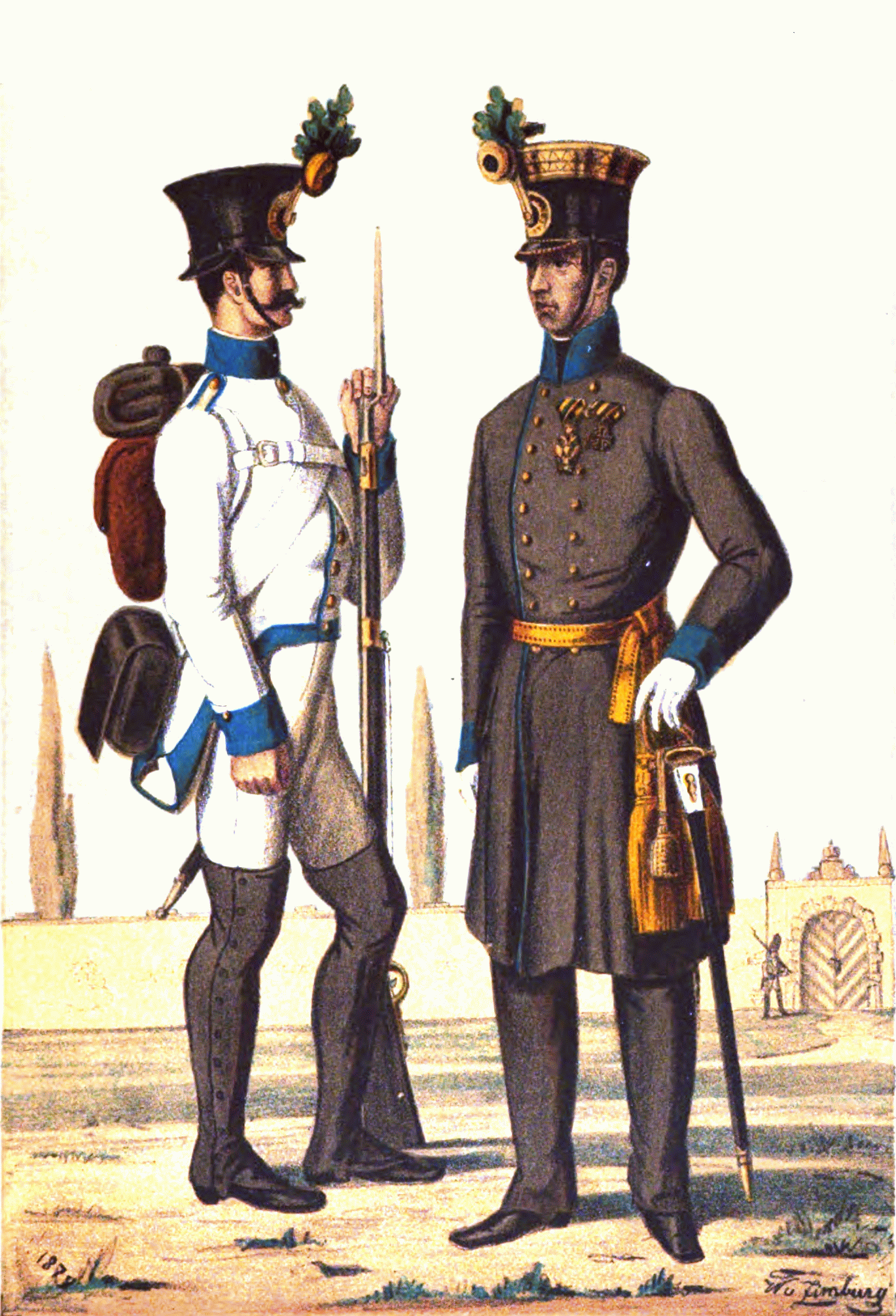
Gemeiner and Officer (1809)

Austria, together with the Deutschmeister Regiment, saw some of its heaviest fighting during the War of the Fifth Coalition in the Danube Campaign under the leadership of Archduke Charles.

In 1808 before the start of the conflict, the regiment was spread across several towns in Lower Austria. The regimental staff and companies 1–4 were stationed at Wiener Neustadt, while the other companies were quartered in places such as Mödling, Leobersdorf, Vöslau, Gainfarn, and Laxenburg.

The regiment recruited replacements from the Lower Vienna Woods region and maintained depot units in Vienna. During the military buildup, additional depot (garrison) formations and companies 17 and 18 were raised, bringing the regiment to a total of three battalions.

Overall strength reached approximately 4,405 men, including 118 depot personnel.

At the start of the campaign, the regiment was assigned to Johann von Hiller's 6th Corps under the division of Friedrich Franz Georg Kottulinsky, with Nikolaus Ungnad von Weißenwolf as brigade commander. It operated alongside IR 49 under Wilhelm Lothar Maria von Kerpen, a former commander of the Deutschmeister Regiment. At first, until 1809, its regimental commander was Franz Xaver Engelhardt, before he was replaced by Joseph von Klopstein. The Grenadiers were detached to Major Franz Friedrich von Scovaud's Combined Battalion in Kienmayer's 2nd Reserve Corps.

==== Danube Campaign ====
The regiment, along with its grenadiers, was mobilised on 25 February 1809. At the opening of the campaign, it crossed the Inn and remained at Neumarkt until 30 March before advancing into Bavaria. During the subsequent manoeuvres, it was cut off from the rest of Hiller's corps after the Austrian defeat at the Battle of Teugen-Hausen prevented the army from uniting.

===== Early Campaign =====
The regiment's first major engagement of the campaign came at the Battle of Abensberg on 20 April 1809, where it fought combined Franco-Bavarian-Württemberg forces near Rottenburg and Mostanerhof, although arriving late. As other Austrian troops retreated, the roads around the town became clogged with baggage trains while French cavalry pressed the withdrawal aggressively.

After the Chevauxlegers of Franz Seraph of Orsini-Rosenberg delayed the French long enough for the infantry to form up, Johann von Hiller personally ordered a counterattack at around 7:00 p.m. to stabilise the situation and allow the remaining units to reorganise. The Deutschmeister entered a fierce fight with Bavarian infantry and overran a Bavarian detachment of 300 men after a bayonet charge. As more French reinforcements arrived, they were eventually forced back by superior numbers, although they succeeded in slowing the French advance and temporarily halting the pursuit. Despite the defeat, the regiment's role as a rearguard helped prevent the Austrian retreat from collapsing into a complete rout.

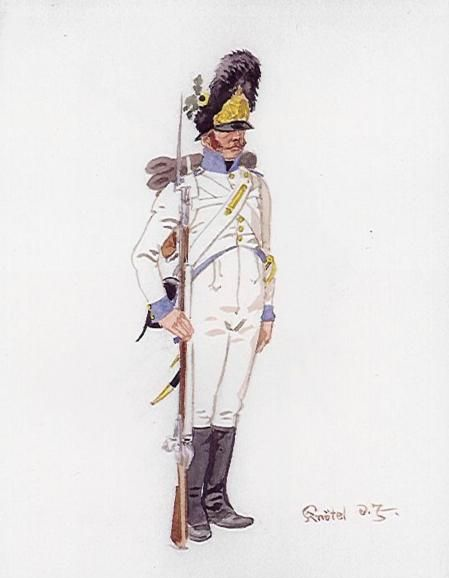
Deutschmeister Grenadier (1809)

Following this defeat, the regiment, together with the rest of Hiller's army, retreated to Landshut, which had recently been taken from Bavarian forces. During the withdrawal, the regiment conducted a difficult rearguard action, as some detachments failed to cross the Isar in time and French advance units had already outflanked them via Geisenhausen. Kienmayer assumed personal command of the rearguard, which included the Scovaud Battalion, and led a fighting withdrawal past Geisenhausen before rejoining the main army at Neumarkt. There, despite exhaustion from continuous marching, they launched a general offensive against French forces to divert attention from Archduke Charles, who had been defeated at the Battle of Eckmühl days earlier.

During the Battle of Landshut on 21 April, a Deutschmeister grenadier spotted approaching French cuirassiers and recognised that his unit would be unable to withstand them. He noticed abandoned gunpowder carts, their wheels broken, positioned between his position and the advancing cavalry. He rushed forward from the ranks, reached the carts, and ignited them. The resulting explosion and fire scattered the cavalry and saved the grenadiers, though the soldier himself was killed in the blast.

Following the defeat at Landshut, the regiment retreated from the Inn toward Linz, serving as rear-guard and taking up positions near Ebelsberg on the Traun River, which it reached in early May. The Deutschmeister held the road on the left bank of the Traun, tasked with delaying the French advance to allow Hiller's army to cross the river at Ebelsberg.

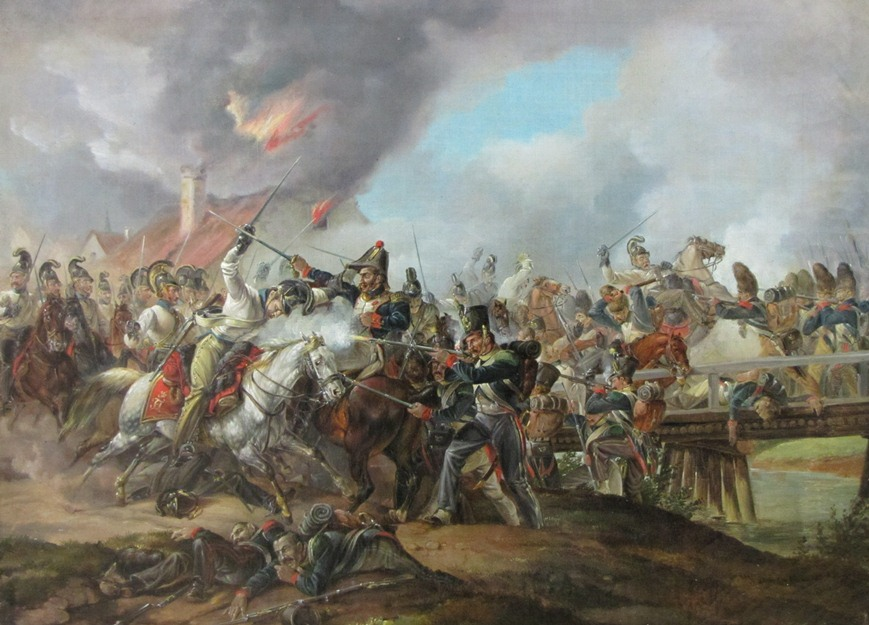
The battle at the Traun Bridge near Ebelsberg on 5 May 1809, Dietrich Monten, 1825

The French soon attacked these positions at the Battle of Ebelsberg on 3 May 1809, where the regiment was engaged in heavy defensive fighting near Kleinmünchen (west of Linz) against infantry and cavalry. It resisted strongly around the bridge leading into Ebelsberg, but after attacks from multiple directions, including the rear, the line began to collapse, forcing a disorganised retreat across the narrow bridge.

During these engagements, regimental commander Oberst Franz von Engelhardt was mortally wounded. Despite determined resistance, the regiment suffered around 400 casualties, at least half of them irrecoverable. After his death, Joseph von Klopstein took command.

At Ennsdorf, the 3rd Battalion, around 300 men, was assigned to a division of the Liechtenstein Hussar Regiment to hold the Enns River crossings in a suicide-delaying action. The unit was deployed near a bridge over the river, where it exchanged volleys with French forces. The bridge soon caught fire, creating panic among the French, who attempted to extinguish the flames. During this, the Deutschmeister continued firing, inflicting heavy casualties.

The French soon deployed many cannon and managed to lay pontoon bridges across the river, but under heavy fire they could not complete the crossing and were eventually forced to break off their attack.

In total, the force held off over 1,000 French troops and an entire army division for a day, at the cost of 29 mostly seriously wounded men who managed to escape the town. These survivors later rejoined the regiment at Grafenwörth. For his role in the action, Joseph von Klopstein was awarded the Military Order of Maria Theresa.

===== Defense of Vienna =====
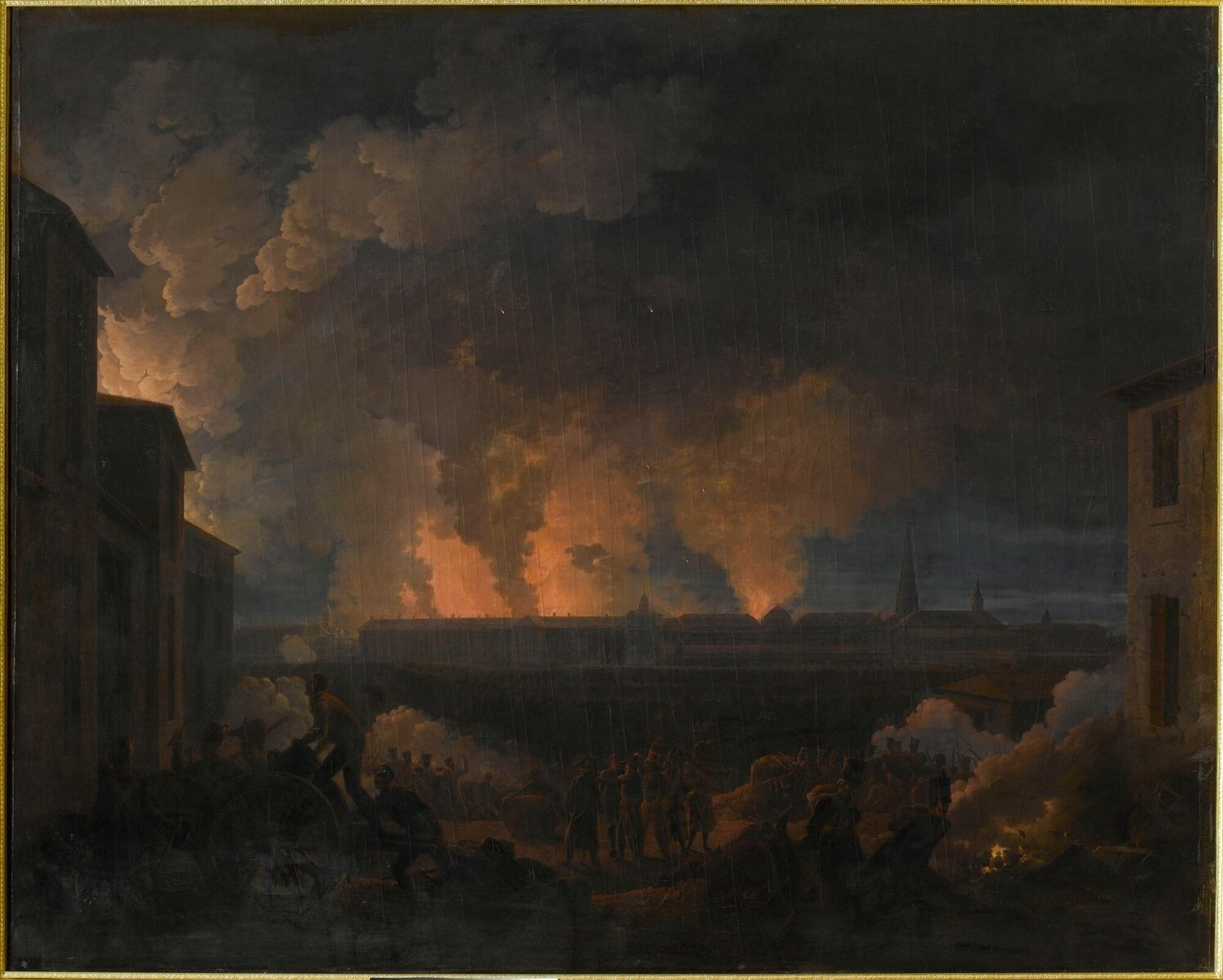
Bombardment of Vienna on 11 May, Louis Albert Guislain Bacler d'Albe, 1809

As French troops advanced toward Vienna, the regiment's detachments were deployed separately across Lower Austria, leaving only around 2,050 men and 33 officers to defend the city. The depot battalion, together with newly recruited soldiers, most of whom had only served for three to nine days, was stationed in Vienna and took part in the defence of the capital. On the night of 9–10 May, they were positioned on the ramparts between Schottengasse and Neutorgasse, where they remained undisturbed.

At around 7 am, the Deutschmeister were quartered in the houses in the courtyard, but they were granted only a brief rest. As French forces approached and individual cavalrymen even rode through the Kärntner Gate into the city, the regiment was ordered back to the ramparts.

By 11 am, 600 men and six officers occupied the Burgwall, while one officer and 50 men were posted behind the barricaded castle gate. A further 600 men under Hauptmann Schwarz and First lieutenant Kraushaar formed a reserve on the castle square, and the remaining 600 were quartered in houses on Michaelerplatz and the Kohlmarkt, where they were supplied with food and drink by local residents.

At 9 pm, the enemy opened a heavy cannon barrage from batteries positioned behind the lines. The bombardment continued throughout the night until around 4 am, with continuous fire striking the city.

At about 11 am, the French launched an assault against the outpost established in front of the Kärntner Gate, which Kraushaar defended with 160 men. The attack was repelled, and despite heavy cannon fire, the defenders held their position and returned such effective fire that the French abandoned the assault.

Although the small Deutschmeister force achieved local success in Vienna, the city was ultimately surrendered on 13 May, as Emperor Francis I chose to avoid further damage to the capital. Around 640 men and 11 officers of the regiment became French prisoners of war, though many escaped with the help of the civilian population, who provided civilian clothing and shelter within their homes.

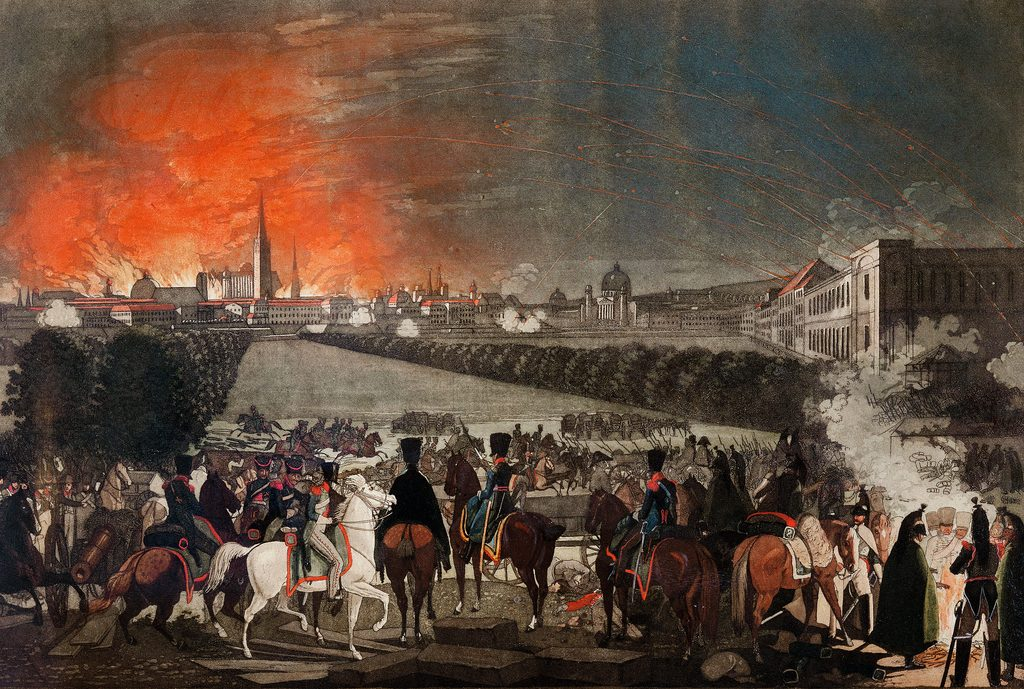
Siege of Vienna in the night of 11–12 May, Benedikt Piringer, 1809

Following this engagement, small detachments of the Deutschmeister regiment conducted skirmishes around Vienna, particularly near the Black Lake at Nussdorf, where the Deutschmeister had set up an outpost. Three gemeiners of the regiment, Karl Jnstel, Michael Putz, and Franz Himmer, were noted for especially disrupting the French occupation.

With permission from their officer, Jnstel swam across the Danube twice. On his first crossing, he captured 33 head of livestock along with a French officer and his servant. On his second crossing, he took six French infantrymen prisoner and helped drive off seven mounted Chasseurs who attempted to rescue them.

Putz and Himmer, having secured a boat on the opposite bank, crossed the river and intercepted a gunpowder cart coming from Nussdorf. They dispersed its escort, threw the ammunition into the river, seized the horses, and brought them back across amid the cheers of the outposts. Himmer also captured a French war commissary together with his servant and two infantrymen.

===== Late campaign =====
North of Vienna, across the Danube, the rest of the regiment continued operations as usual despite the city's capitulation. It would soon take part in one of the most important campaigns of the War of the Fifth Coalition, the battles of Aspern-Essling and Wagram, fought between 21 May and 6 July against Napoleon under the leadership of Archduke Charles.

====== Aspern-Essling ======
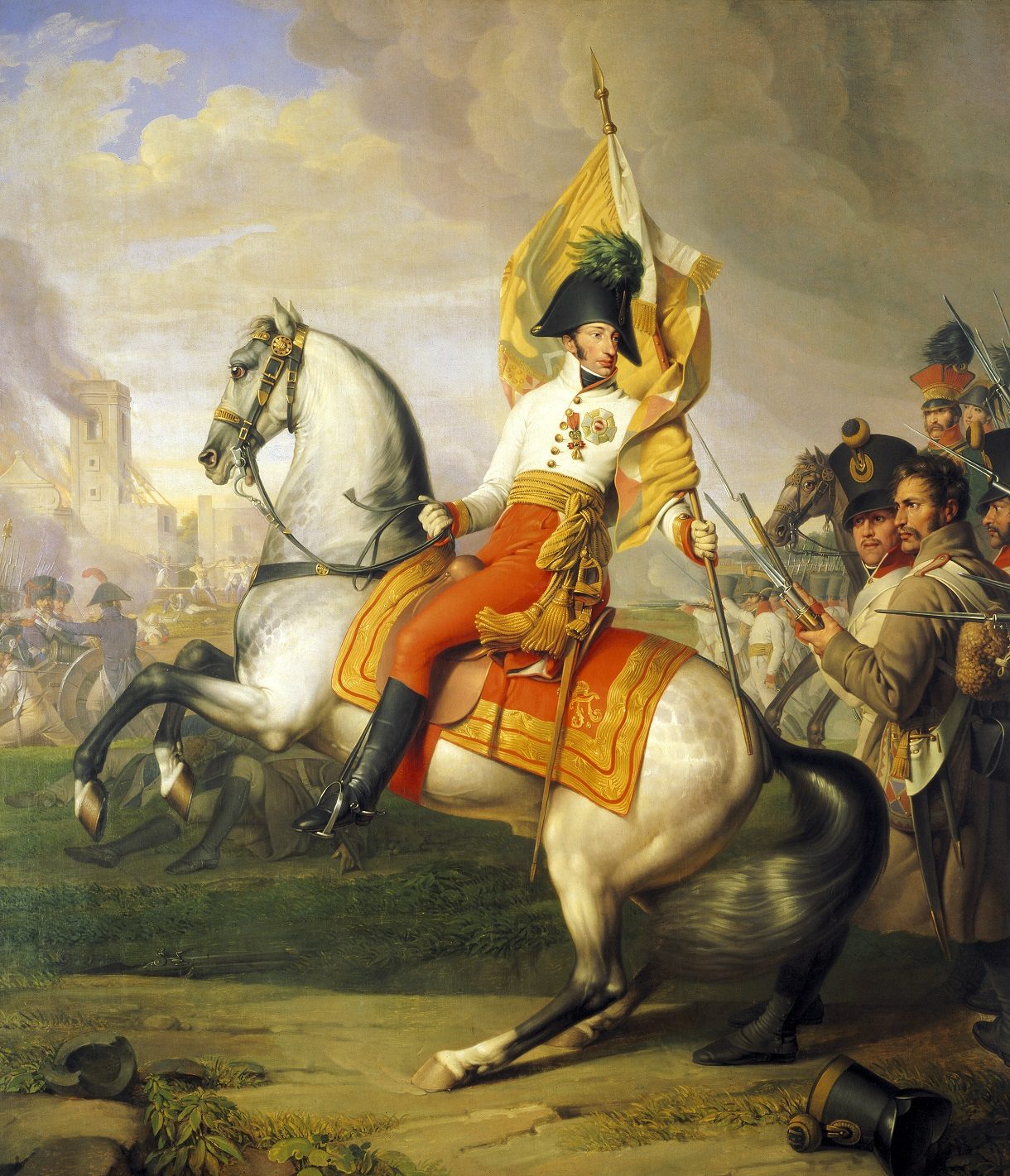
Archduke Charles at the Battle of Aspern, Johann Peter Krafft, 1812

At the decisive Battle of Aspern-Essling, the main regiment did not take part in the fighting itself, but remained on watch duty along the Danube outside the battlefield, where it played an important role in preventing additional French forces from arriving. However, its 200 grenadiers, including 6 officers, did participate in the battle under Friedrich von Scovaud's battalion. It was assigned to Johann I Joseph's I Reserve Armeekorps and positioned in the centre, under the division of Konstantin Ghilian Karl d’Aspré and the brigade of Franz Mauroy de Merville. Stefan Erdmann was the Hauptmann of the grenadiers.

The Deutschmeister grenadiers came into contact with French troops at around 4 a.m. on 21 May 1809 near Stadlau, where they drove back the French outposts and advanced toward Aspern. There, French troops had taken cover in ditches and shrubs around the village, but the grenadiers drove them out with a bayonet charge and continued their advance toward the town.

The grenadiers quickly captured the first houses in Aspern, but French resistance soon stiffened, with defenders firing from windows, basements, and rooftops. The Deutschmeister were forced to fight for every wall and hedge in brutal close-quarters combat, and many of the houses contested during the fighting were soon engulfed in flames.

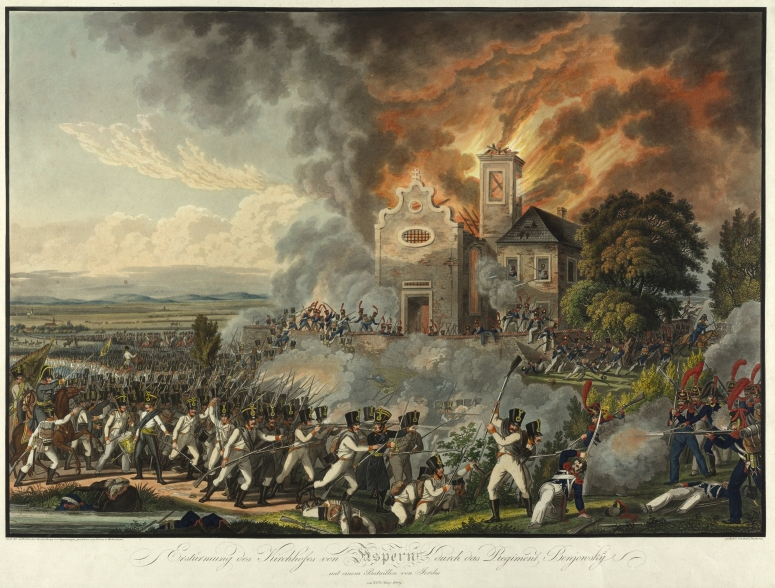
Storming of the church courtyard of Aspern, Franz von Habermann, 1809

Seeking a breakthrough potential similar to that at the Battle of Austerlitz, Napoleon ordered Jean-Baptiste Bessières and Jean-Louis-Brigitte Espagne to advance against the Austrian centre with 12 cavalry regiments and two line infantry regiments, including the positions held by the Deutschmeister grenadiers.

Bessières repeatedly attempted to overrun the Deutschmeister positions, but the grenadiers held firm against the French attacks. Only after a cavalry charge and melee involving the 5th and 11th Chevauxleger regiments against French cuirassiers did the Deutschmeister become threatened, forcing them to withdraw from their position just in time.

After a combined effort by several Austrian regiments, concentrated infantry volleys devastated the French cuirassiers, allowing Hiller and the Deutschmeister to resume operations without further cavalry pressure for the rest of the day. The Austrians then renewed their assault on Aspern, which changed hands repeatedly and was captured and lost three times during the fighting. Combat only ceased at around 9 pm, when the town finally fell to the Austrian forces. The grenadiers spent the night in the devastated town.

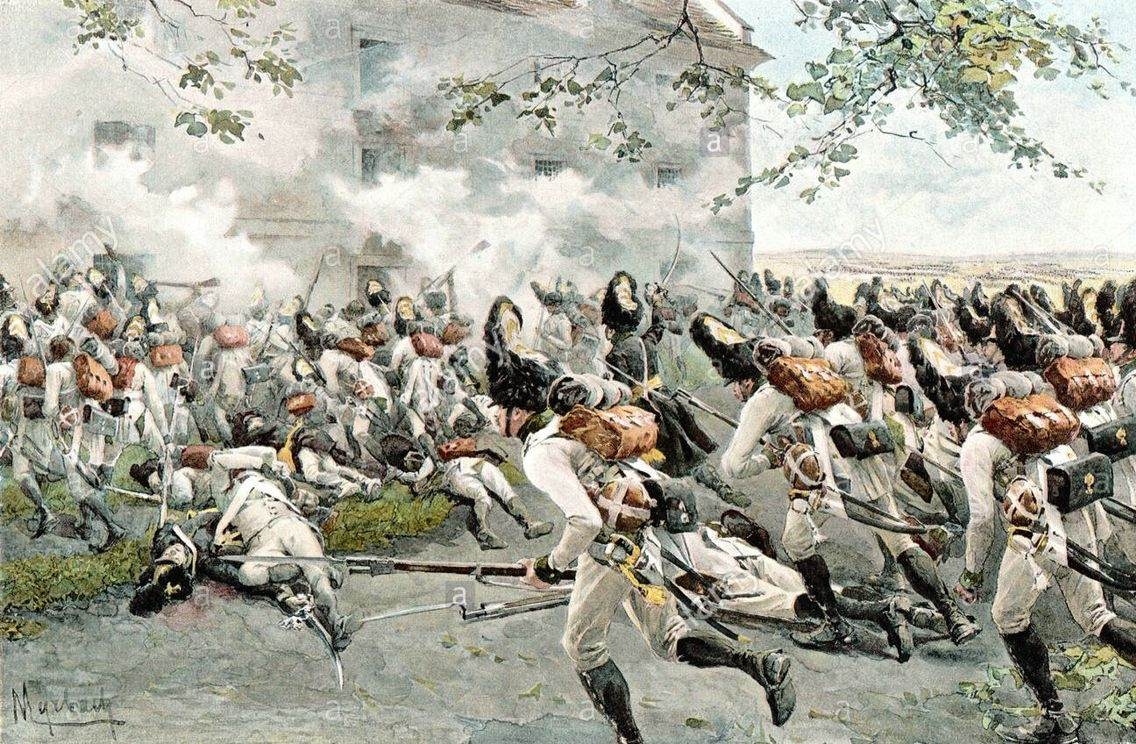
Austrians attack a French granary at Essling, Felician Myrbach, 1906

The next day, 22 May 1809, the fighting intensified as the regiment advanced toward Essling to drive out the French forces there. The Deutschmeister grenadiers were ordered to attack the town's northwestern side and stormed the fiercely contested cemetery in a bayonet charge, forcing the French Imperial Guard to retreat. They continued advancing until ammunition shortages forced them to pull back. The situation worsened further when Austrian artillery mistakenly fired upon them, believing them to be French troops.

Afterwards, the grenadiers attempted to assault French positions behind garden walls, but failed in five separate attacks. No further assaults were ordered, apart from isolated attempts by volunteers to storm the position. The grenadiers then regrouped with artillery support in preparation for a final offensive, but the attack never took place, as Napoleon had already decided to retreat and abandon the battlefield to Lobau.

Through their part in the battle, the regiment's grenadiers helped Austria secure its first major victory against Napoleon after 15 hours of fighting. It would remain in the town before eventually marching towards Seyring.

Out of 200 Deutschmeister engaged in the battle, 62 grenadiers and NCOs and all six officers were wounded, while 16 grenadiers were killed. In the final hour of the fighting, Corporal Ferdinand Fischer assumed command after all officers were wounded, and after the battle he was promoted to Fähnrich in recognition of his conduct. The battalion commander, Scovaud, received the Military Order of Maria Theresa after the engagement. Subsequently, after the battle, Joseph von Klopstein was promoted to Oberst and became the regimental commander.

====== Wagram ======
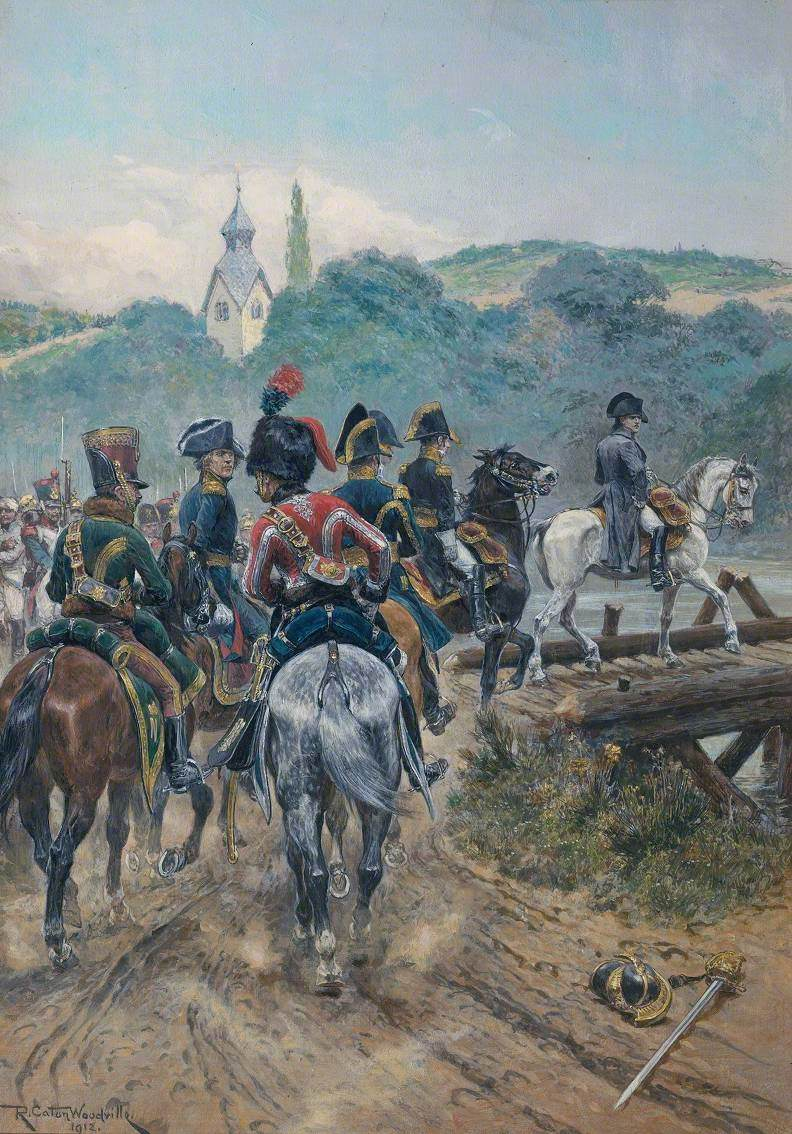
Napoleon Crossing the Bridge to Lobau Island, Richard Caton Woodville, 1912

Following the victory at Aspern-Essling, the regiment moved on 1 July under Mayer's brigade to Groß-Enzersdorf, which came under French attack on 4 July, culminating in the larger Battle of Wagram on 5 July. There, the regiment and its grenadiers fought Napoleon's Army of Germany after it crossed from Lobau onto the Wagram plateau.

The main regiment served in the vanguard under Armand von Nordmann in the 2nd Infantry Brigade of Georg Joseph von Mayer, positioned on the left flank, with Joseph von Klopstein as regimental commander. Its grenadiers were assigned to the Reserve Corps under Johann I Joseph, within the 1st Grenadier Division of Konstantin Ghilian Karl d’Aspré, again under the Scovaud Battalion commanded by Franz Friedrich von Scovaud.

On the night of 4 July, the regiment was positioned behind Groß-Enzersdorf on the Danube, which soon came under a French artillery barrage and was set ablaze. As part of Mayer's brigade and originally assigned to rearguard duty, the regiment began withdrawing toward Markgrafneusiedl behind the Russbach river, a tributary of the Danube.

During the retreat, it continued to come under artillery fire and repeated harassment from enemy cavalry, eventually reaching Markgrafneusiedl at around 8 p.m. on 5 July, after the battle had already begun between 6 and 7 p.m. due to delays caused by the withdrawal.

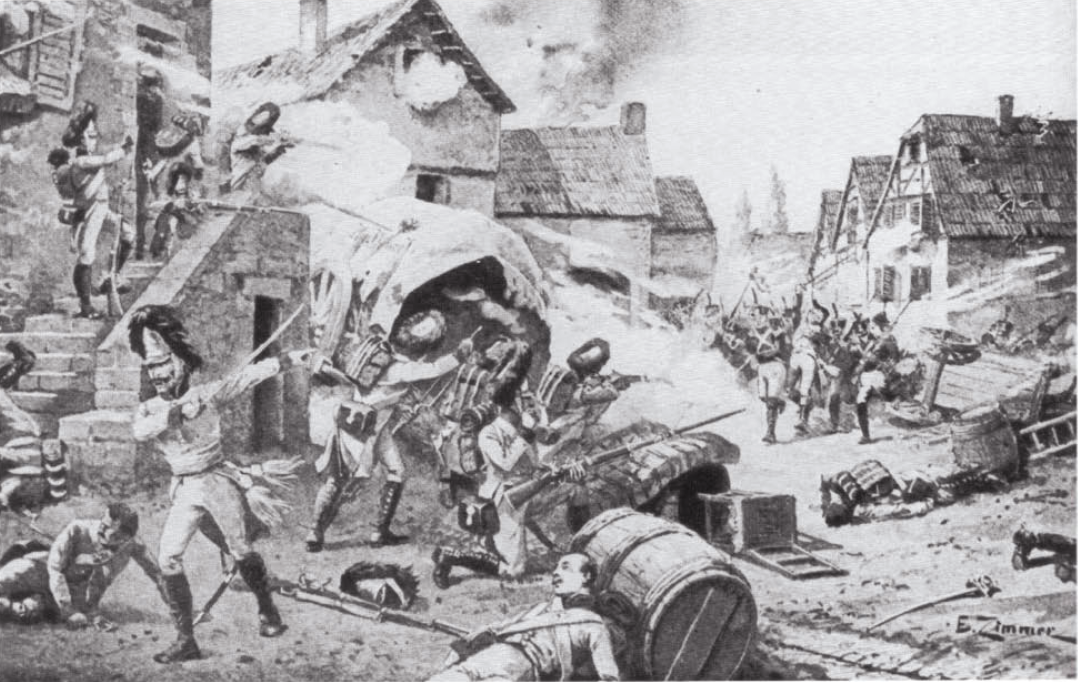
Austrian grenadiers defend Aderklaa, David Chandler, 19th century

Meanwhile, the Reserve Armeekorps, including the Scovaud grenadiers, advanced toward Aderklaa and became engaged in heavy fighting with Franco-Saxon forces. A French counterattack briefly disrupted parts of the Austrian line, but Archduke Charles rallied the troops and renewed the assault. The Franco-Saxon forces were ultimately forced to withdraw from the town, which the Scovaud Battalion held until a later ordered retreat.

The left wing, including the rest of the regiment, came under increasing pressure as Archduke John failed to provide the expected reinforcements. At around 10 pm, heavy artillery fire intensified at Markgrafneusiedl, and with Austrian artillery out of action, French forces advanced on the left wing, attacking from the front and the flank. The Deutschmeister, under Mayer's brigade and reinforced by a previously reserved brigade with artillery, formed up to meet the French flank attack. The French deployed dense waves of Voltigeurs to harass their positions. The regiment held most of its ground in the town, though it was forced to abandon several ditches and positions.

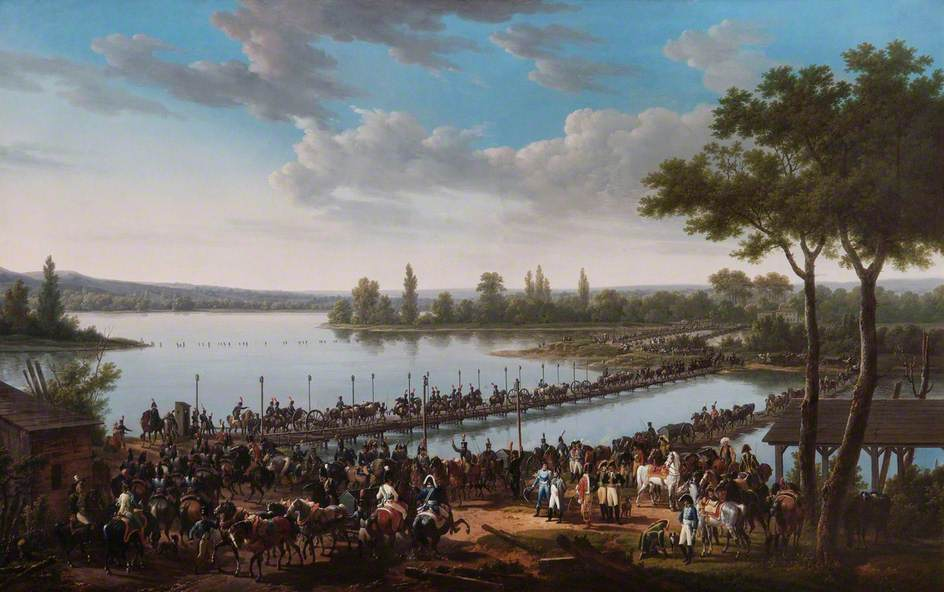
The Passage of the Danube by Napoleon Before the Battle of Wagram, Jacques François Joseph Swebach-Desfontaines, 1810

As combat intensified without support from Archduke John or reinforcements, the Austrian line was gradually pushed back. While the French assaults were repeatedly beaten back, they eventually forced the two brigades to withdraw to the escarpment behind the town. The voltigeurs continued their attacks but were driven back, until a renewed French frontal assault from the direction of Obersiebenbrunn on the left flank forced the Deutschmeister to fall back further.

A hussar charge led by Archduke Ferdinand relieved pressure on the regiment, allowing the frontline units to recover and repel a further French assault. The Deutschmeister soon beat back a second attack, but after a third assault they were finally forced to withdraw under overwhelming pressure.

On 6 July, Archduke Charles ordered the army to begin its retreat at 1 pm. During the withdrawal, the regiment was assigned to guard the valley route toward Groß-Schweinbarth, taking up positions on the heights. By 6 pm, the entire army had begun its march toward Moravia, particularly the grandiers towards Znaim (now Znojmo), undisturbed by the exhausted French forces.

The regiment suffered 45 killed, including Oberleutnant Baron Stockhausen, and 689 enlisted men, most of them wounded by canister fire and some captured. The wounded were housed in the barns and homes of Markgrafneusiedl until a fire broke out, killing many of them.

===== Rest of the campaign =====
On 9 July, Archduke Charles was informed that an army under Louis-Nicolas Davout was advancing toward Znojmo and had already reached Erdberg, about two hours from the town. The Scovaud grenadiers were ordered to occupy the heights on both banks of the Thaya River in preparation for the upcoming French attack.

At the start of the Battle of Znaim on 10 July, the grenadiers had not yet finished deploying when French Voltigeurs began harassing their positions. They secured the bridge on the right bank of the Thaya to delay the French advance. For five hours, despite the enemy holding the higher ground, they withstood continuous French attacks.

The next day on 11 July, a fresh corps under André Masséna arrived with reinforcements, including artillery. Grenadiers took heavy canister fire, which forced them back across the bridge.

Soon after, Archduke Charles proposed a ceasefire, ending the battle and effectively concluding the War of the Fifth Coalition. While most units suffered heavy losses, the Deutschmeister grenadiers were relatively less affected, as they were not exposed to a major French cuirassier charge, thus suffering only 4 killed and 17 wounded.

=== War of the Sixth Coalition ===
Following the last campaign, the regiment settled in Vienna until it was called to take part in the Italian campaign of 1813–1814 during the War of the Sixth Coalition.

During this war, the regiment's honorary title "Deutschmeister" was changed to "Hoch- und Deutschmeister" in 1814 to reflect the fact that the offices of Hochmeister and Deutschmeister ranks had been merged since 1531.

=== War of the Seventh Coalition (Hundred Days) ===
During the War of the Seventh Coalition, the regiment would continue fighting France, later along the Rhône after the Italian campaign of 1813–1814.

== First Italian War of Independence ==
2 Battalions of the Deutschmeister regiment saw action during the First Italian War of Independence.

== Hungarian Revolution of 1848 ==
The regiment participated in the suppression of the Hungarian Revolution of 1848, particularly in the battles of Győr and Komárom.

== Austro-Prussian War ==
During the Austro-Prussian War, the regiment saw combat in the Battle of Königgrätz, where Prussia defeated the Austria.

== World War I ==
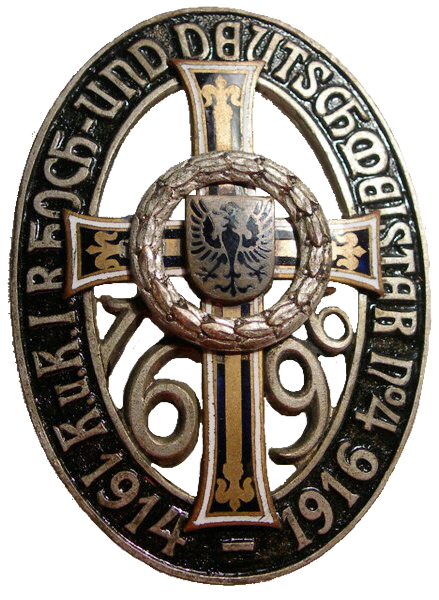
Cap Badge of the regiment

At the outbreak of World War I, the regiment was based in Vienna, and its ethnic composition was 95% German and 5% other ethnicities. It saw combat on nearly all fronts of the war, fighting in the Serbian, Russian, Romanian and Italian campaigns.

In August 1914, it was part of the 2nd Armeekorps in the 25th Infantry Division. Freiherr Ludwig von Holzhausen commanded it.

In 1915, all regiments, including the Deutschmeister regiment, lost their honorary names and were referred to solely by their regiment type and regimental designation number.

== Dissolution ==
In 1918, the regiment was formally disbanded after the dissolution of the Austro-Hungarian Empire, leaving only its tradition.

== Tradition ==
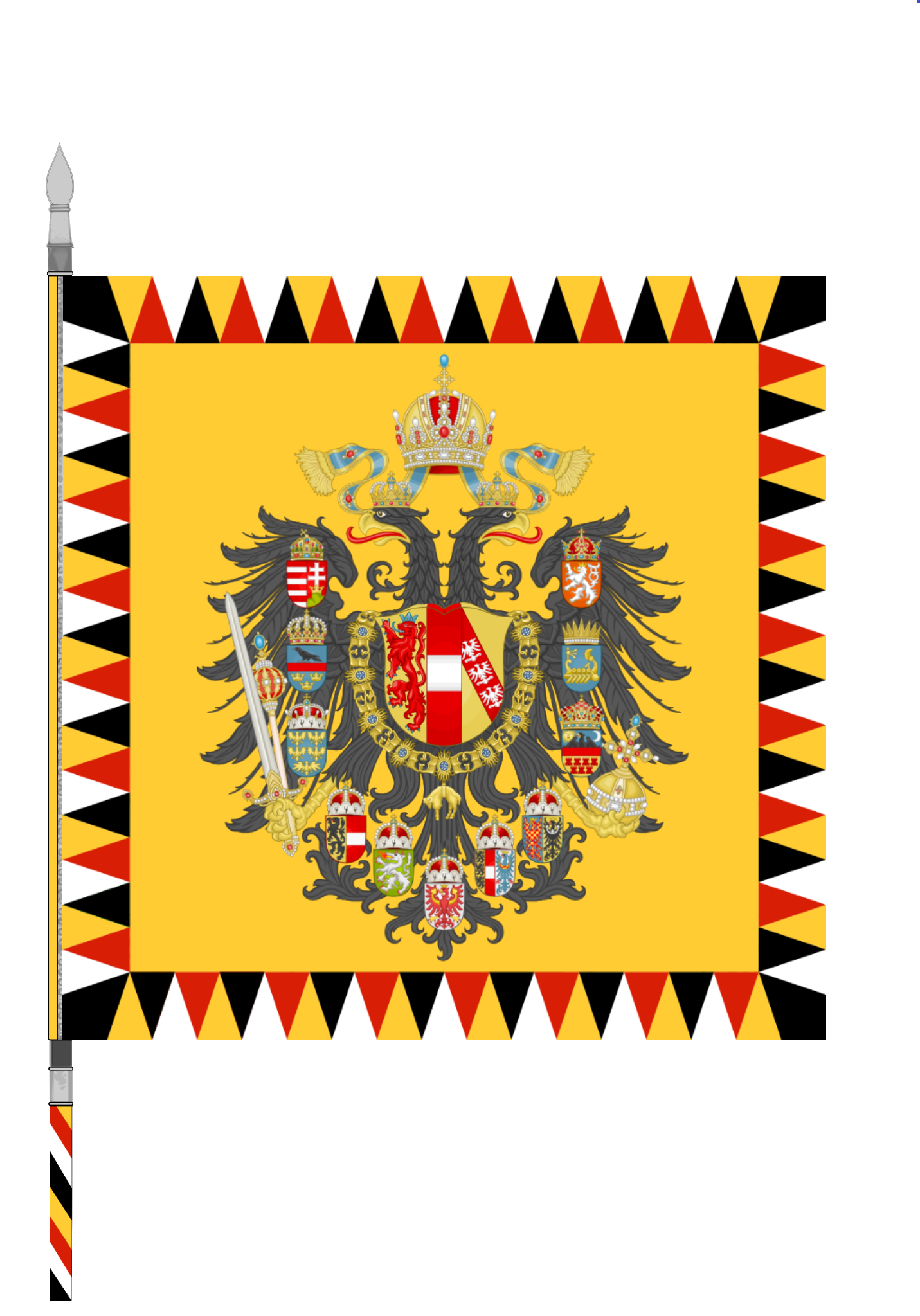
Regimental Standard of the 44th Infantry Division

The regiment is best known today for its presence in popular culture, particularly in films and military marches inspired by IR 4. It is especially associated with the Deutschmeister-Regimentsmarsch composed by Wilhelm August Jurek, with other works such as the Hoch- und Deutschmeister-Marsch by Dominik Ertl also being notable. Films featuring or inspired by the regiment include Spring Parade (1934) and most notably, Die Deutschmeister (1955).

After World War I and the subsequent disbandment of the regiment, ending a continuous legacy of nearly 223 years, its traditions were soon carried on by the First Austrian Republic through the 4th Infantry Regiment of the new Bundesheer, which bore the honorary title "Hoch- und Deutschmeister." After the Anschluss, the regiment was disbanded once again and absorbed into the Wehrmacht.

Following the destruction of the 6th Army in Stalingrad, the Austrian 44th Infantry Division was rebuilt into the Reichsgrenadier-Division "Hoch- und Deutschmeister", with the 3rd Battalion of the 134th Grenadier Regiment being one of the few units in the German Wehrmacht to fly a separate flag. It was modeled after the regimental flag of the former Austro-Hungarian Army.

Icon of the Vienna 1st Jäger Battalion "Hoch- und Deutschmeister"

After World War II and the reestablishment of Austria, Landwehrstammregiment 21, and later Jägerregiment 2 of the 2nd Jäger Brigade, continued the traditions of the Deutschmeister until the latter's disbandment.

In 2006, the Vienna 1st Jäger Battalion "Hoch- und Deutschmeister" was formed from the 4th and 6th Jäger Battalions of the former Vienna Jäger Regiment as one of Vienna's two militia battalions. It thus continues the tradition of the Vienna House Regiment up to the present day.

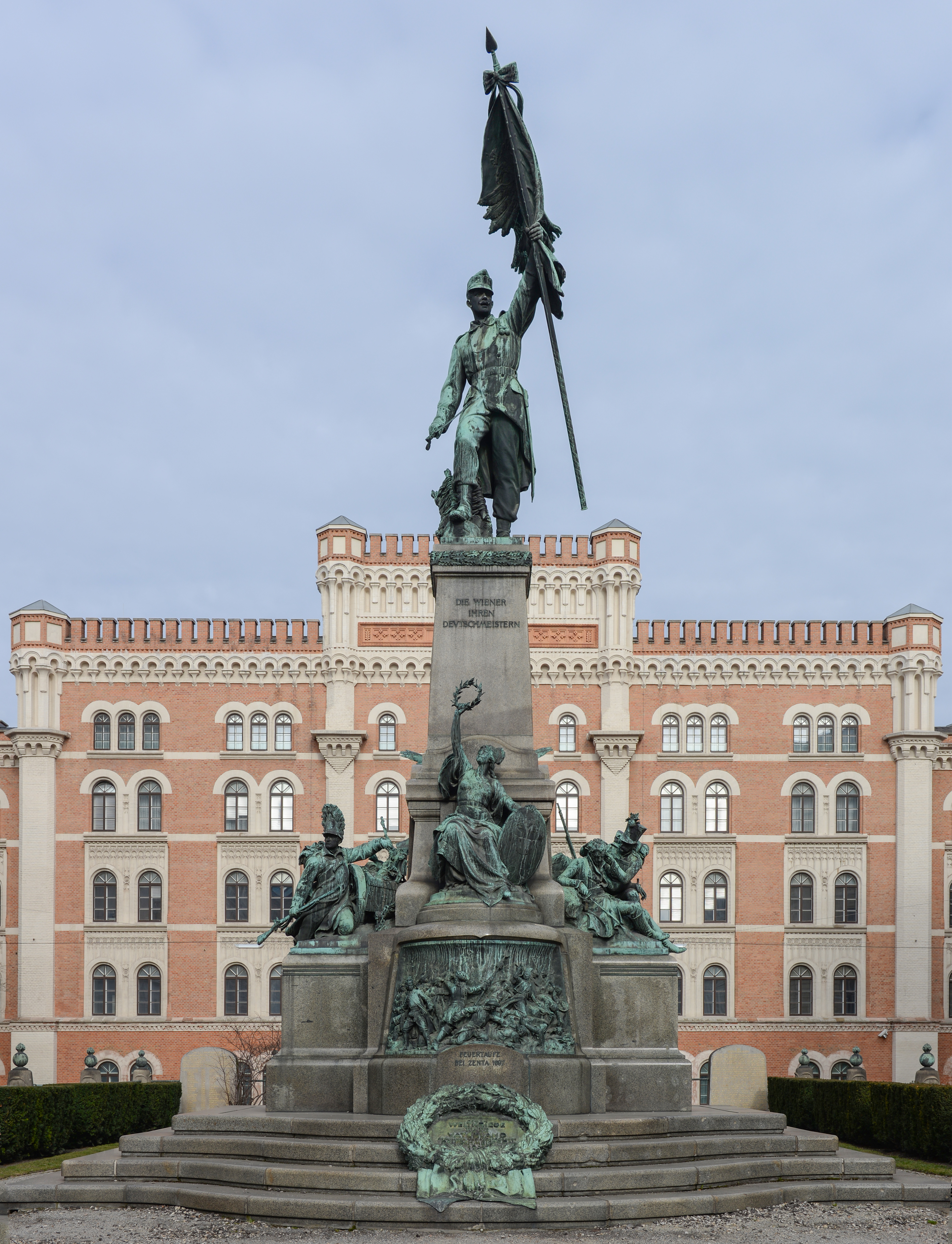
Deutschmeister Memorial in Vienna, Innere Stadt (1st District)

=== Deutschmeisterplatz ===
In 1876, Deutschmeisterplatz in Vienna's Innere Stadt (1st District) was named after the regiment. On the occasion of the regiment's 200th anniversary in 1896, the Deutschmeister Memorial was donated to this square.

Johannes Benk designed it, and it was unveiled on September 29, 1906.

In designing the monument, Benk drew primarily on the Austro-Ottoman Wars, the Seven Years' War, and the French Revolutionary and Napoleonic Wars, while also incorporating other elements from the regiment's history.

The front of the monument features a relief depicting the "Baptism of Fire at Zenta in 1697", and the back depicts "Count Soro at Kolin in 1757".

==== Deutschmeister-Regimentsmarsch ====
The Deutschmeister-Regimentsmarsch (sometimes Deutschmeistermarsch) is a military march composed in 1893 and is the best-known composition by the Austrian Wilhelm August Jurek. To this day, the Deutschmeister-Regimentsmarsch remains one of the most popular military marches and is part of the standard repertoire of many military and civilian bands. It should not be confused with the Hoch- und Deutschmeister-Marsch by Dominik Ertl.

The film Die Deutschmeister, starring Romy Schneider, focuses on the origins of the Deutschmeister-Regimentsmarsch and is its main inspiration. The lyrics sung in the film differ from Jurek's original text in a few places.

The song is sung in the Austro-Bavarian dialect, which is traditionally spoken throughout Austria, rather than Low German. The modern shortened version differs from the original 1893 version, containing only one stanza instead of three and distancing itself from the monarchy.

==== Modern Version ====
German lyrics
Literal translation
Only stanza

Mir san vom vierten Regiment,
gebor'n san mir in Wean!
Wir haben unser Vaterland und unsre Stadt so gern!
Und fangens wo mit Österreich zum Kriegführ'n amal an,
So haut a jeder von uns drein, so viel er dreinhaun kann.
Die Schlacht, zum Beispiel bei Kolin,
wie's jeder wissen dhuat
Beweist doch gleich,
was all's im Stand is echtes Weanabluat.
Und so wia's die vor uns hab'n g'macht,
so kämpfen wir auch heut'
Und geb'n 'n letzten Tropfen Bluat
für's Vaterland voll Freud!

Refrain:
Mir san vom k.und k. Infantrie-Regiment Hoch- und Deutschmeister Nummero 4
Mir san vom k.und k. Infantrie-Regiment Hoch- und Deutschmeister Nummero 4
Mir san vom k.und k. Infantrie-Regiment Hoch- und Deutschmeister Nummero 4
Mir san vom k.und k. Infantrie-Regiment Hoch- und Deutschmeister Nummero 4

We are from the fourth regiment,
we were born in Vienna!
We love our fatherland and our city so much!
And if anyone starts to wage a war with Austria
Then each one of us hits as much as he can hit.
For example, the battle of Kolin,
as everybody knows,
proves right away
what real Viennese blood is capable of.
And just as those before us did,
so we fight today
And give the last drop of blood
for the fatherland full of joy!

Refrain:
We are from the k.u. k. Infantry Regiment Hoch and Deutschmeister number 4
We are from the k.u. k. Infantry Regiment Hoch and Deutschmeister number 4
We are from the k.u. k. Infantry Regiment Hoch and Deutschmeister number 4
We are from the k.u. k. Infantry Regiment Hoch and Deutschmeister number 4

==== Original Version ====
German lyrics
Literal translation
First stanza

Mir san vom vierten Regiment,
gebor'n san mir in Wean!
Wir hab'n unser liab's Vaterland und unsern Kaiser gern!
Und fangens wo mit Österreich zum Kriegführ'n amal an,
So haut a jeder von uns drein, so viel er dreinhaun kann.
Die Schlacht, zum Beispiel bei Kolin,
wie's jeder wissen dhuat
Beweist doch gleich,
was all's im Stand is's Weanabluat.
Und so wia's die vor uns hab'n g'macht,
so kämpfen wir auch heut'
Und geb'n 'n letzten Tropfen Bluat
für's Vaterland voll Freud!

Refrain:
Mir san vom k.und k. Infantrie-Regiment Hoch- und Deutschmeister Nummero 4

We are from the fourth regiment,
we were born in Vienna!
We love our fatherland and our emperor so much!
And if anyone starts to wage a war with Austria
Then each one of us hits as much as he can hit.
For example, the battle of Kolin,
as everybody knows,
proves right away
what Viennese blood is capable of.
And just as those before us did,
so we fight today
And give the last drop of blood
for the fatherland full of joy!

Refrain:
We are from the k.u. k. Infantry Regiment Hoch and Deutschmeister number 4

Second stanza

Im Frieden jetzt da geht's uns gut
san immer voll Hamur
Und müss' mir a im Sommer oft sehr zeitlich in der Fruh
Von unsern Strohsack h'runter steig'n,
das kann uns nix genier'n,
Denn kaum, dass mir recht munter san,
schon unser'n "Schwarzen" krieg'n.
Is a der Übungsmarsch sehr gross,
fühl'n mir ka Müdigkeit,
Weil stets bei unser'n Regiment is da zum Zeitvertreib
A Mann in jeden Zug ganz g'wiss,
fühl'n mir ka Müdigkeit,
der in der "unter'n" Lad
Zum Lachen und zum Weinen
oft a Menge G'spass d'rinn hat.

Refrain:
Mir san vom k.und k. Infantrie-Regiment Hoch- und Deutschmeister Nummero 4

In peace now, there it goes well for us
are always quite full of humor
And must we also in summer often very early in the morning
From our straw sack down climb,
that can us nothing bother,
For hardly that we quite lively are,
already our "Black one" get.
Also is the drill march very big,
feel we no tiredness,
Because always with our regiment there is for pastime
A man in every squad quite surely,
feel we no tiredness,
who in the "lower" drawer
For laughing and for crying
often a lot of fun inside there he has.

Refrain:
We are from the k.u. k. Infantry Regiment Hoch and Deutschmeister number 4

Third stanza

Und an an Sonntag Nachmittag in der Extra- Montur,
Im Sack unser'n Erlaubnisschein bis sieb'ne in der Fruah,
Im Arm a Maderl, wie a Fee, so lieb und wunderschön,
So können s'uns von Numm'ro vier
beim Heurig'n draussen seh'n!
Doch wenn wir amal älter san und unser'n Abschied hab'n,
So sag'n wir jedem voller Stolz,
wir war'n bei d'Edelknab'n,
Hab'n treu und brav
in Kaisers Rock gedient für's Vaterland
Und hab'n dem vierten Regiment
gar niemals g'macht a Schand!

Refrain:
Mir san vom k.und k. Infantrie-Regiment Hoch- und Deutschmeister Nummero 4

And on a Sunday afternoon in the extra uniform,
In the pocket our permission slip until seven in the morning,
In the arm a girl, like a fairy, so lovely and beautiful,
So can they us from number four
at the wine tavern outside see!
But when we once older are and our discharge have,
So say we to everyone full of pride,
we were with the noble lads,
Have faithfully and well
in emperor's coat served for the fatherland
And have the fourth regiment
indeed never made a disgrace!

Refrain:
We are from the k.u. k. Infantry Regiment Hoch and Deutschmeister number 4

==== Deutschmeisterbund ====
Former members of the regiment and its successor or traditional units from the First Republic, as well as the Deutschmeister associations that follow the regiment's tradition, are called Deutschmeister. Some of these associations have existed since the late 19th century and are united in the Deutschmeisterbund under the patronage of the Grand Master of the Teutonic Order.

This umbrella organisation was founded in 1986 and is headquartered in Vienna. A similar umbrella organization with the same name and headquarters already existed from 1919 to 1945 and from 1956 to 1974.

List of member associations in Austria are:

- Original Hoch- und Deutschmeister
- Verein Hoch- und Deutschmeister IR 4
- Deutschmeister Schützenkorps
- k. u. k. Wiener Regimentskapelle IR4
- Kameradschaft der Angehörigen der ehem. 2. Division des österr. Bundesheeres
- Kameradschaft der 44. Infanterie-Division Hoch- u. Deutschmeister
- Verein der Freunde des Jägerbataillons WIEN 1 "Hoch- und Deutschmeister"
- Deutschmeister 1809 Infanterieregiment No. 4 in Perchtoldsdorf

In Germany:

- Historische Deutschorden-Compagnie zu Mergentheim e.V.
- Deutschordens-Kapelle Ellingen e.V.
- Freundeskreis Hoch- und Deutschmeister Mannheim (Left in 2010)

The Deutschmeister meet annually on St. George's Day at the former residence of their patron in Bad Mergentheim. They still share the colour light blue today, the regiment's historic insignia colour. It still appears in the Deutschmeisterbund's emblem, as well as in its decorations and traditional uniforms.

The Deutschmeisterbund maintains contact with the regiment's tradition bearer in the Austrian Armed Forces and with the Teutonic Order, and publishes the "Deutschmeisterjournal" along with other publications on an irregular basis. In addition, it awards the four-tiered "Decoration of the Deutschmeisterbund" for special services to the Deutschmeister tradition; although not a state decoration, it is authorised by the Austrian Ministry of Defence for wear on the uniform.

==== List of notable songs ====
Work	Composer	Year	Recordings
Deutschmeister-Regimentsmarsch	Wilhelm August Jurek	1893	Piano Version 1930's Recording
Hoch- und Deutschmeister-Marsch	Dominik Ertl	1885	
Deutschmeister-Jubiläums-Marsch	Johann Strauss II	1896	
Deutschmeister-Reservistenmarsch	Wilhelm August Jurek	Unknown	
Deutschmeistergruß-Polka	Dominik Ertl	Unknown	
Deutschmeister-Marsch	Josef Bayer	Unknown	
Deutschmeister-Denkmal-Marsch	Wilhelm Wacek	~1893	
Marsch vom k.k. Infanterie Regiment Teutschmeister	Unknown	~1750	
Pfalz Neuburg Teutschmeister Marsch	Johann Nepomuk Fuchs	Unknown	

== Name history ==
- 1696 Pfalz-Neuburg-Teutschmeister zu Fuß (Palatinate-Neuburg-Teutschmeister on Foot)
- ~1700 Teutschmeister zu Fuß (Teutschmeister on Foot)
- 1718 Infanterie-Regiment "Deutschmeister" (Infantry Regiment "Deutschmeister")
- 1769 Infanterie-Regiment "Deutschmeister" Nr.4 (4th Infantry Regiment "Deutschmeister")
- 1798 Linien-Infanterie-Regiment Deutschmeister Nr.4 (4th Line infantry Regiment "Deutschmeister")
- 1804 k.k. Linien-Infanterie-Regiment "Deutschmeister" Nr.4 (4th k.k. Line Infantry Regiment "Deutschmeister")
- 1814 k.k. Linien-Infanterie-Regiment "Hoch- und Deutschmeister" Nr.4 (4th k.k. Line Infantry Regiment "Hoch and Deutschmeister")
- 1873 k.k. Infanterie-Regiment "Hoch- und Deutschmeister" Nr. 4 (4th k.k. Infantry Regiment "Deutschmeister")
- 1889 k.u.k. Infanterie-Regiment "Hoch- und Deutschmeister" Nr. 4 (4th k.u.k. Infantry Regiment "Deutschmeister")
- 1915 k.u.k. Infanterie-Regiment Nr. 4 (4th k.u.k. Infantry Regiment)

== Proprietors (Inhaber) ==
- 1696 Francis Louis of Palatinate-Neuburg
- 1731 Clemens August of Bavaria
- 1761 Prince Charles Alexander of Lorraine
- 1780 Archduke Maximilian Francis of Austria
- 1801 Archduke Charles, Duke of Teschen
- 1805 Archduke Anton Victor of Austria
- 1863 Archduke Wilhelm Franz of Austria
- 1894 Archduke Eugen of Austria

== Regimental Commanders ==
1696 Obristlieutenant Graf Damian Hugo von Virmont; 1704 Obrist Freiherr Bertram Anton von Wachtendonk; 1708 Obrist Freiherr Damian Casimir von Dalberg; 1717 Obrist Graf Johann von O'Nelly; 1734 Obrist Freiherr Franz von Glaubitz; 1735 Obristlieutenant Alexander von MacDonell (ad interim); 1736 Obrist Freiherr Joseph von Heydorff; 1739 Obrist Anton von Colloredo-Waldsee; 1743 Obristlieutenant Freiherr Wilhelm von Lestwitz; 1750 Obrist Graf Karl von Colloredo; 1753 Obrist Freiherr Carl Ludwig von Lestwitz; 1756 Obrist Carl Mohr von Wald; 1757 Obrist Graf Franz von Callenberg; 1760 Oberst Freiherr Johann Christoph von Meichsner zu Adelshofen; 1772 Oberst Ludwig von Grafforst; 1779 Oberst Freiherr Friedrich von Lilien; 1788 Oberst Freiherr Wilhelm von Rosenberg; 1792 Oberst Freiherr Wilhelm von Kerpen; 1794 Oberst Graf Ignaz von Brandis; 1797 Oberst Carl von Brixen; 1800 Oberst Friedrich Kirchner; 1802 Oberst Philipp von Faber; 1805 Oberst Freiherr Franz von Engelhardt; 1809 Oberst Joseph von Klopstein; 1813 Oberst Freiherr Stephan von Erdmann	1824 Oberst Freiherr Ferdinand von Voith von Sterpetz; 1827 Oberst Freiherr Johann von Wöber; 1832 Oberstlieutenant Freiherr Ludwig von Fels; 1834 Oberst Fürst Carl von Schwarzenberg; 1840 Oberst Heinrich Edler von Habermann; 1848 Oberst Franz Bubna von Littiz; 1849 Oberstlieutenant Freiherr Carl von Kellner von Köllenstein; 1849 Oberstlieutenant Fürst Albert Casimir; 1854 Oberst Anton Laaba von Rosenfeld; 1854 Oberst Carl Wachter von Wachenhain; 1859 Oberst Johann Plochl; 1862 Oberst Joseph Ritter von Kolbenschlag von Reinhartstein; 1864 Oberst Johann Töply von Hohenvest; 1866 Oberst Wilhelm von Peinlich; 1866 Oberst Johann Töply von Hohenvest; 1868 Oberst Carl Bolzano Edler von Kronstädt; 1871 Oberst Ludwig Bandian; 1875 Oberst Gustav Borosini von Hohenstern; 1879 Oberst Carl Prévôt; 1881 Oberst Carl Möraus; 1884 Oberst Raimund Dorner; 1889 Oberst Joseph Ritter von Guggenberg; 1891 Oberst Johann Werner; 1896 Oberst Liborius Hausner

== Stationing Locations ==
1699 Sibiu; 1711 Khust; 1714 Aachen; 1715 Luxembourg; 1716 Brussels, then Roermond; 1718 Brussels; 1719 Ghent, Mechelen; 1720 Brussels; 1721 Ghent; 1722 Brussels; 1725 Mons; 1728 Brussels; 1730 Antwerp; 1731 Świdnica; 1733 Plzeň; 1736 Pavia; 1749 Maribor, then Klagenfurt; 1752 Mladá Boleslav; 1754 Buda; 1763 Mons; 1775 Bruck an der Leitha; 1777 Uherský Brod	1779 Vienna; 1785 Brussels; 1786 Vienna; 1791–1808 Vienna; 1808 Wiener Neustadt; 1809 Vienna; 1815 Milan; 1816 St. Pölten; 1820 Bergamo; 1821 Nocera; 1822 Naples; 1825 Capua; 1827 Casalmaggiore; 1829 Klagenfurt; 1830 Enns (St. Pölten), then Linz; 1831 Klagenfurt, then Gorizia, later Udine; 1832 Bassano del Grappa, then Verona, Bassano del Grappa; 1834 Verona, Milan; 1836 Kaiserebersdorf, then Linz; 1839 Kaiserebersdorf	1840 Vienna; 1846 Tarnów; 1847 Lviv; 1849/50 Győr, Nitra, Košice; 1851 Komárom, Győr, then Bratislava; 1853 Komárom; 1854 Vienna, then Cluj-Napoca, later in Galicia-Lodomeria; 1855 Budapest; 1858 Debrecen; 1859 Bratislava; 1862 Arad; 1863 Budapest; 1866 Völkermarkt, then Dubrovnik; 1869 Graz; 1871 Tulln an der Donau; 1879 Kotor; 1881 Innsbruck; 1882 Vienna; 1893 Jihlava; 1896–1914 Vienna

== Image Media ==
=== Regimental Standards ===
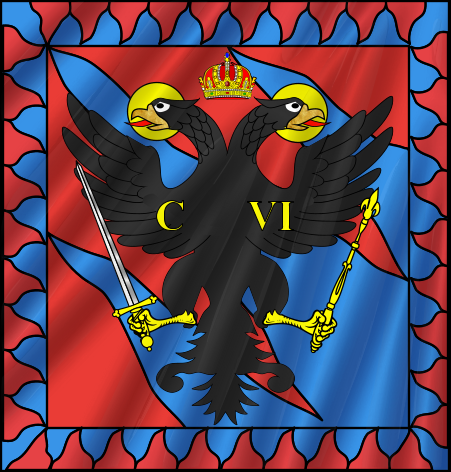
Ordinarfahne ~1740

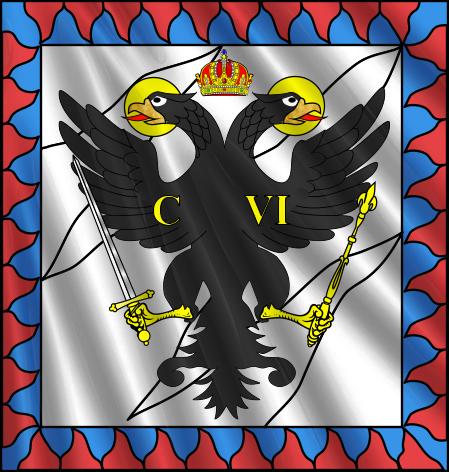
Leibfahne ~1740

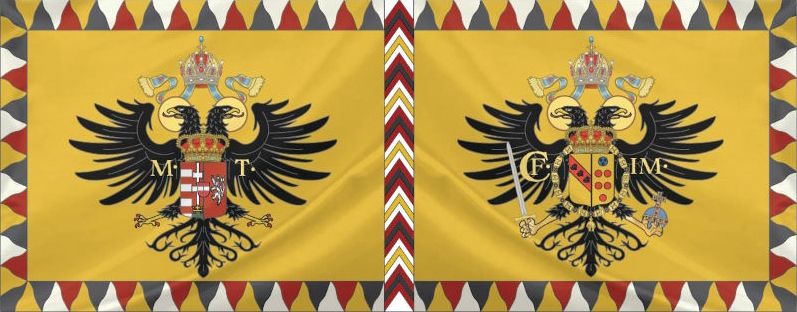
Ordinarfahnen ~1760

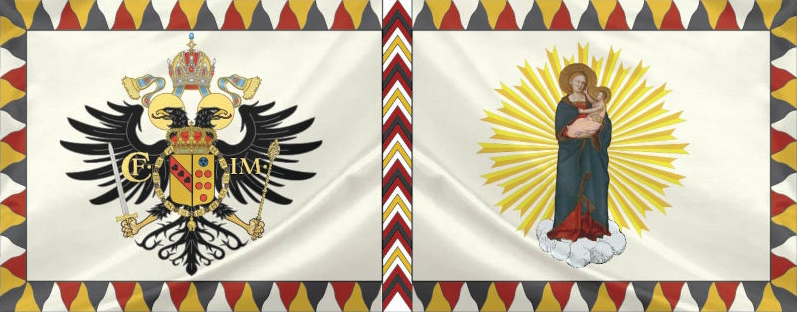
Leibfahnen ~1760

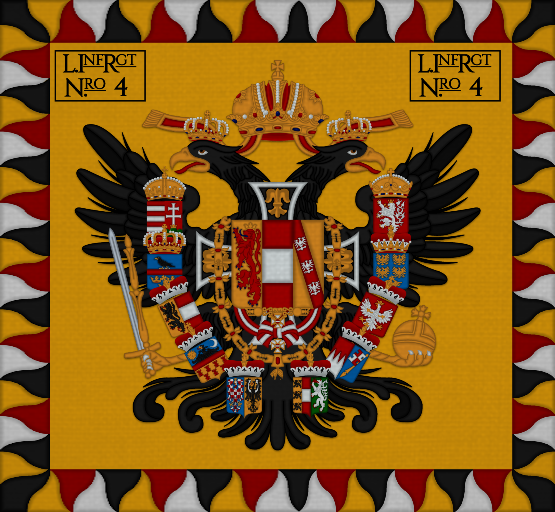
Ordinarfahne 1806

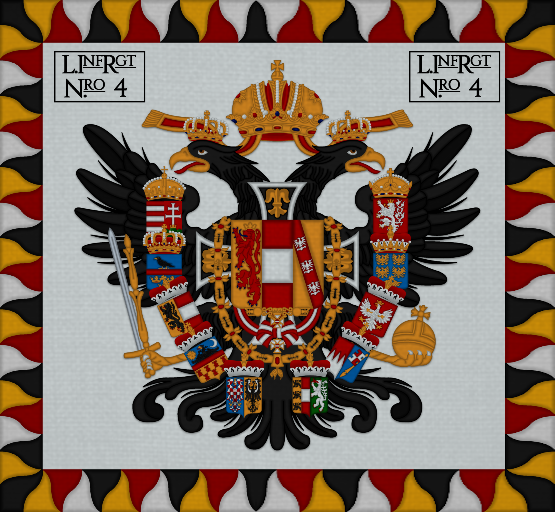
Leibfahne 1806 (Front)

Leibfahne 1806 (Back)

Regimental Standard of the 44th Infantry Division

=== Uniforms ===
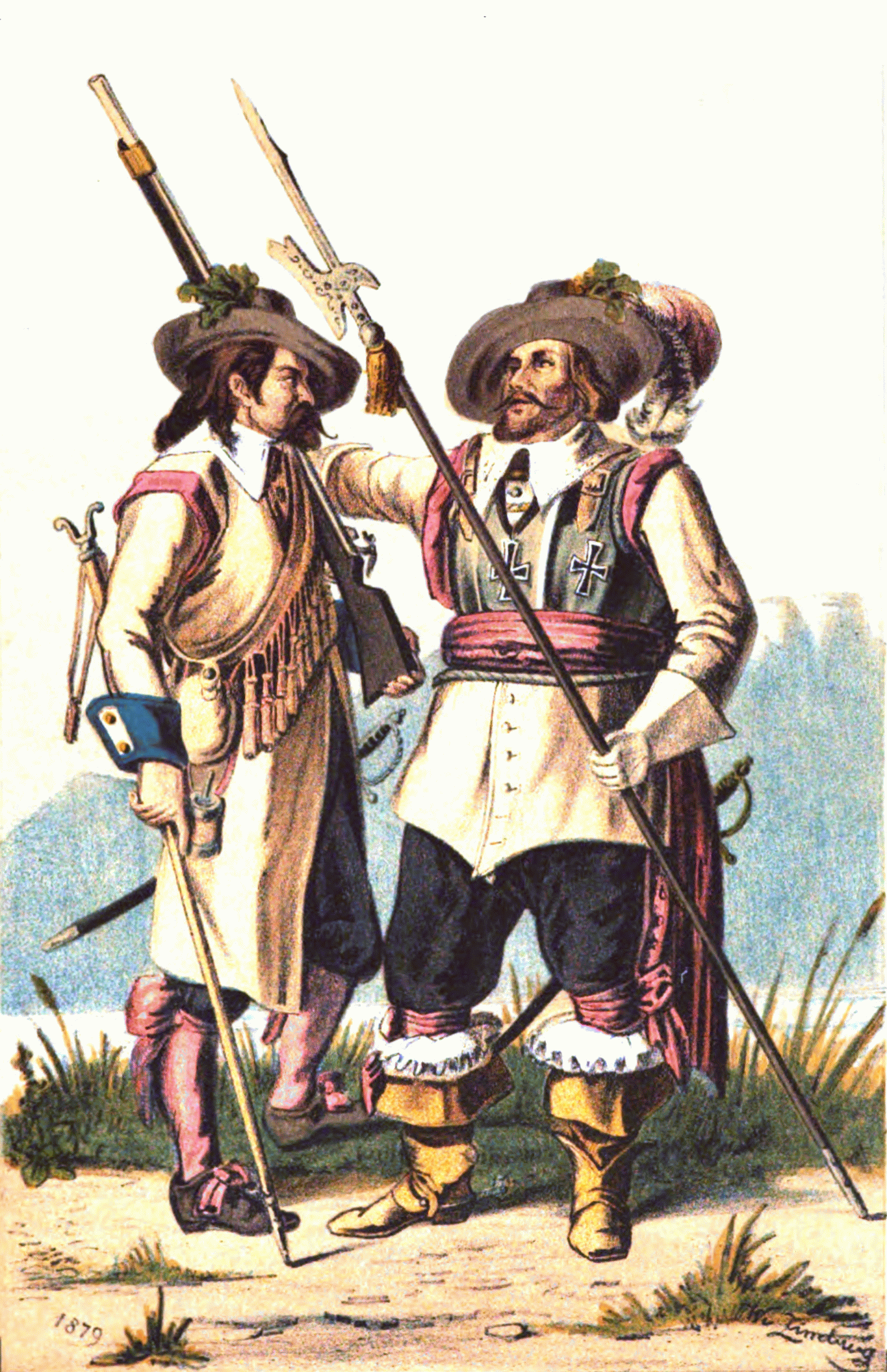
Musketeer (Left) and Hauptmann (Right) in 1696. The Hauptmann can be seen with Teutonic crosses on his uniform.

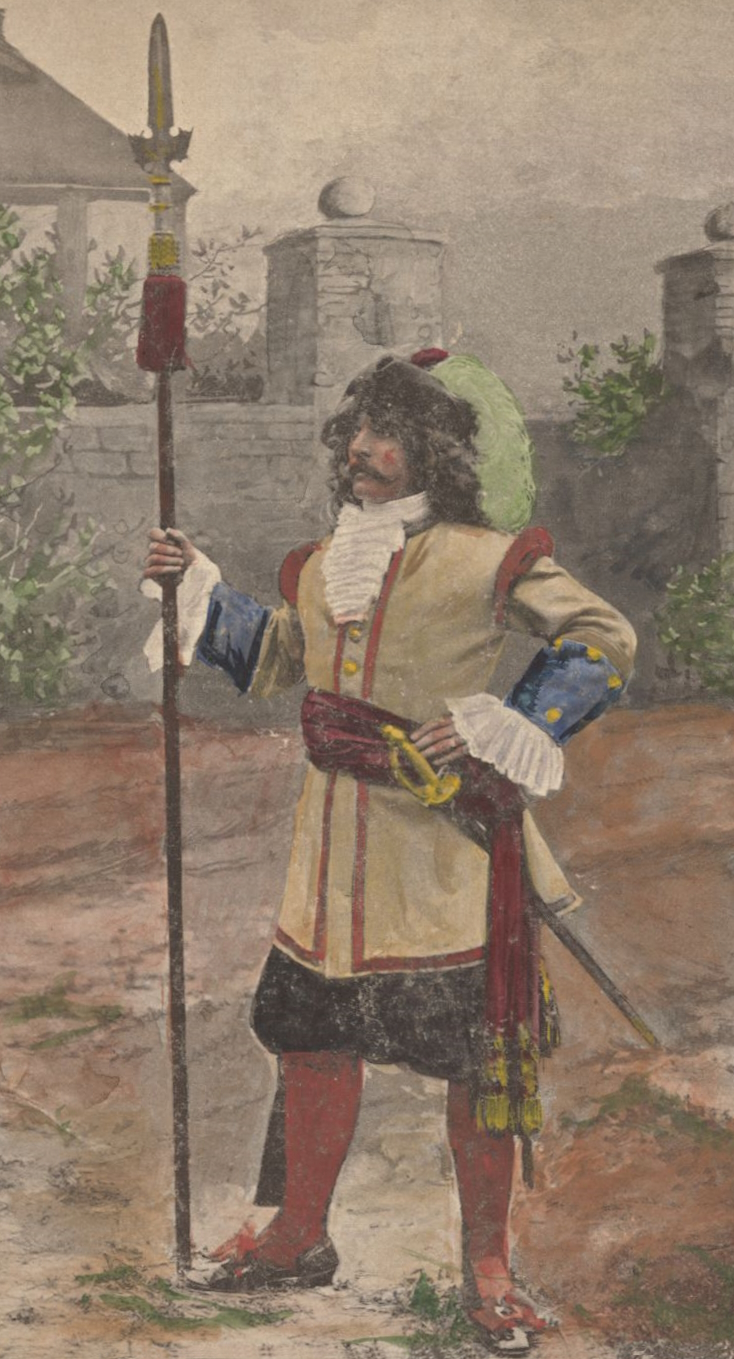
Officer (1696)

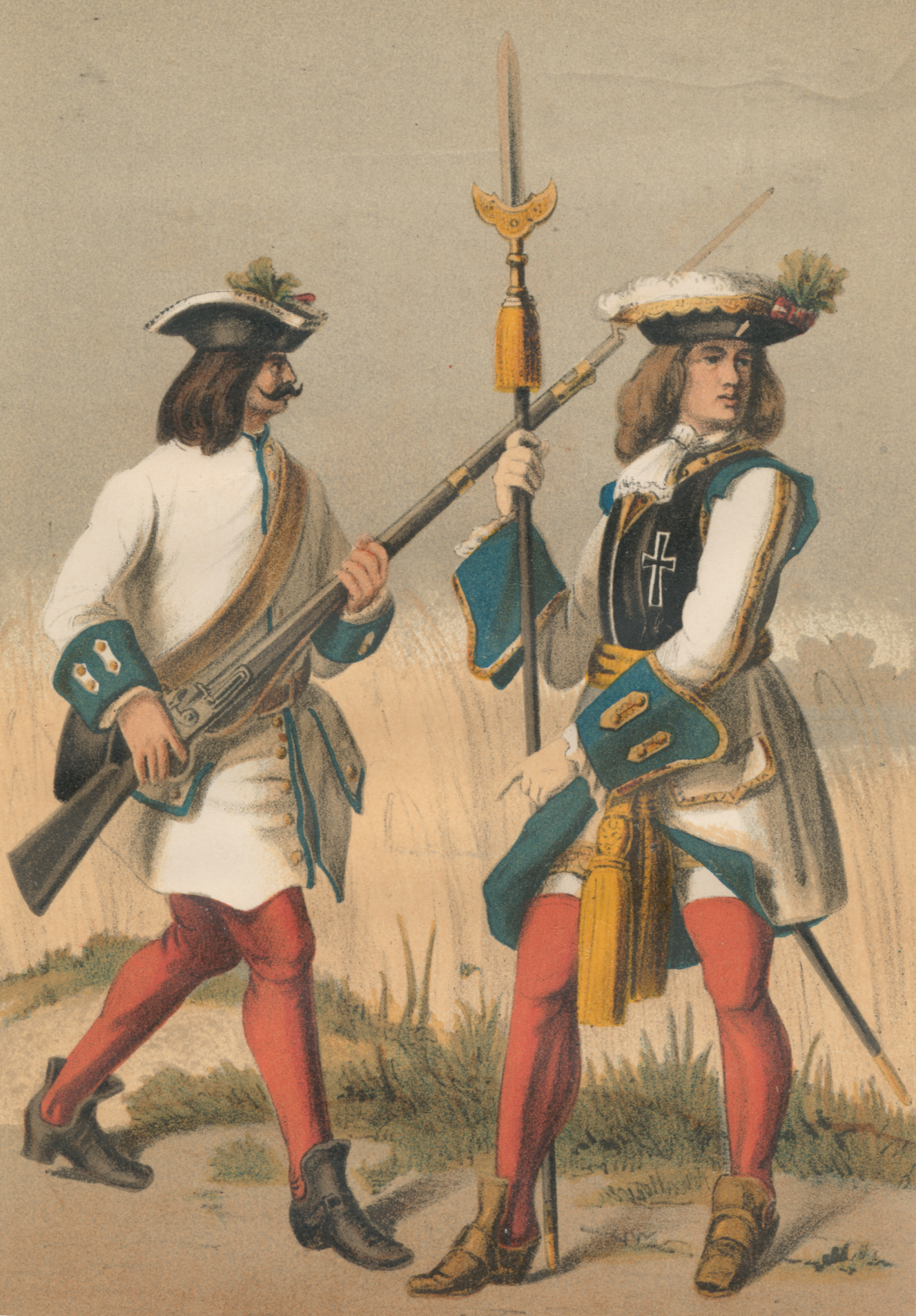
Musketeer (Left) and Oberstwachtmeister (Right) (Colonel sergeant) (1710)

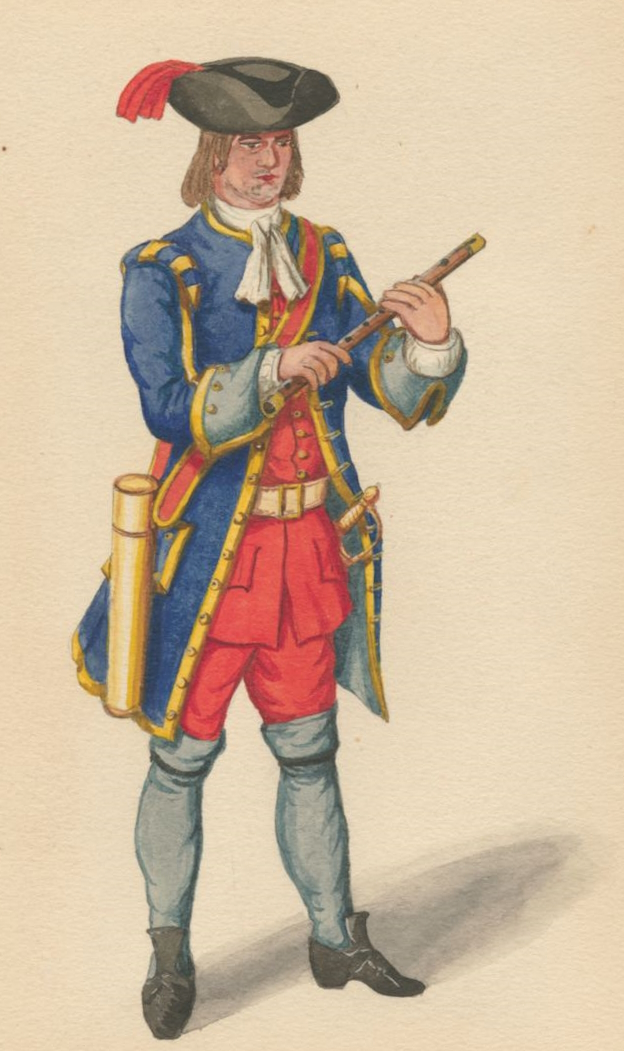
Fifer (1709)

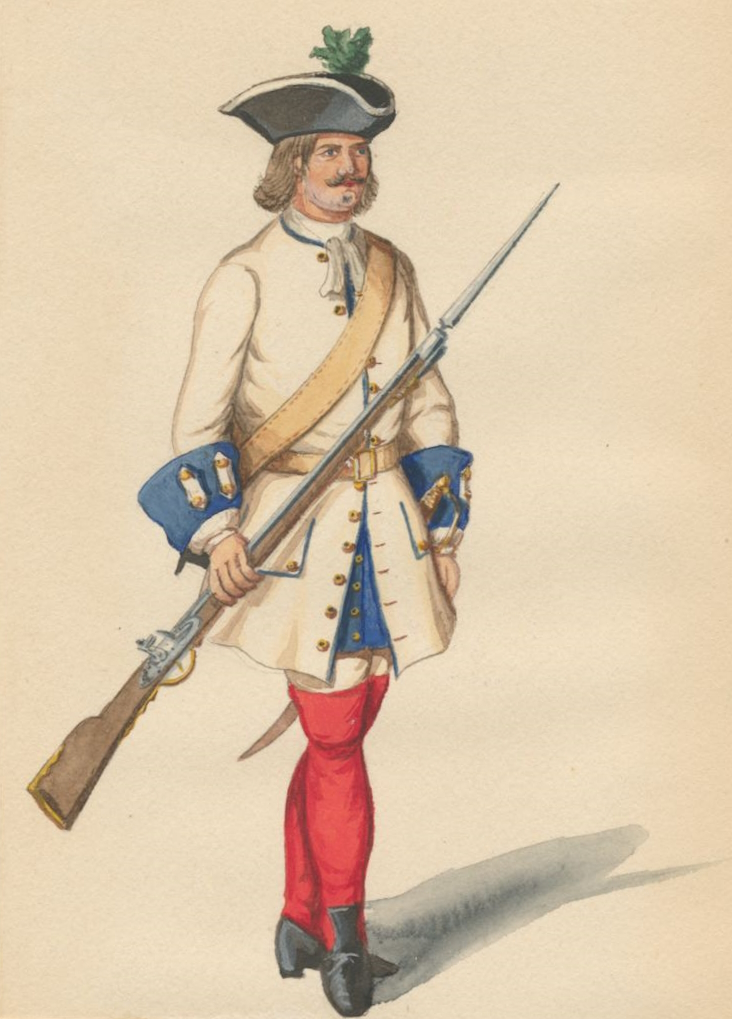
Musketeer (1710)

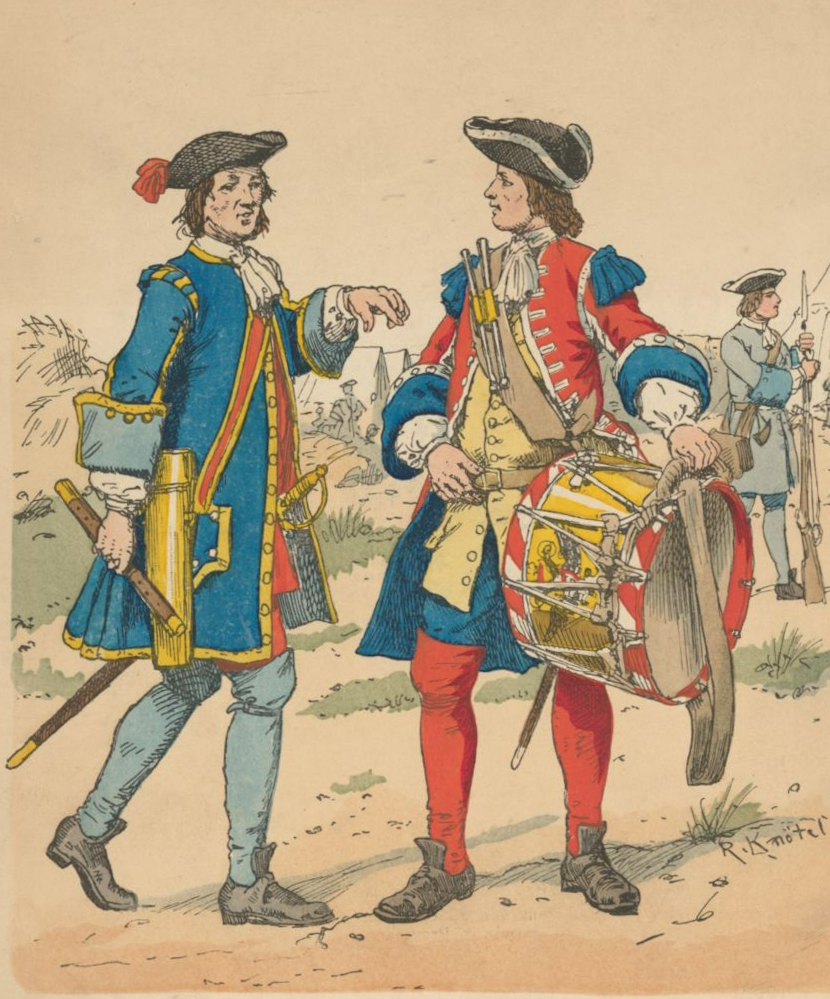
Fifer (left) and Nigrelli Drummer (right) (~1710)

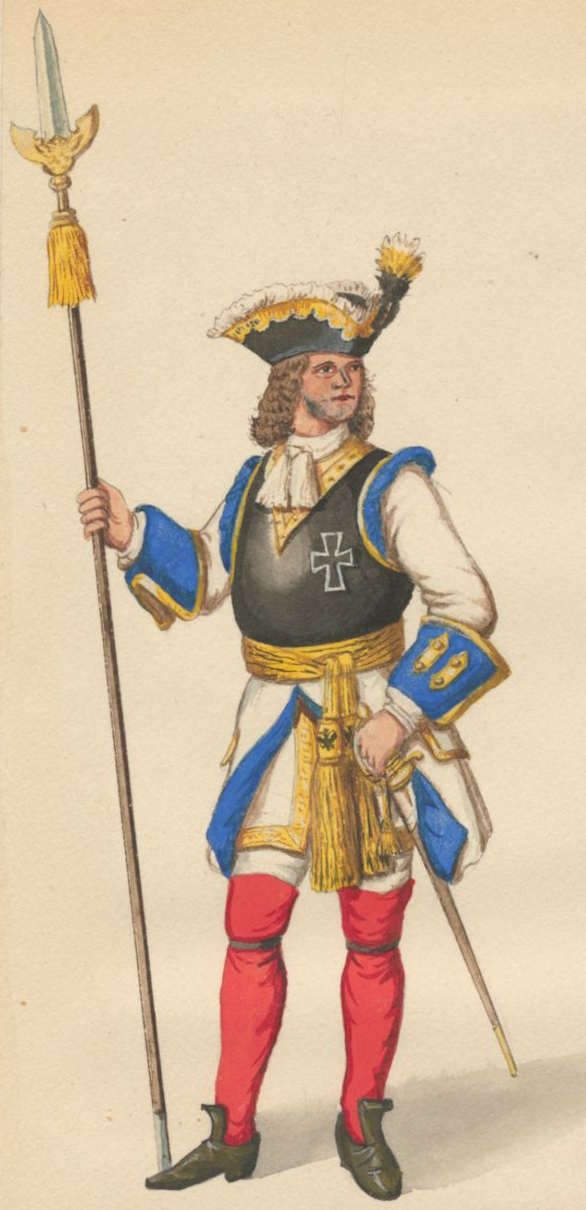
Oberstwachtmeister (1710)

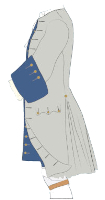
Musketeer Uniform (1710)

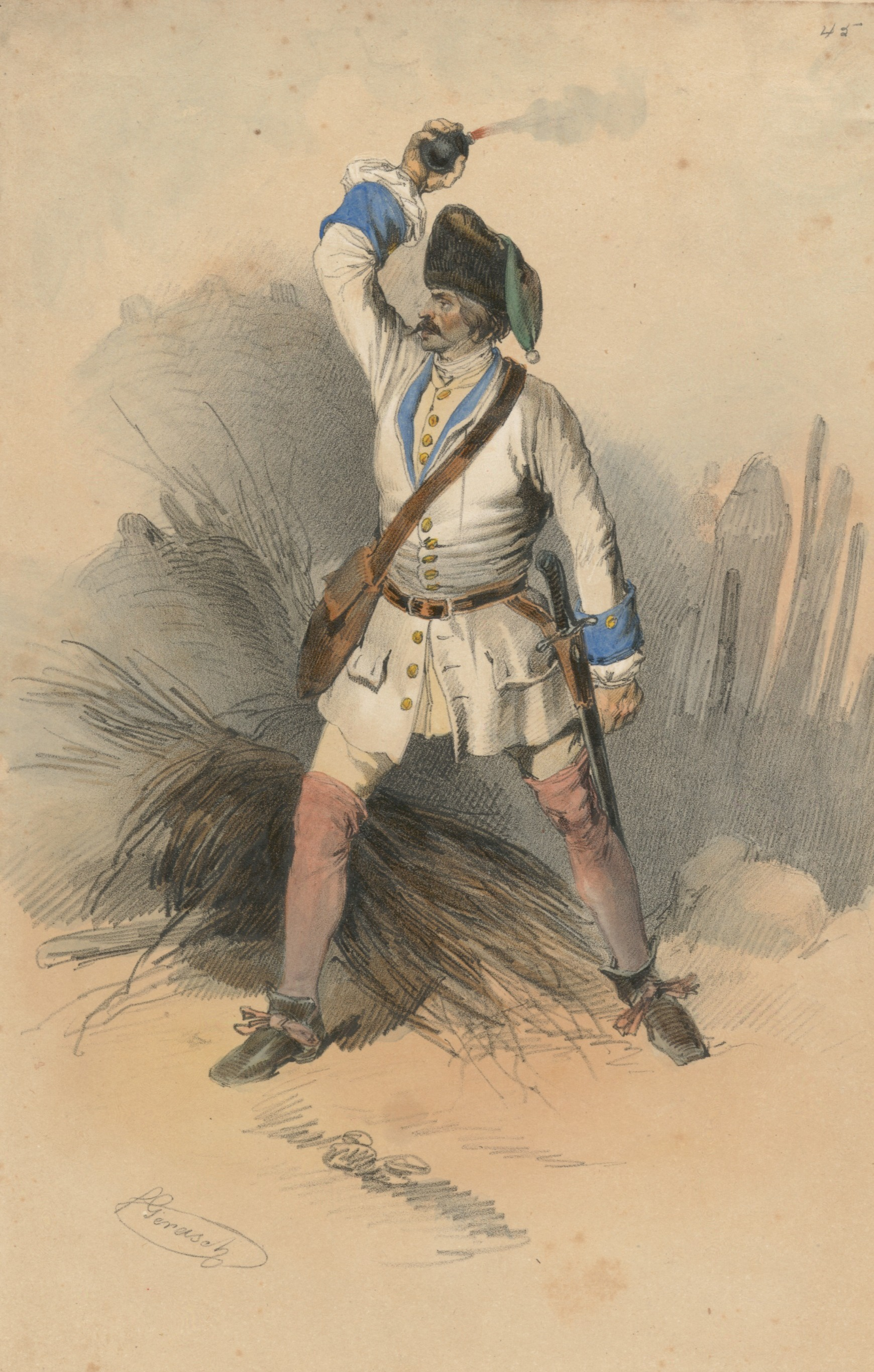
Grenadier (~1720)

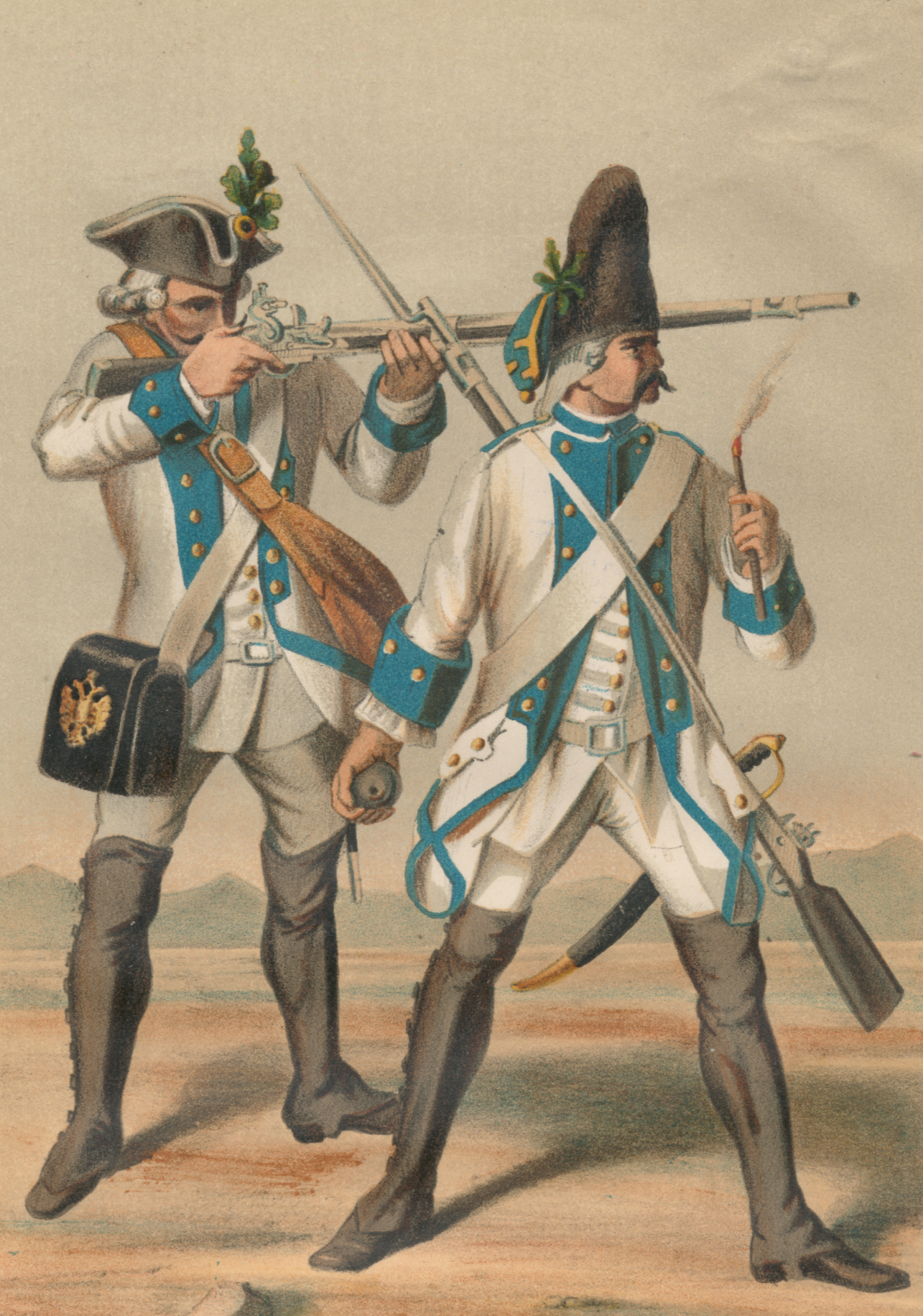
Musketeer (Left) and Grenadier (Right) (1730)

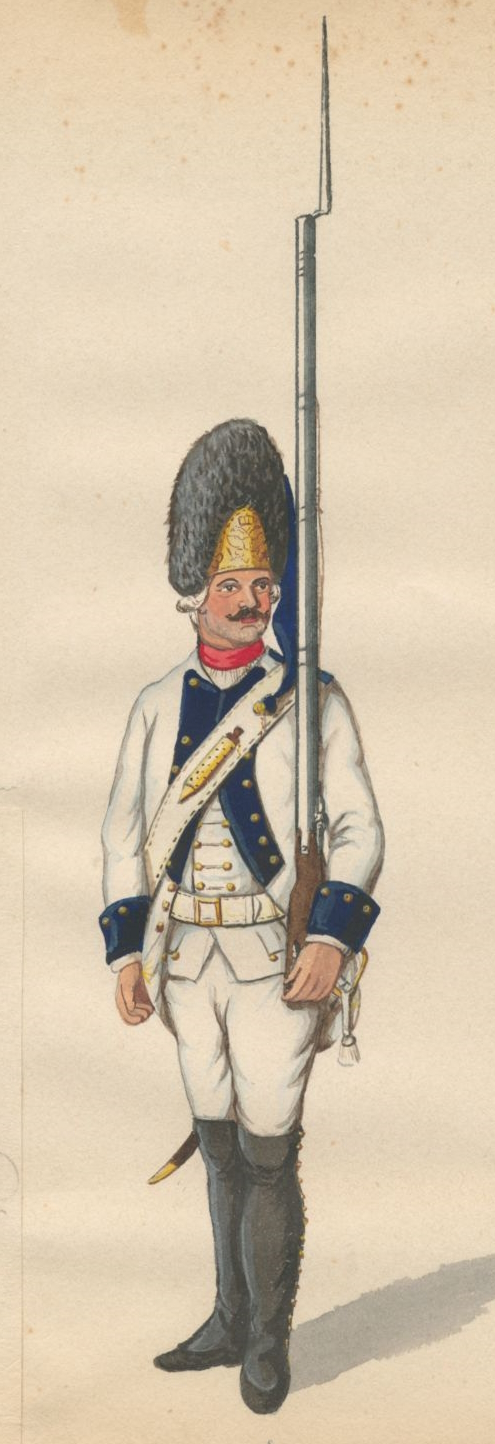
Grenadier (1756)

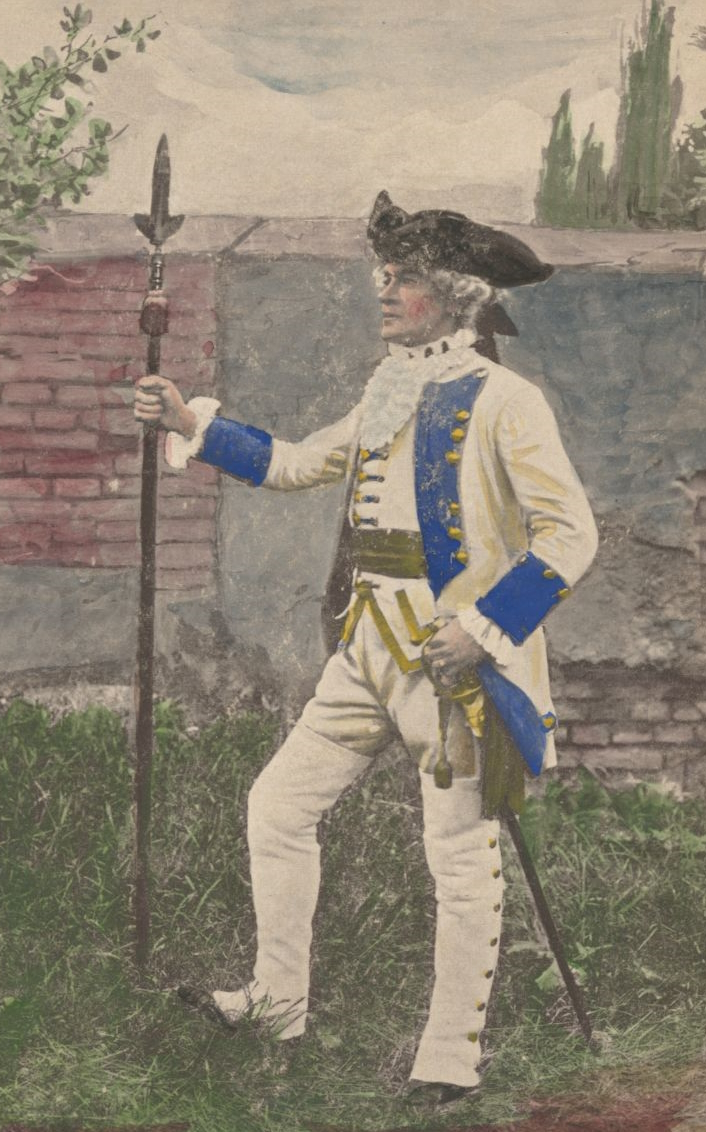
Officer (1756)

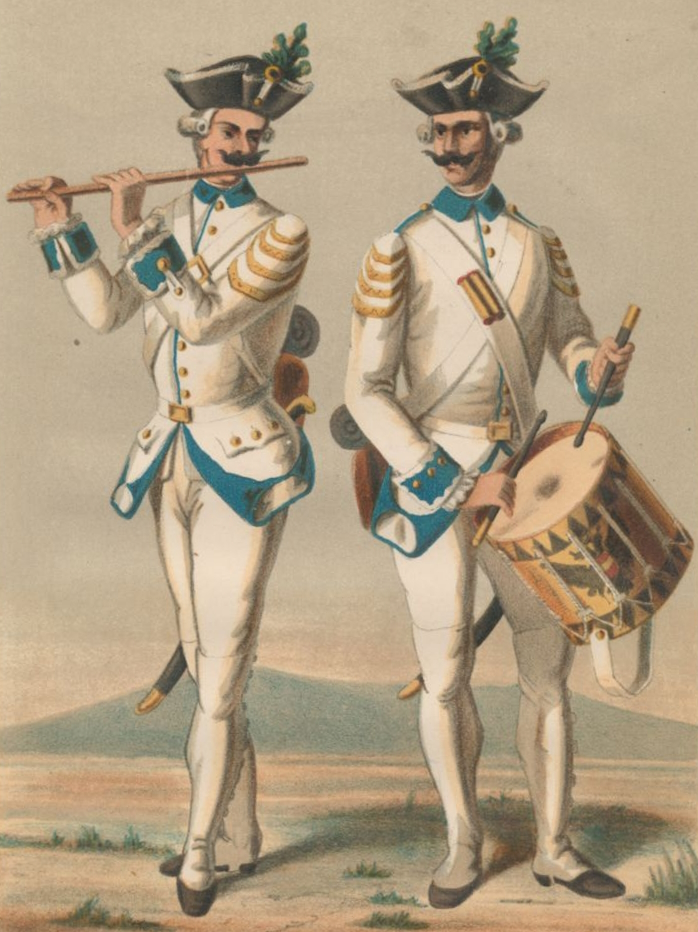
Fifer (right) and Drummer (left) (1756)

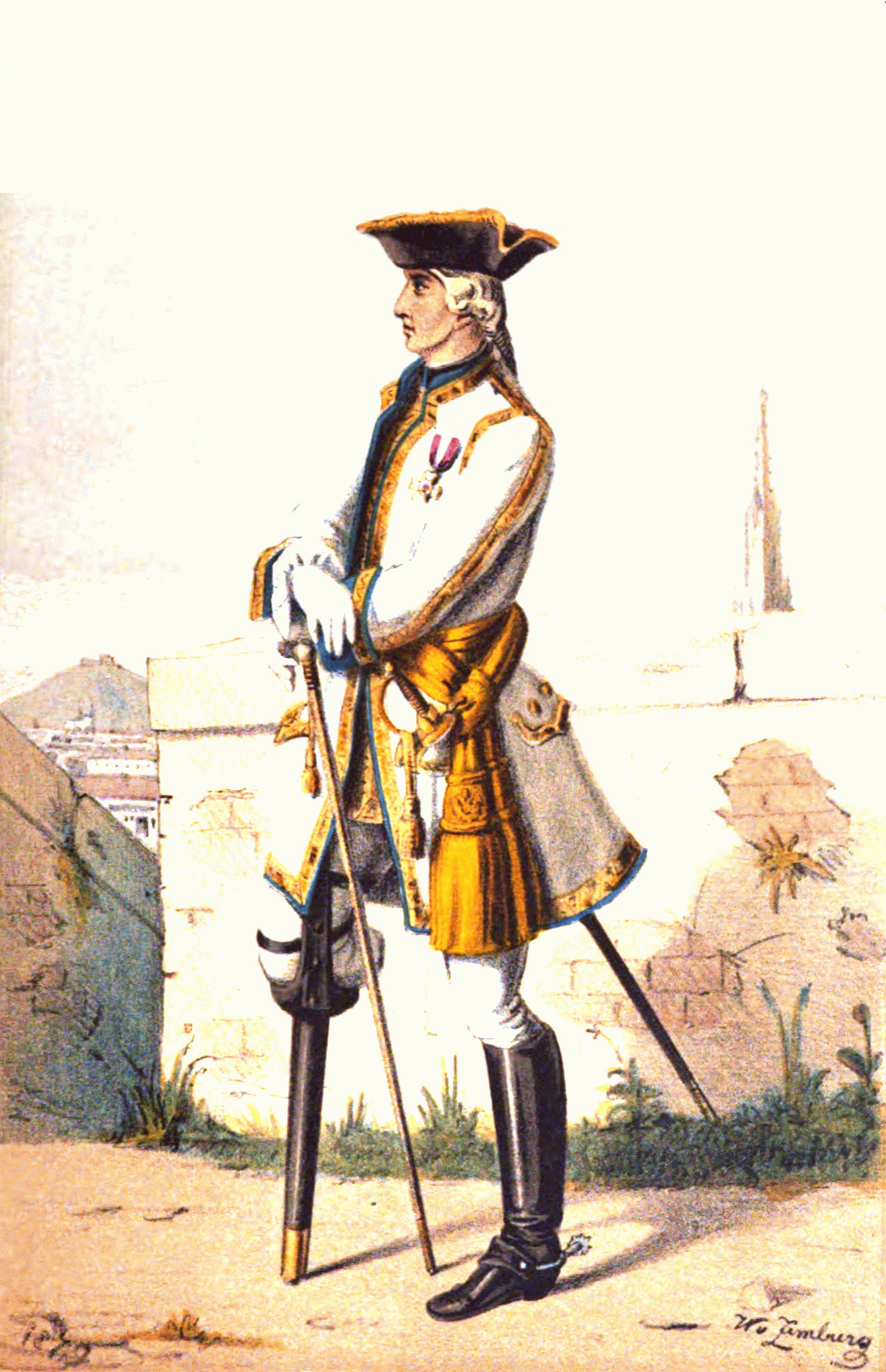
Oberstwachtmeister Johann von Soro at Kolín (1757)

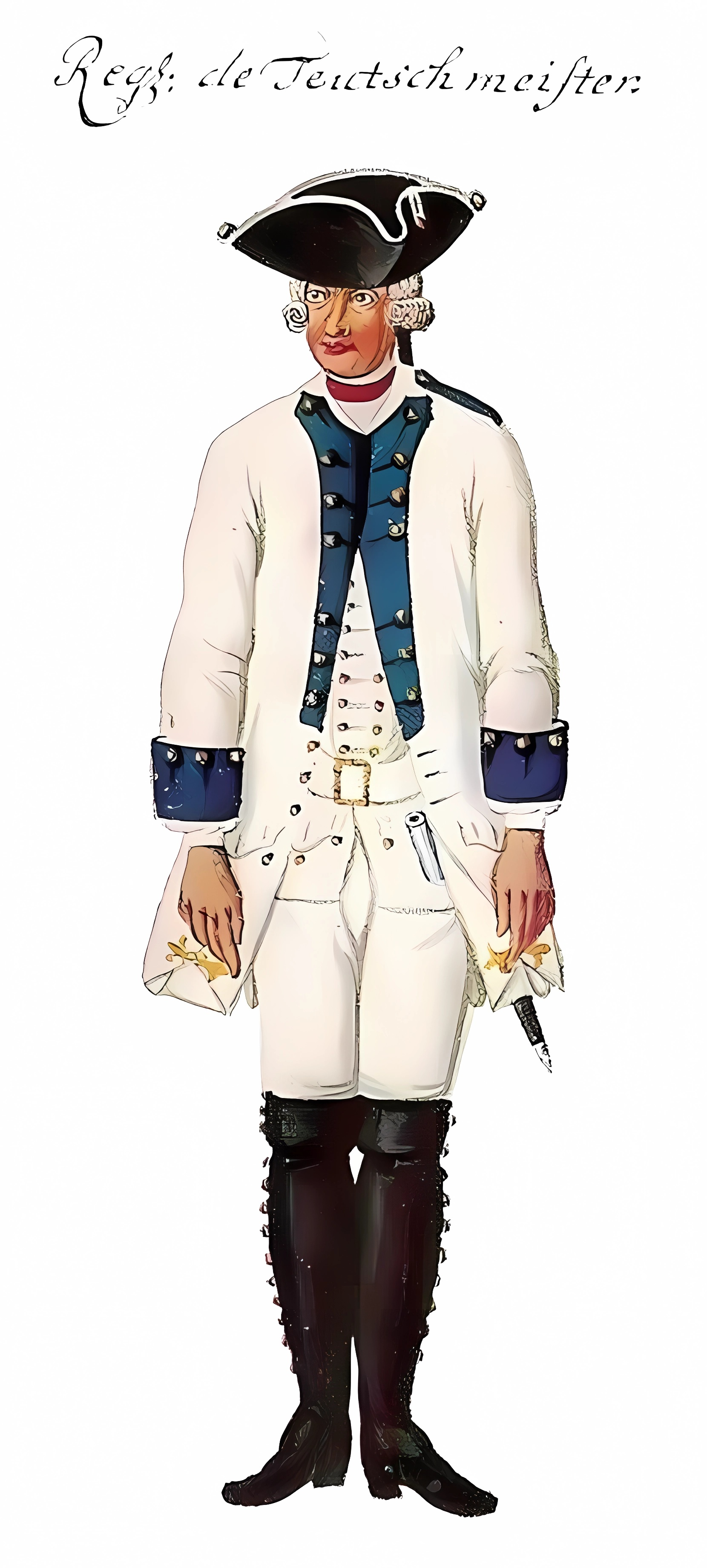
Infantry (1762)

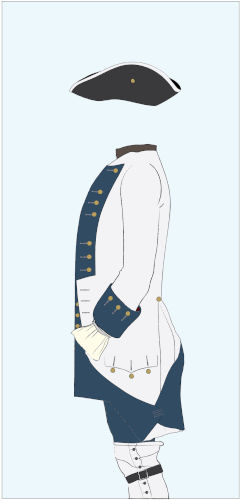
Musketeer Uniform (1757)

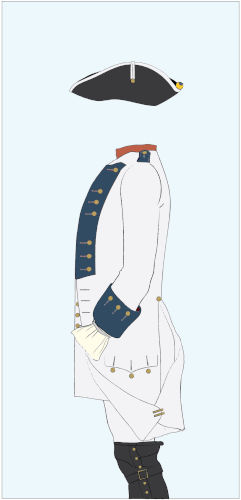
Musketeer Uniform (1762)

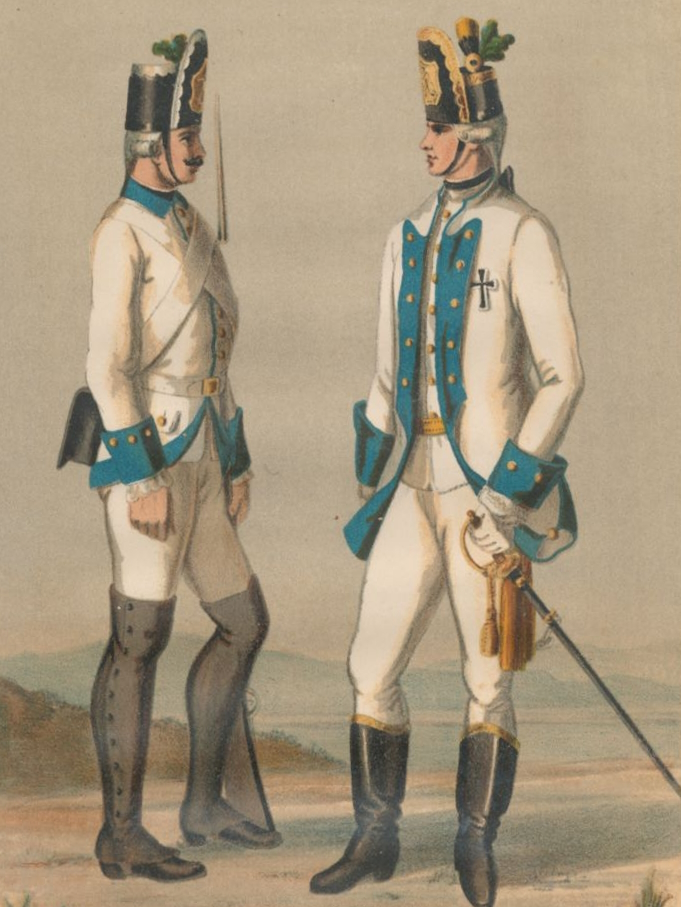
Musketeer and Officer (1776)

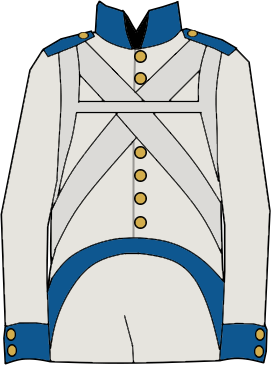
Uniform (1780)

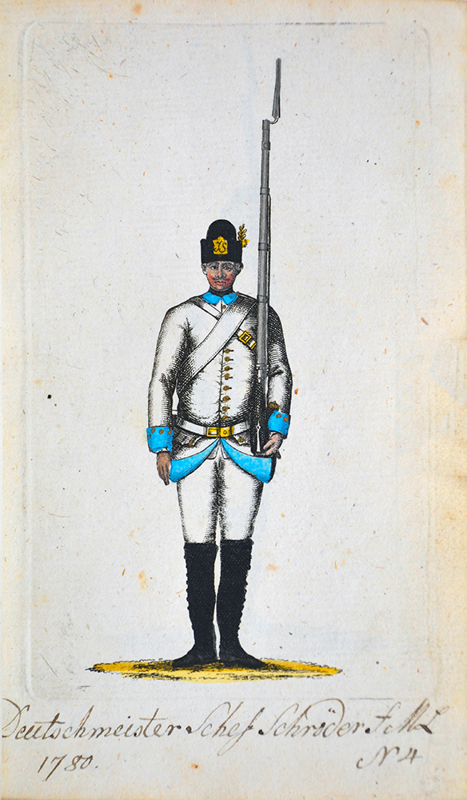
Fusilier (1780)

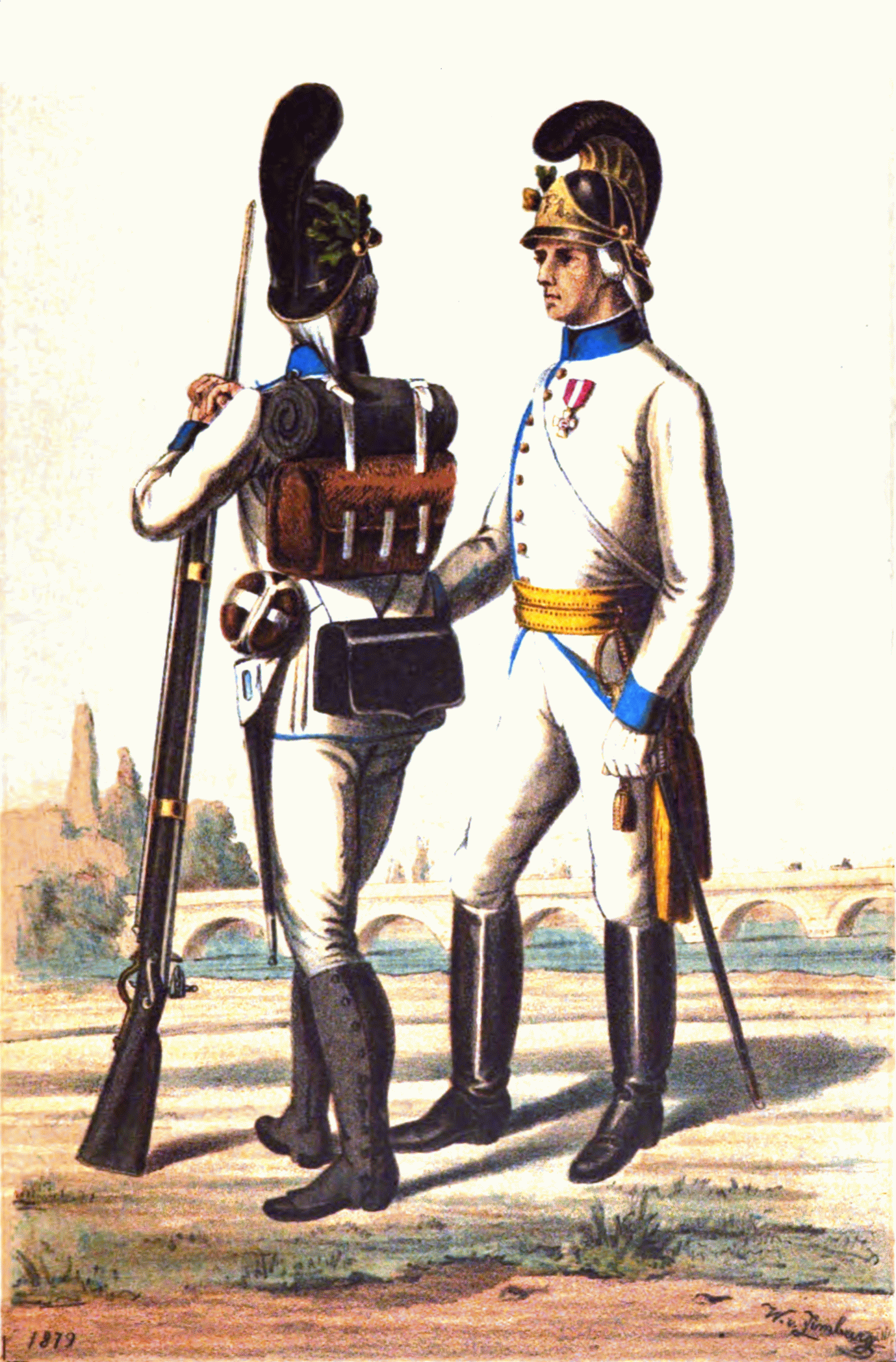
Gemeiner and Officer (1798)

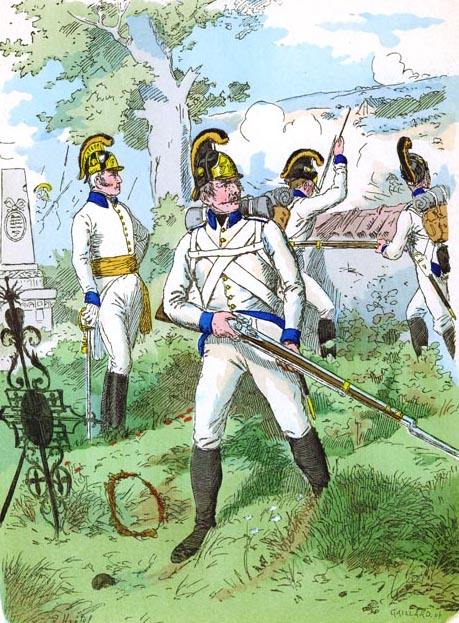
Infantry (1804)

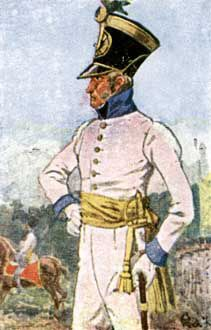
Officer (~1806)

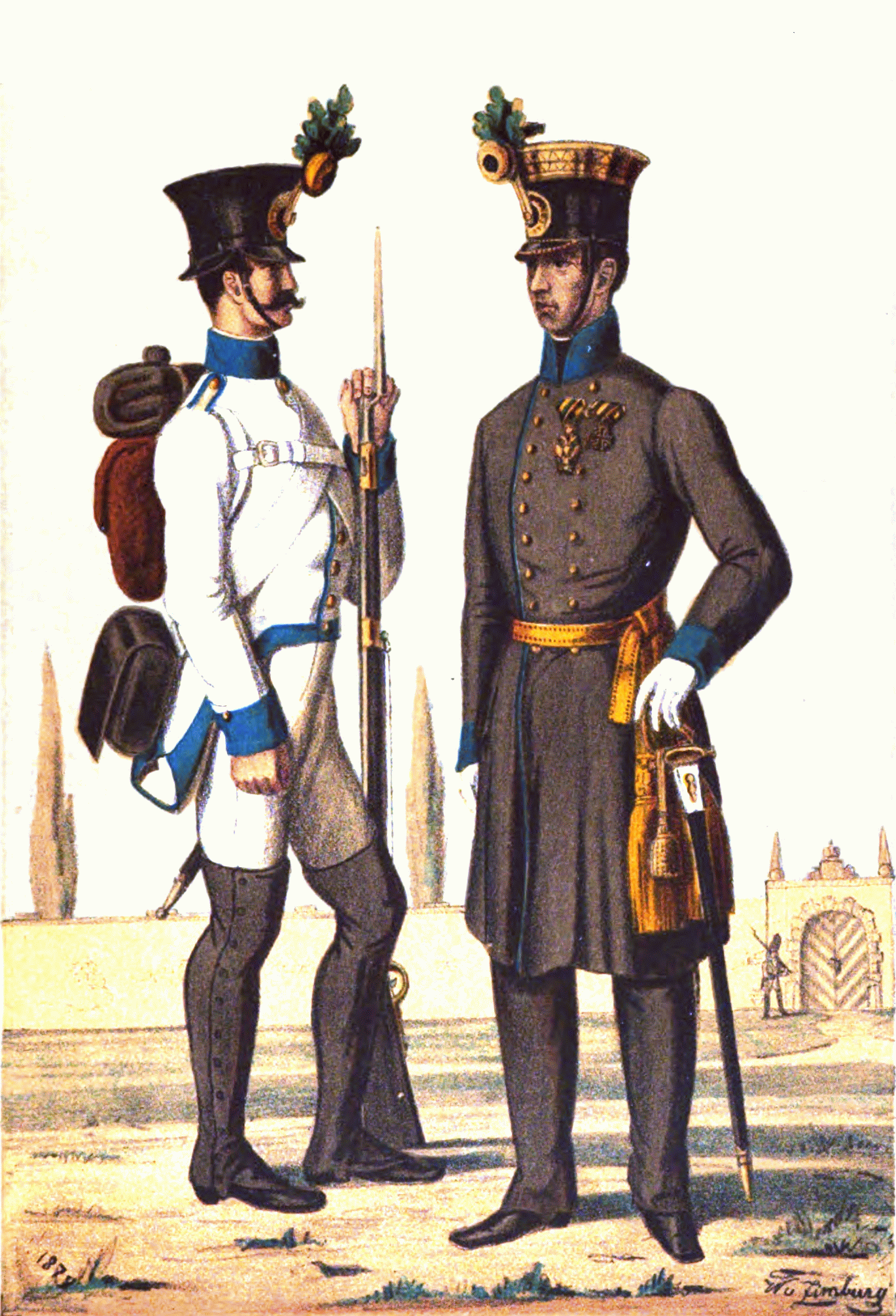
Gemeiner and Officer (1809)

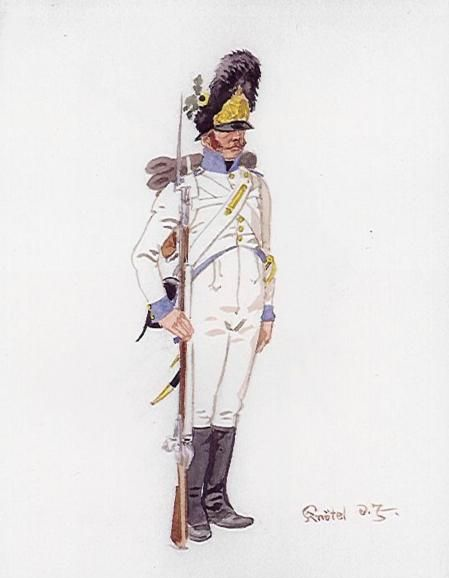
Grenadier (1809)
