= La Ley discography =

- Studio albums: 8
- Extended plays: 2
- Live albums: 1
- Compilation albums: 4
- Singles: 38
- Music videos: 29

La Ley is a two-time Latin Grammy Award winning Chilean pop rock band formed in 1987 by lead singer Beto Cuevas. They released their debut album Desiertos in 1990, which was commercially unsuccessful. In 1991 released their official first studio album, Doble Opuesto featured a cover version of The Rolling Stones' #1 hit single "Angie". In 1993 released La Ley, in 1995 released Invisible; Vértigo in 1998. In 1999 released Uno, which is considered to be their most successful album to date, and their last one Libertad. They also performed on MTV Unplugged, and released a greatest hits compilation, Historias e Histeria. The band reunited in 2014.

== Albums ==
=== Studio albums ===
| Title | Album details | Peak chart positions | Certifications |
| Title | Album details | US Latin | Certifications |
|---|---|---|---|
| Desiertos | Released: July 24, 1990; Label: EMI Music | — | |
| Doble Opuesto | Released: October 11, 1991; Label: Universal Music | — | |
| La Ley | Released: February 6, 1993; Label: Universal Music | — | |
| Invisible | Released: July 28, 1995; Label: Warner Music México | — | |
| Vértigo | Released: February 17, 1998; Label: WEA | — | |
| Uno | Released: February 21, 2000; Label: WEA | 41 | AMPROFON: Platinum; RIAA: Platinum (Latin) |
| Libertad | Released: September 27, 2003; Label: WEA | 12 | CAPIF: Gold |
| Adaptación | Released: April 8, 2016; Label: Warner Music | 17 | |
"—" denotes a recording that did not chart or was not released in that territory.

=== Live albums ===
| Title | Album details | Peak chart positions | Certifications |
| Title | Album details | US Latin | Certifications |
|---|---|---|---|
| MTV Unplugged | Released: September 4, 2001; Label: WEA | 13 | AMPROFON: 2× Platinum; RIAA: Platinum (Latin) |

=== Compilation albums ===
| Title | Album details | Peak chart positions | Certifications |
| Title | Album details | US Latin | Certifications |
|---|---|---|---|
| La Ley de La Ley | Released: June 1994; Label: Universal | — | |
| Grandes éxitos | Released: 2002; Label: Universal | — | CAPIF: Gold |
| Historias e Histeria | Released: November 30, 2004; Label: WEA | 33 | AMPROFON: Platinum |
| Retour | Released: April 29, 2014; Label: Warner Music | 8 | |
"—" denotes a recording that did not chart or was not released in that territory.

== Extended plays ==
| Title | Album details | Peak chart positions | Certifications |
| Title | Album details | US Latin | Certifications |
|---|---|---|---|
| La Ley | Released: 1988; Label: EMI Music | — | |
| Cara de Dios | Released: May 1994; Label: Universal Music | — | |
"—" denotes a recording that did not chart or was not released in that territory.

== Singles ==
| Title | Year | Peak chart positions | | | | | | Album |
| Title | Year | CHI | GUA | HON | MEX | NIC | US Latin | Album |
|---|---|---|---|---|---|---|---|---|
| "La Luna" | 1988 | — | — | — | — | — | — | La Ley (1988) |
| "Sólo Un Juego" | 1988 | — | — | — | — | — | — | La Ley (1988) |
| "Desiertos" | 1989 | — | — | — | — | — | — | Desiertos |
| "Qué Va a Suceder" | 1989 | — | — | — | — | — | — | Desiertos |
| "Sad" | 1990 | — | — | — | — | — | — | Desiertos |
| "Angie" | 1991 | — | — | — | — | — | — | Doble Opuesto |
| "Doble Opuesto" | 1991 | — | — | — | — | — | — | Doble Opuesto |
| "Prisioneros de la Piel" | 1992 | — | — | — | — | — | — | Doble Opuesto |
| "Tejedores de Ilusión" | 1992 | — | — | — | — | — | — | La Ley (1993) |
| "Auto-Ruta (Feel the Skin)" | 1993 | — | — | — | — | — | — | La Ley (1993) |
| "En la Ciudad" | 1994 | — | — | — | — | — | — | Cara de Dios |
| "El Duelo" | 1995 | — | — | — | — | — | — | Invisible |
| "Día Cero" | 1995 | — | — | — | 6 | — | — | Invisible |
| "Hombre" | 1995 | — | — | — | — | — | — | Invisible |
| "Cielo Market" | 1996 | — | — | — | — | — | — | Invisible |
| "1-800 Dual" | 1996 | — | — | — | — | — | — | Invisible |
| "Fotofobia" | 1997 | — | — | — | — | — | — | Vértigo |
| "Vi" | 1998 | — | — | 2 | — | 3 | — | Vértigo |
| "Tanta Ciudad" | 1998 | — | — | — | — | — | — | Vértigo |
| "Sed" | 1998 | — | — | — | — | — | — | Vértigo |
| "Aquí" | 2000 | 3 | 9 | — | — | — | — | Uno |
| "Eternidad" | 2000 | — | — | — | — | — | — | Uno |
| "Fuera de Mí" | 2000 | 2 | 3 | 7 | — | — | — | Uno |
| "Paraíso" | 2000 | — | — | — | — | — | — | Uno |
| "Verano Espacial" | 2001 | — | — | — | — | — | — | Uno |
| "Everytime / Siempre" | 2001 | — | — | — | — | — | — | Crazy/Beautiful |
| "Mentira" | 2001 | — | — | — | — | — | 28 | MTV Unplugged |
| "El Duelo" (feat. Ely Guerra) | 2001 | — | 4 | — | — | — | 30 | MTV Unplugged |
| "Intenta Amar" | 2002 | — | — | — | — | — | — | MTV Unplugged |
| "Ámate y Sálvate" | 2003 | — | — | 3 | — | — | — | Libertad |
| "Más Allá" | 2003 | — | — | — | — | — | — | Libertad |
| "Mi Ley" | 2004 | — | — | — | — | — | — | Libertad |
| "Mírate" | 2004 | — | — | — | — | — | — | Historias e Histeria |
| "Histeria" | 2004 | — | — | — | — | — | — | Historias e Histeria |
| "Bienvenido al Anochecer" | 2005 | — | — | — | — | — | — | Historias e Histeria |
| "Olvidar" | 2014 | — | — | — | 9 | — | 48 | Retour |
| "Sin Ti" | 2014 | — | — | — | — | — | — | Non-album single |
| "Ya No Estás" | 2016 | — | — | — | 31 | — | — | Adaptación |
| "Reino de la Verdad" | 2016 | — | — | — | — | — | — | Adaptación |
"—" denotes a recording that did not chart or was not released in that territory.

== Music videos ==
| Year | Title | Album |
|---|---|---|
| 1989 | "Desiertos" | Desiertos |
| 1991 | "Angie" | Doble Opuesto |
| 1991 | "Doble Opuesto" | Doble Opuesto |
| 1992 | "Prisioneros de la Piel" | Doble Opuesto |
| 1993 | "Tejedores de Ilusión" | La Ley |
| 1993 | "Auto-Ruta (Feel the Skin)" | La Ley |
| 1995 | "El Duelo" | Invisible |
| 1995 | "Día Cero" | Invisible |
| 1995 | "Hombre" | Invisible |
| 1996 | "Cielo Market" | Invisible |
| 1996 | "1-800 Dual" | Invisible |
| 1998 | "Fotofobia" | Vértigo |
| 1998 | "Vi" | Vértigo |
| 1998 | "Tanta Ciudad" | Vértigo |
| 2000 | "Aquí" | Uno |
| 2000 | "Eternidad" | Uno |
| 2000 | "Fuera de Mí" | Uno |
| 2001 | "Everytime / Siempre" (English and Spanish versions) | Crazy/Beautiful |
| 2003 | "Ámate y Sálvate" | Libertad |
| 2003 | "Más Allá" | Libertad |
| 2004 | "Mi Ley" | Libertad |
| 2004 | "Mírate" | Historias e Histeria |
| 2004 | "Histeria" | Historias e Histeria |
| 2005 | "Bienvenido al Anochecer" | Historias e Histeria |
| 2014 | "Olvidar" | Retour |
| 2014 | "Sin Ti" (music and lyric videos) | non-album |
| 2016 | "Ya No Estás" | Adaptación |
