= La Ley =

La Ley, Spanish for The Law, may refer to:

- La Ley (band), a Chilean rock band
  - La Ley (EP), a 1988 EP by the band
  - La Ley (album), a 1993 album by the band
- "La Ley", a 2019 song by CNCO
- La Ley (publisher), an Argentine publishing company
- La Ley 96.9, or WWPL, which was a Spanish-language radio station licensed to Goldsboro, North Carolina, US from 2003 to 2013 and during 2014
- La Ley 101.1, or WYMY, a Spanish-language radio station licensed to Burlington, North Carolina, US
- WLEY-FM, branded La Ley, a Spanish-language radio station in Aurora, Illinois, US
- 730 & 105.7 La Ley or WFMC, a Spanish-language radio station licensed to Goldsboro, North Carolina, US
- 1010 AM & 92.9 FM La Ley, or WWMC, a Spanish-language radio station licensed to Kinston, North Carolina, US

== See also ==
- Ley (disambiguation)
- LEY (disambiguation)
