= Retour (La Ley album) =

Greatest hits album by La Ley
- Released: April 29, 2014
- Recorded: 1995–2014
- Genre: Rock, pop
- Length: 1:14:33
- Label: Warner Music
- Producer: Beto Cuevas

La Ley chronology
Historias e Histeria (2004)	Retour (2014)	Adaptación (2016)

Singles from Retour
- 1. "Olvidar" Released: March 4, 2014

Retour is the third compilation album of the Chilean group La Ley, which was launched in 2014 to mark the return of the group to the stage, having been nine years since their separation in 2005. This compilation album includes only songs from Warner Music.

== Track listing ==
1. "Olvidar"
2. "El Duelo" (from album Invisible)
3. "Día Cero" (from album Invisible)
4. "Cielo Market" (from album Invisible)
5. "Hombre" (from album Invisible)
6. "Ví" (from album Vértigo)
7. "Ciertos Civiles" (from album Vértigo)
8. "Tanta Ciudad" (from album Vértigo)
9. "Aquí" (from album Uno)
10. "Fuera de Mi" (from album Uno)
11. "Delirando" (from album Uno)
12. "Mentira" (from album La Ley MTV Unplugged)
13. "Intenta Amar" (from album La Ley MTV Unplugged)
14. "El Duelo" (from album La Ley MTV Unplugged)
15. "Ámate y Sálvate" (from album Libertad)
16. "Mi Ley" (from album Libertad)
17. "Surazul" (from album Libertad)

== Personnel ==
- Beto Cuevas: vocals, guitars.
- Mauricio Clavería: drums.
- Pedro Frugone: guitars.

== Charts ==
Chart (2014)	Peak position
US Top Latin Albums (Billboard)	8
US Latin Pop Albums (Billboard)	5
