= Von der Leyen (disambiguation) =

Ursula von der Leyen (born 1958) is a German politician, and president of the European Commission since 2019.

Von der Leyen (German pronunciation: [fɔn deːɐ̯ ˈlaɪən]) may also refer to:

- Members of the House of Leyen, a German noble family
  - Damian Hartard von der Leyen-Hohengeroldseck (1624–1678), German nobleman and prince-bishop
  - Friedrich von der Leyen (1873–1966), German philologist
  - Johann von der Leyen (c. 1510 – 10 February 1567)
  - Karl Kaspar von der Leyen (1618–1676)
  - Marianne von der Leyen (1746–1804), German noblewoman
  - Fürst von der Leyen und zu Hohengeroldseck, a noble title held by the family
- Von der Leyen (family from Krefeld), originally a family of silk merchants
  - Heiko von der Leyen (born 1955), German physician

== See also ==
- Leyens (disambiguation)
- Principality of Leyen, a Napoleonic state
- Von der Leyen Commission I
- Von der Leyen Commission II
