= Erwein, 2nd Prince of Leyen =

Prince of Leyen

Erwein I von der Leyen
- Prince of Leyen and of Hohengeroldseck; Count of Hohengeroldseck
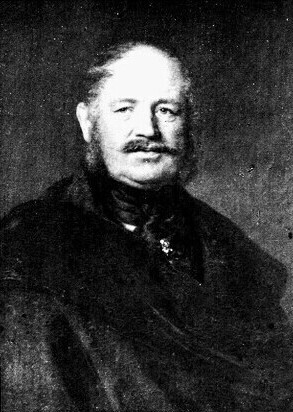
- Born: Karl Eugen Damian Erwein von der Leyen; 3 April 1798; Wiesentheid
- Died: 17 May 1879 (aged 81); Waal, Bavaria
- Spouse: Sophie Therese of Schönborn-Buchheim (m. 1818; died 1876)
- Issue: Philipp Franz Erwein Theodor von der Leyen
- House: Leyen
- Father: Philipp Franz Wilhelm Ignaz Peter von der Leyen
- Mother: Sophia Therese Walpurgis von Schönborn

Karl Eugen Damian Erwein, Fürst von der Leyen und zu Hohengeroldseck (3 April 1798 – 17 May 1879) was a Baden nobleman, Bavarian landowner and Major General.

== Early life ==
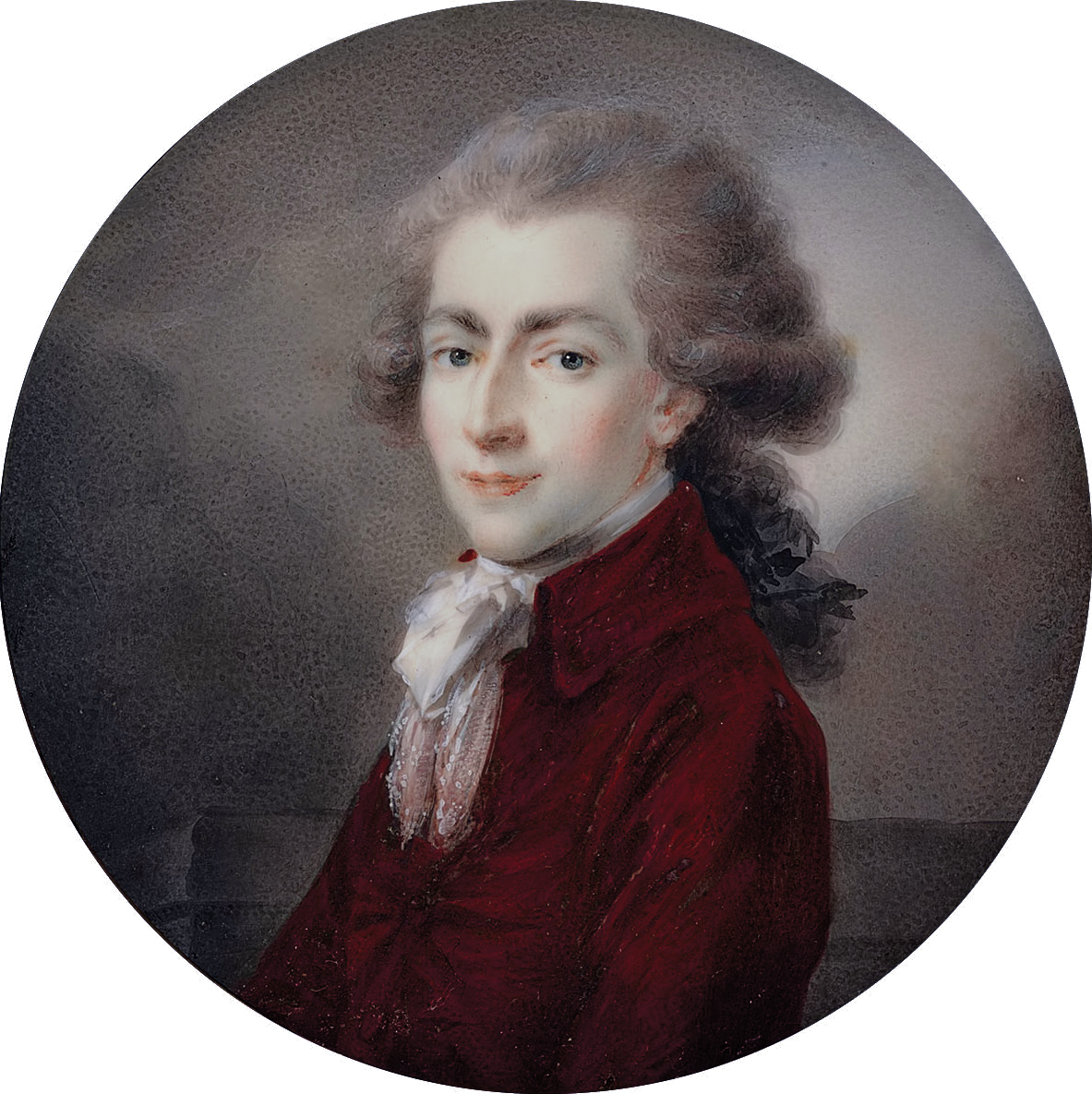
Portrait of his father, Prince Philipp Franz, by Heinrich Füger

He was born on 3 April 1798 at Wiesentheid, the son of Sophia Therese Walpurgis von Schönborn (1772–1810) and Philipp Franz Wilhelm Ignaz Peter von der Leyen (1766–1829), who briefly ruled the Principality of Leyen. His sister Amalia, was the wife of Count Louis Tascher de La Pagerie (a first cousin of the French Empress Josephine).

His paternal grandparents were Franz Georg Karl Anton von der Leyen und zu Hohengeroldseck and the former Baroness Maria Anna Sophia of Dalberg (sister of Karl Theodor Anton Maria von Dalberg, who later became Prince-Primate of the Confederation of the Rhine). Through his sister Amalia, he was an uncle of Charles, Duc de Tascher de La Pagerie. His maternal grandparents were Count Hugo Damian Erwein von Schönborn-Wiesentheid and Countess Maria Anna von Stadion zu Thannhausen und Warthausen.

== Career ==
On the establishment of the Confederation of the Rhine in 1806, the County of Hohengeroldseck was raised to a Principality, and his father, Philipp Franz, who had succeeded his father as Count of Hohengeroldseck in 1775, became the 1st Prince of Leyen and of Hohengeroldseck. After the Confederation was dissolved in 1813, the Principality of Leyen was under Allied administration from May 1814. By the Congress of Vienna, it was given to Austria, but was sold to the Grand Duchy of Baden in 1819. His father kept the title of Fürst (Prince), though now without a Principality.

Upon his father's death in 1829, he inherited the title, Prince of Leyen and of Hohengeroldseck.

== Personal life ==
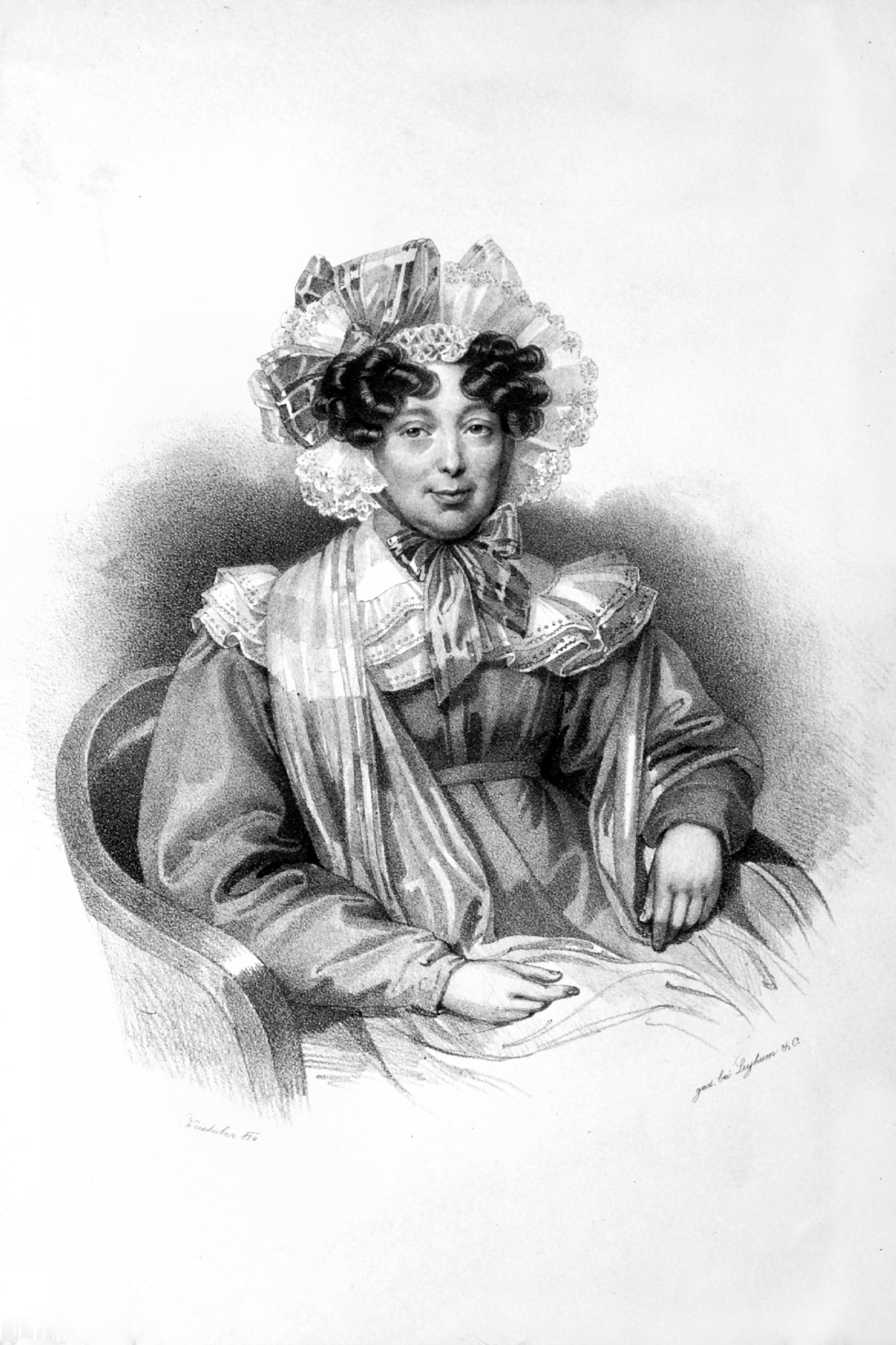
Lithograph of his wife, Sophie Therese (née Schönborn-Buchheim), by Josef Kriehuber, 1843

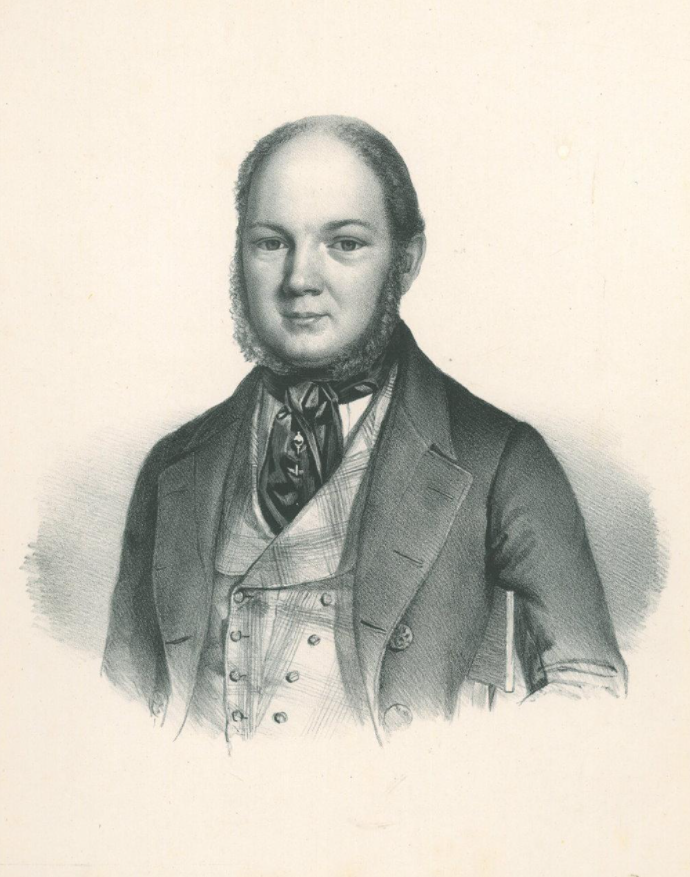
Lithograph of his eldest son, Philipp

In 1818, Erwein married his double first cousin Sophie Therese of Schönborn-Buchheim (1798–1876), a daughter of Count Franz Philipp von Schönborn-Buchheim and Countess Maria Sophie von der Leyen. Together, they were the parents of:

- Philipp Franz Erwein Theodor von der Leyen (1819–1882), who married Princess Adelheid Karoline von Thurn und Taxis, the daughter of Prince Karl Theodor von Thurn und Taxis (a direct descendant of Alexander Ferdinand, 3rd Prince of Thurn and Taxis) and Juliane Karoline von Einsiedel.
- Franz Ludwig Erwein Damian von der Leyen (1821–1875), a Bavarian Major à la suite.
- Amalie Sophie Marie Erwine Caroline Luise von der Leyen (1824–1857)

The Prince of Leyen died in Waal, Bavaria on 17 May 1879, and was succeeded in his titles by his eldest son, Philipp.

=== Descendants ===
Through his son Philipp, he was a grandfather of Princess Maria Anna von der Leyen (1857–1936), who married Baron Anton von Aretin; Princess Julie Luise von der Leyen (1860–1930), wife of Count Hans von Franckenstein (son of Georg Arbogast von Franckenstein); Erwein von der Leyen (1863–1938), who married Princess Maria Charlotte of Salm-Reifferscheidt; and Princess Eugenie von der Leyen (1867–1929), a Roman Catholic mystic.
