= Historias e Histeria =

Greatest hits album by La Ley
- Released: November 30, 2004
- Recorded: 1990–2004
- Genre: Rock, pop
- Label: WEA
- Producer: Humberto Gatica

La Ley chronology
Libertad (2003)	Historias e Histeria (2004)	Retour (2014)

Singles from Historias e Histeria
- 1. "Mírate" Released: 2004; 2. "Histeria" Released: 2004; 3. "Bienvenido al Anochecer" Released: 2005

Professional ratings
Review scores
Source	Rating
Allmusic	4.5/5 stars

Historias e Histeria is La Ley's second greatest hits compilation album. The band was convinced to do this in lieu of a new studio album. The band had to make an album of 16 songs (with three new ones) in very limited amount of time. The album was released almost immediately after their previous album Libertad after only one year of the latter's release. The album contains some of the most popular songs of each of their albums plus three new songs, "Mirate", "Histeria", and "Bienvenido al Anochecer." The first single of the album Mírate was released while the band was still promoting the final single "Mi Ley" from the album, Libertad.

== Track listing, CD side ==
1. "Mírate" - 4:02
2. "Día Cero" (from album Invisible)
3. "Doble Opuesto" (from album Doble Opuesto)
4. "Mentira" (from album La Ley MTV Unplugged)
5. "Bienvenido al Anochecer" - 5:20
6. "Aquí" (from album Uno)
7. "Prisioneros de la Piel" (from album Doble Opuesto)
8. "Ámate y Sálvate" (from album Libertad)
9. "Histeria" - 4:08
10. "Fuera de Mi" (from album Uno)
11. "Cielo Market" (from album Invisible)
12. "Intenta Amar" (from album La Ley MTV Unplugged)
13. "Ví" (from album Vértigo)
14. "El Duelo" (from album Invisible)
15. "Más Allá" (from album Libertad)
16. "Tejedores de Ilusión" (from album La Ley)
17. "Canales Unidos" (bonus track)
18. "Mírate" (Remix) (bonus track)

== Track listing, DVD side ==
1. "Desiertos" (from album Desiertos)
2. "Angie" (from album Doble Opuesto)
3. "Doble Opuesto" (from album Doble Opuesto)
4. "Prisioneros De La Piel" (from album Doble Opuesto)
5. "Auto Ruta (feel The Skin)" (from album La Ley)
6. "Tejedores De Ilusión" (from album La Ley)
7. "El Duelo" (from album Invisible)
8. "Día Cero" (Invisible)
9. "Hombre" (from album Invisible)
10. "Cielo Market" (from album Invisible)
11. "1-800 Dual" (from album Invisible)
12. "Fotofobia" (from album Vértigo)
13. "Vi" (from album Vértigo)
14. "Tanta Ciudad" (from album Vértigo)
15. "Aquí" (from album Uno)
16. "Fuera De Mí" (from album Uno)
17. "Eternidad" (from album Uno)
18. "Mentira" (from album La Ley MTV Unplugged)
19. "El Duelo" (from album La Ley MTV Unplugged)
20. "Intenta Amar" (from album La Ley MTV Unplugged)
21. "Ámate Y Sálvate" (from album Libertad)
22. "Más Allá" (from album Libertad)
23. "Mi Ley" (from album Libertad)

== Personnel ==
=== CD ===
- Mauricio Clavería - Drums
- Beto Cuevas - Vocalist
- Pedro Frugone - Lead Guitar (all tracks minus 3 and 16)
- Andrés Bobe - lead guitar (tracks 3 and 16)
- Archie Frugone - bass (tracks 1, 4, 5, 6, 7, 8, 9, 10, 12, and 15)
- Luciano Rojas - bass (tracks 2, 3, 7, 11, 13, and 14)
- Rodrigo Aboitiz - keyboard (tracks 2, 11, and 14)
- Humberto Gatica - effects (tracks 6 and 10, uncredited)
- Andrés Sylleros - keyboard (tracks 8 and 15)

== Charts ==
Chart (2004)	Peak position
US Top Latin Albums (Billboard)	33
US Latin Pop Albums (Billboard)	9

== Sales and certifications ==
Region	Certification	Certified units/sales
Mexico (AMPROFON)	Gold	50,000^{^}
^{^} Shipments figures based on certification alone.
