= Ley =

Ley may refer to:

== Toponyms ==
- Ley (landform), name for a crag, rock or cliff in the north German language area
- Ley (crater), crater on the Moon
- Ley, Moselle, commune in France
- Ley Hill, hill in England

== People ==
- Ley Matampi (born 1989), Congolese professional footballer
- Ley Sander, professor of neurology and clinical epilepsy at University College London
- Ley baronets, baronetcies in England and the United Kingdom
  - Francis Ley (1846–1916), 1st Baronet
- Bob Ley (born 1955), American sportscaster
- David Ley, Canadian Geographer
- Douglas Ley, American educator and politician
- Duncan Ley, Australian playwright
- Felix Ley (1909–1972), Roman Catholic bishop
- Gary Ley (born 1956), Welsh writer
- George Ley (born 1946), English footballer
- Henry Ley (organist) (1887–1962), English musician
- Herbert Ley, Jr., American doctor
- Hugh Ley (1790–1837), English physician
- James Ley, 1st Earl of Marlborough (1552–1629), English jurist
- John Ley (clergyman) (1583–1662), English Puritan clergyman
- John Henry Ley (1770–1850), Clerk of the House of Commons
- Juan Manuel Ley (1933–2016), Mexican businessman
- Rick Ley (born 1948), Canadian hockey player
- Robert Ley (1890–1945), German Nazi politician
- Shaun Ley (born 1961), British journalist and BBC presenter
- Sophie Ley (1849–1918), German painter
- Steven V. Ley, British chemistry professor
- Sussan Ley (born 1961), Australian politician
- Tengku Djan Ley (born 1976), Malaysian race car driver
- Terry Ley (born 1947), American baseball player
- Thomas John Ley, Australian politician
- Willy Ley (1906–1969), science writer
- Alternate romanization of Li (surname 李) among Asian Latin Americans

== Other uses ==
- Ley lines, a pseudoscientific belief that apparent alignments of landmarks etc. are not accidental and have spiritual significance.
- Ley-class minehunter, a class of inshore minehunter built for the Royal Navy in the mid-1950s
- Ley farming, an agricultural system
- Lemolang language (ISO:639:I code), an Austronesian language of Sulawesi, Indonesia
- A type of pewter alloy
- La Ley (band), a Chilean rock band
  - La Ley (album), the band's 1993 self-titled album
- La Ley (publisher), Argentinian law publisher
- Casa Ley, Mexican grocery store chain
- Ley (Colombia), defunct Colombian supermarket chain

== See also ==
- Leys (disambiguation)
- LEY (disambiguation)
- Lay (disambiguation)
- Lei (disambiguation)
- Leye (disambiguation)
- Leyes (disambiguation)
- Leyens (disambiguation)
- Cowley (surname)
