= Cara de Dios =

EP by La Ley
- Released: May 2, 1994
- Recorded: December 1993; Estudios Sonus (Santiago, Chile)
- Genre: Rock / Pop
- Label: PolyGram
- Producer: Humberto Gatica

La Ley chronology
La Ley (1993)	Cara de Dios (1994)	La Ley de La Ley (1994)

Singles from Cara de Dios
- 1. "En la Ciudad" Released: May 2, 1994

Cara de Dios is an EP by the Chilean band La Ley. La Ley performed a new song, "En La Ciudad", at a live TV concert, which set the expectations for the release of a new album. Because fans were expecting an album featuring the song, PolyGram decided to release "Cara de Dios", which remains an album searched for by the fans, similar to the albums Desiertos, Doble Opuesto, and La Ley. Two singles were released from the album, for which no music videos were produced and this is the final album with band founder and guitarist Andrés Bobe.

== Track listing ==
1. "En la Ciudad" (Cara de Díos) - (Bobe, Cuevas, Clavería, Rojas) – 4:22
2. "Desiertos" (Mix) - (Bobe, Delgado, Aboitiz) – 6:42
3. "A Veces" - (Bobe, Arbulu) – 5:18
4. "Rhythm Valentine" - (Bobe, Cuevas) – 3:54

== Personnel ==
=== La Ley ===
- Andrés Bobe – guitar
- Mauricio Clavería – drums
- Alberto "Beto" Cuevas – vocals
- Luciano Rojas – bass

=== Others ===
- Ramon Villanueva – producer
- Hernan Rojas – recording engineer
- Oscar Lopez - recording engineer & mixing engineer
- Walter Gonzalez – recording engineer
- Humberto Gatica – mix
