= Leyens =

Leyen, Leyens, or variation, may refer to:

== Places ==
- Leyen, Moselle, Lorraine, Grand-Est, France; an alternate name of Ley, France, formerly Leyen, Germany
- Principality of Leyen, a defunct Germanic principality in Baden-Württemberg, once ruled by the House of Leyen
- De Leyens, Buytenwegh de Leyens, Zoetermeer, South Holland, Netherlands

== People ==
- House of Leyen, a Germanic princely noble house, whose name derives from the principality it ruled
- von der Leyen, a German noble family
- Leyén Zulueta (born 1979) Cuban judoka

== Other uses ==
- Ter Leyen Castle, Boekhoute, Belgium
- De Leyens RandstadRail station, Zoetermeer, Netherlands; a train station on RandstadRail

== See also ==
- von der Leyen (disambiguation)
- Leye (disambiguation)
- Ley (disambiguation)
