= Philip Francis, Prince of Leyen =

Ruler of the Principality of Leyen

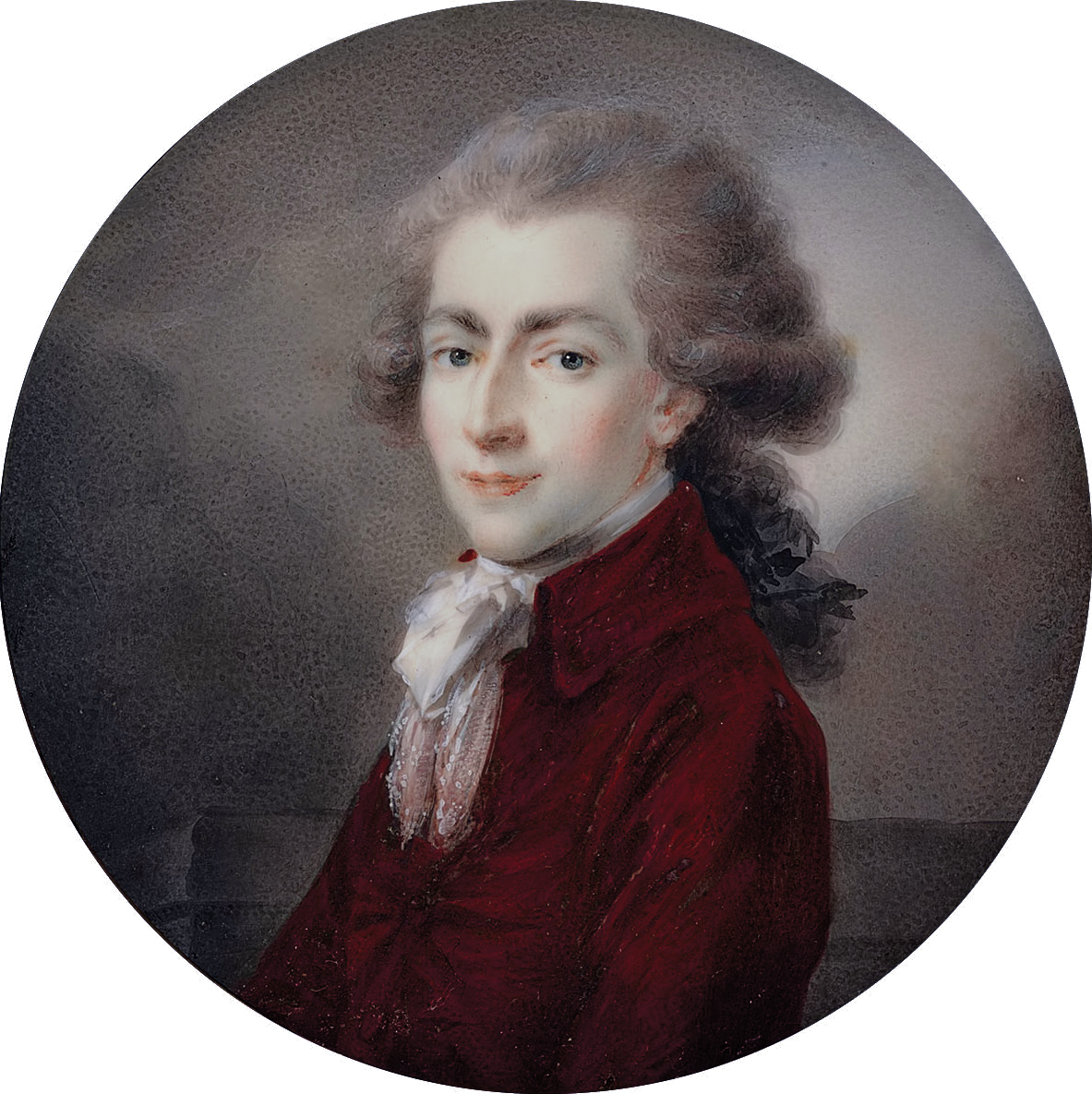
Prince Philipp von der Leyen und zu Hohengeroldseck, painted by Heinrich Friedrich Füger (18th century)

Philipp Franz Wilhelm Ignaz Peter, Fürst von der Leyen und zu Hohengeroldseck (1 August 1766 – 23 November 1829) was a German nobleman who briefly ruled the Principality of Leyen.

== Early life ==
He was born at Koblenz, the son of Franz Georg Karl Anton von der Leyen und zu Hohengeroldseck and his wife, Baroness Maria Anna Sophia of Dalberg. His mother's brother was Karl Theodor Anton Maria von Dalberg, who later became Prince-Primate of the Confederation of the Rhine. On 26 September 1775 Philipp Franz succeeded his father as Count of Hohengeroldseck.

== Career ==
On the establishment of the Confederation of the Rhine on 12 July 1806, the County of Hohengeroldseck was raised to a Principality, and Philipp Franz became Fürst von der Leyen und zu Hohengeroldseck.

The Confederation was dissolved in 1813 and from 30 May 1814 the Principality of Leyen was under Allied administration. By the Congress of Vienna, it was mediatized to Austria, but was sold to the Grand Duchy of Baden in 1819. Philipp Franz kept the title of Fürst (Prince), though now without a Principality.

== Personal life ==
On 15 May 1788 at Pommersfelden, Philipp Franz was married to Countess Sophia Therese Walpurgis von Schönborn-Wiesentheid (Mainz, 15 August 1772 – Paris, 4 July 1810), the daughter of Count Hugo Damian Erwein von Schönborn-Wiesentheid. Together, they had two children:

- Maria Amalia Theodora Maria Antonia Charlotte Friederike Sophie Walpurgis (Blieskastel, 2 September 1789 – Sulz, 21 July 1870), married at Paris 10 August 1810 to Count Louis Tascher de La Pagerie, a first cousin of the French Empress Josephine.
- Karl Eugen Damian Erwein (Wiesentheid, 3 April 1798 – Waal, 17 May 1879), who succeeded his father as Fürst von der Leyen und zu Hohengeroldseck. He married his double first cousin Sophie Therese of Schönborn-Buchheim, daughter of Count Franz Philipp von Schönborn-Buchheim.

The Prince of Leyen died on 23 November 1829 at the age of 63 in Köln.

=== Descendants ===
Through his daughter, Princess Amalia, he was a grandfather of Charles Tascher de La Pagerie (1811-1869), who later became the 1st Duc de Tascher de La Pagerie (1859).
