= Leyes =

Leyes may refer to:

== People ==
- Ángel Leyes (1930–1996), Argentine boxer
- Carlos Leyes (born 1950), Argentinian boxer
- Damián Leyes (born 1986), Argentine soccer footballer
- Gabriel Leyes (born 1990), Uruguayan soccer player
- Gregorio Pacheco Leyes (1823–1899), Bolivian businessman
- Miguel Ángel Leyes (born 1952), Chilean soccer player
- Narciso Campero Leyes (1813–1896), Bolivian general
- Nery Leyes (born 1989), Argentinian soccer player

== Other uses ==
- Leyes Priory, Derbyshire, England, UK
- Leyes Wood, Groombridge, East Sussex, England, UK; a listed house

== See also ==
- Siete Leyes (7 laws) of California-Texas-Mexico
- Leye (disambiguation)
- Ley (disambiguation)
- Leys (disambiguation)
