= Fan Lei =

Fan Lei may refer to:

- Fan Lei (clarinetist) (范磊; Fàn Lěi, born 1965), Chinese-American clarinetist
- Fan Lei (table tennis) (范蕾; Fàn Lěi, born 1983), Chinese para table tennis player

== See also ==
- Fan (disambiguation)
- Lei (disambiguation)
- Lei Fang (レイファン), Koei Tecmo Dead or Alive video game character
- Fang Lei (房蕾), Chinese singer
- Lei Feng (雷锋), Chinese PLA soldier
