= Fürst von der Leyen und zu Hohengeroldseck =

Princely coat of arms of the Leyen family

Fürst von der Leyen und zu Hohengeroldseck was a German noble title of the House of Leyen.

== History ==
In 1657, Hugo Ernst von der Leyen-Adendorf, Lord of Blieskastel, was created Reichsfreiherr (Imperial Baron) von der Leyen. In 1693, his son, Karl Kaspar received the Habsburg dominion of Hohengeroldseck as a fiefdom from Austria, and was created Reichsfreiherr von der Leyen und zu Hohengeroldseck in 1697. In 1711, he was further ennobled he was created Reichsgraf (Imperial Count) von der Leyen und zu Hohengeroldseck. With most of the count's territories lost to Napoleon France, Reichsgraf Philipp Franz still retained the county Geroldseck. Upon joining the Rheinbund in 1806, he was created Fürst (Prince) von der Leyen. In 1819 the principality's holdings were mediatized under the sovereign state Grand Duchy of Baden (until 1871) and, later, as part of the German Empire (from 1871 until 1918), although the title is still being nominally held by von der Leyens.

== Head of the House of Leyen ==
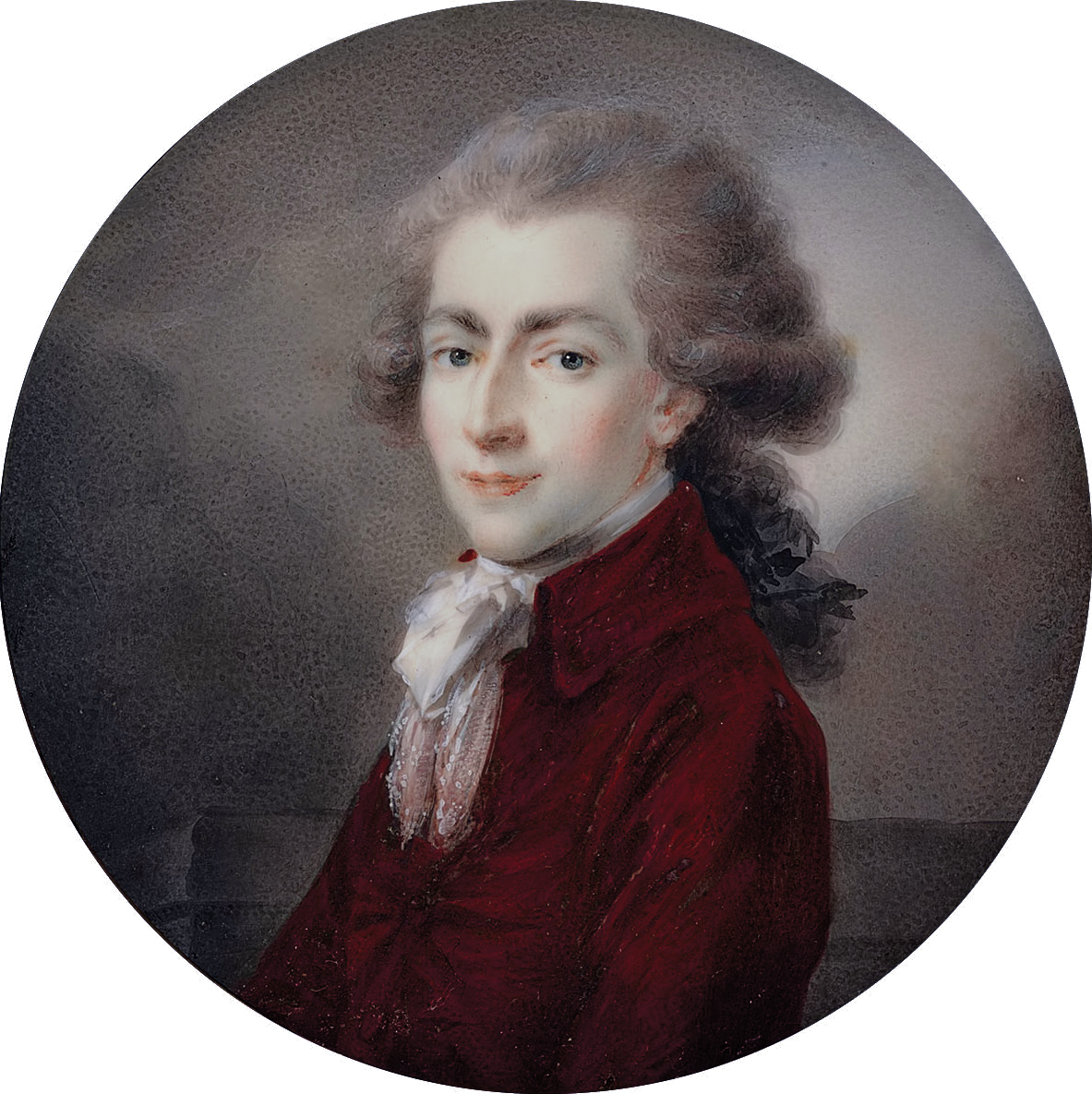
Portrait of Philip Francis, Prince of Leyen, by Heinrich Füger

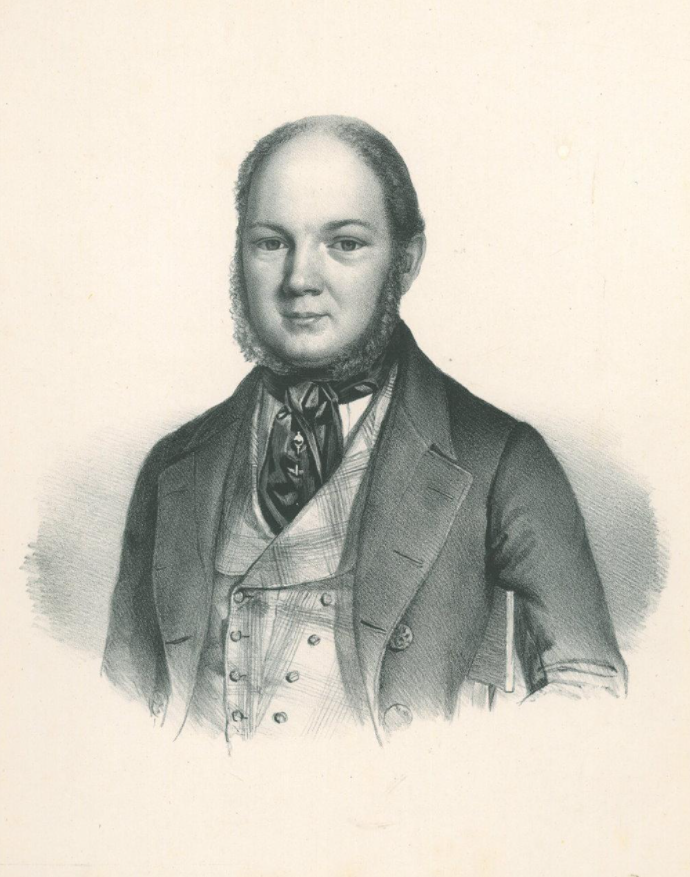
Lithograph of Philipp, 3rd Prince of Leyen

=== Reichsfreiherr (Imperial Baron) von der Leyen ===
- 1657 – 1665: Hugo Ernst
- 1665 – 1687: Damian Adolf
- 1687 – 1697: Karl Kaspar Franz (1655–1739)

=== Reichsfreiherr (Imperial Baron) von der Leyen und zu Hohengeroldseck ===
- 1697 – 22 November 1711: Karl Kaspar Franz (above)

=== Reichsgraf (Imperial Count) von der Leyen und zu Hohengeroldseck ===
- 22 November 1711 – 20 November 1739: Karl Kaspar Franz (above)
- 20 November 1739 – 16 February 1760: Friedrich Ferdinand Franz (1709–1760)
- 16 February 1760 – 26 September 1775: Franz Georg Karl Anton (1736–1775)
- 26 September 1775 – 12 July 1806: Philipp Franz Wilhelm Ignaz Peter (1766–1829)

=== Fürst (Prince) von der Leyen und zu Hohengeroldseck ===
- 12 July 1806 – 23 November 1829: Philipp Franz Wilhelm Ignaz Peter (above)
- 23 November 1829 – 17 May 1879: Karl Eugen Damian Erwein (1798–1879)
- 17 May 1879 – 24 July 1882: Philipp Franz Erwein Theodor (1819–1882)
- 24 July 1882 – 18 September 1938: Erwein Theodor Philipp Damian (1863–1938)
- 18 September 1938 – 13 February 1970: Erwein Otto Philipp Leopold Franz Joseph Ignatius (1894–1970)
- 13 February 1970 – 9 September 1971: Ferdinand Maria Erwein Harthard Antonius Michael Joseph (1898–1971)
- 9 September 1971: Philipp Erwein Konrad Alfred Eugen Bonifatius Melchior Georg Arbogast von Freyberg-Eisenberg (b. 1967) (Note: Philipp Erwein von Freyberg-Eisenberg, the son of Baron Georg von Freyberg zu Eisenberg and Marie Adelheid Princess of Leyen and of Hohengeroldseck, continued the use of Leyen family name following his adoption by his grandfather, Erwein Otto Philipp, in 1969. The Prince of Leyen is the owner of Waal Castle and Hohengeroldseck Castle.)
  - Wolfram, Hereditary Prince of Leyen and of Hohengeroldseck (b. 1990)

== See also ==
- House of Leyen
- Principality of Leyen
- Hohengeroldseck
