= Marianne von der Leyen =

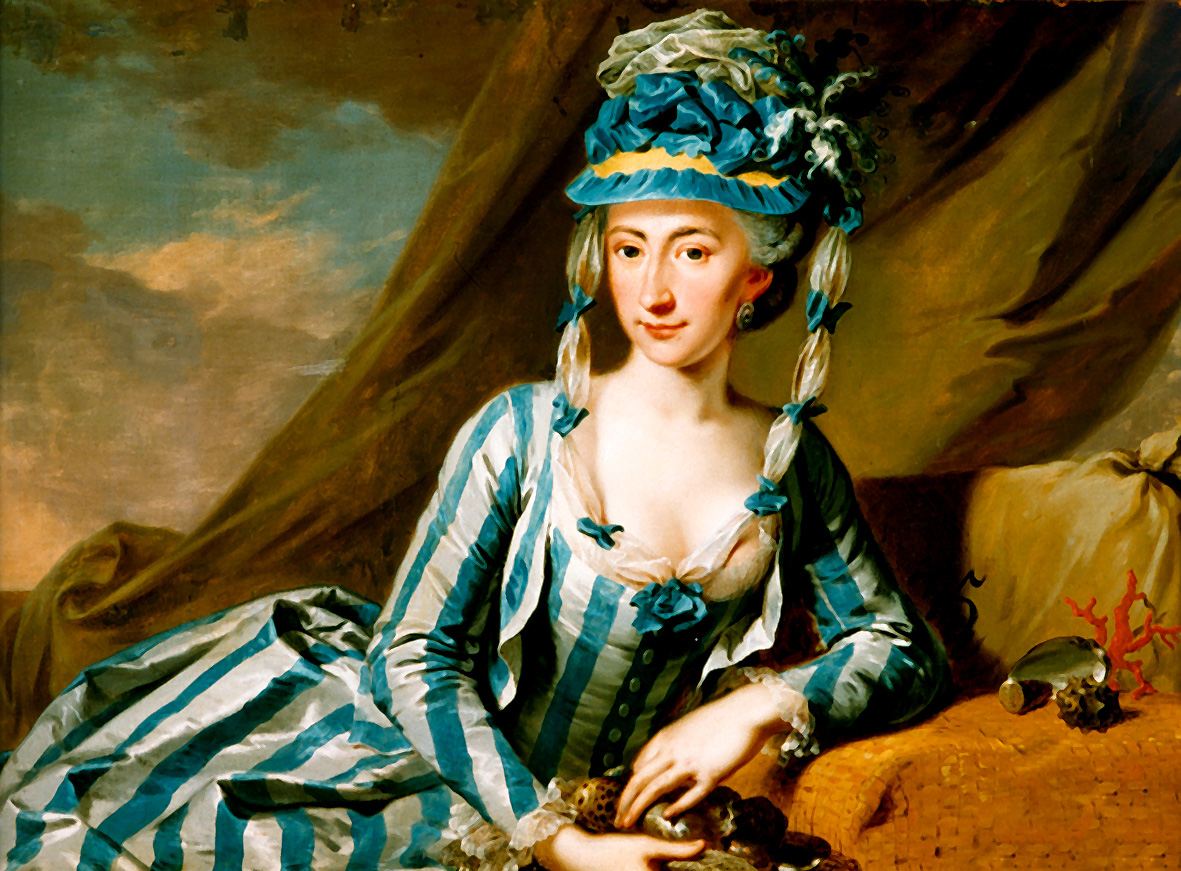
Countess Marianne von der Leyen und zu Hohengeroldseck

Marianne von der Leyen und zu Hohengeroldseck (1746–1804), was a German noblewoman from an ancient House of Leyen, who served as regent of the County of Hohengeroldseck between 1775 and 1793.

== Early life ==
Maria Anna Helene Josepha Marianne was born as the second child and only daughter of Baron Franz Heinrich Kämmerer von Worms genannt von Dalberg (1716–1776) and Countess Maria Sophia Anna von und zu Eltz-Kempenich (1722–1763). Her older brother was Karl Theodor Anton Maria von Dalberg, while her younger brother was Wolfgang Heribert von Dalberg.

== Marriage and regency ==
Marianne married Count Franz Georg Karl Anton von der Leyen und zu Hohengeroldseck (1736–1775). After the death of her husband, she was regent of the County of Hohengeroldseck during the minority of her son Philip Francis, Prince of Leyen from 1775 to 1793.

As the age of legal majority was twenty-five, she legally ruled until 1791, but as her son showed no interest to take over the affairs of state, she was able to continue her regency until the invasion and occupation of Revolutionary France in 1793.

== Escape and death ==
After the French invasion, she managed to escape from the county dressed as a maid servant. She left a French-language description of her escape from the French, which became famous. She died in 1804.
