= 允恭 =

允恭, meaning fair, respectful, may refer to:

- Emperor Ingyō (允恭天皇), 19th Emperor of Japan
- Lei Yungong (雷允恭; died 1022), Song dynasty palace eunuch
- Wanyan Yungong (完顏允恭; 1146－1185), imperial prince of China's Jurchen-led Jin dynasty

== See also ==
- Lei (disambiguation)
- Wanyan
