= Beto Cuevas =

Chilean-Canadian singer

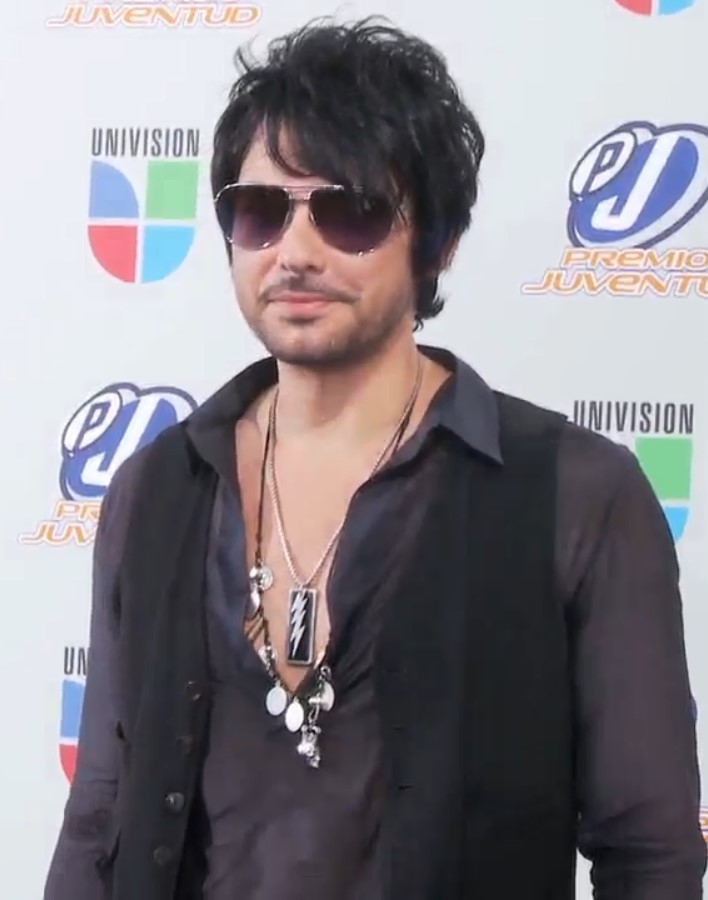
- Beto Cuevas in 2009.
- Born: Luis Alberto Cuevas Olmedo; September 12, 1967 (age 59); Santiago, Chile
- Occupations: spokesperson, model, tv presenter, singer, record producer
- Years active: 1988–2005, 2013–2016 (with La Ley); 2007–2013, 2016–present (solo singer)
- Height: 1.84 m (6 ft 0 in)
- Musical career
- Origin: Montreal, Quebec, Canada
- Genres: Pop rock; alternative rock
- Label: Warner Bros. Records
- Formerly of: La Ley, Lucybell

Luis Alberto Cuevas Olmedo (born September 12, 1967), better known as Beto Cuevas (pronounced [ˈbeto ˈkweβas]), is a Chilean-Canadian singer, songwriter, plastic artist, and painter. He is the lead singer for the Chilean band La Ley. In 2008 he launched his solo career with the release of his album, Miedo Escénico. In 2012 he released his second album, Transformación.

== Music career ==
=== 1988–2004: La Ley ===
In 1988, during a trip to Concón, Chile, Cuevas met Mauricio Clavería, drummer for La Ley. Clavería invited Cuevas to join the band, which had just lost two founding members, Iván Delgado and Shía Arbulú. Beto made his debut as La Ley's singer on their first album, Desiertos, quickly becoming the voice of the band.

During the early years of the band, Cuevas wrote the lyrics, and the music writing was done by the band's founder and leader Andrés Bobe. During this time, La Ley became one of the most successful groups in the country. In 1994 Bobe died in a motorcycle accident after a benefit show, and Cuevas became the leader of the group. He went from being the visible face of the group to becoming the main creative force behind it with the help of his bandmates.

La Ley's story is divided in two: before and after Andrés Bobe. Under Cuevas' influence after the passing of Andres, the band evolved musically and gained success across Latin America. During the shoots for the music videos of the Invisible (1995) album, Cuevas began to co-direct the pieces.

On February 21, 2001, a day before the Viña del Mar Festival, the band was on the Channel 13 show, La Movida del Festival. During a live interview, a member of the audience announced that the group just won a Grammy as best alternative rock group. This moment, and the show at the Quinta Vergara on the next day, marked a turning point. In mid-2001, the group appeared on MTV Unplugged. The recording of this soundtrack was a huge success across Latin America, and cemented the reputation of La Ley as one of the most important Chilean bands of all time.

=== 2005–2009: Solo work ===
In 2005, Beto Cuevas, Pedro Frugone and Mauricio Clavería took a break from La Ley.

Cuevas worked on small projects, including the song "Loud", in collaboration with Masters at Work ("Little Louie" Vega & Kenny "Dope" Gonzalez"). He revisited the song "Mentira", originally released on La Ley MTV Unplugged, and was a part of the soundtrack for the film, La mujer de mi hermano. Other projects included a collaboration with Chilean band Los Prisioneros, on their album Manzana. Here, Cuevas played synthesizers, guitars, and vocals in the song "Insatisfacción", a rendition of the Rolling Stones classic "(I Can't Get No) Satisfaction", and in "Eres Mi Hogar".

In 2007, he shot an episode of the Canal Fox Latinoamérica series Tiempo Final, titled "The Autograph", where he plays a character called Beto. In September 2008, Beto interviewed Morrissey for a Los Angeles channel, LATV.

In March 2008 Cuevas pre-launched his solo debut, over two years since he had last performed with La Ley. Prior to the release of his first solo album he did an intimate tour through the US. His debut solo album, Miedo Escénico was released on September 23, 2008, and spun 3 hit singles: "Vuelvo", "Háblame", and "Un Minuto de Silencio". A year later, in September 2009 he recorded a version of the George Michael classic "Faith", on the Buenos Aires soundstage of La 100 (99.9 fm). The song is featured on the album, La 100 en Vivo.

=== 2010– Present ===
On February 26, 2010, Cuevas shared the stage with Raphael at the Viña del Mar Festival. He was due to perform solo the next day, but next day a great earthquake hit southern Chile, and the Festival was cancelled. In May 2010, Beto released a version of the Violeta Parra classic, "Gracias a la Vida", produced by Humberto Gatica, and featuring stars including Miguel Bosé, Michael Bublé, Fher Olvera, Juan Luis Guerra, Shakira, Laura Pausini and Alejandro Sanz. 100% of the profits of the single went to helping the recovery and supporting Chileans affected by the earthquake.

Cuevas released his second solo album Transformación on September 25, 2012. It featured 12 songs, and a collaboration with Leire Martínez in "Goodbye". The album was recorded entirely in the US and charted in Billboard right away. Beto was chosen as one of the coaches in the second season of talent show La Voz... México, along with Paulina Rubio, Jenni Rivera and Miguel Bosé.

In 2014, La Ley reunited after nine years of separation, and embarked on a new tour. The band announced in 2016 that they were splitting up, again.

Cuevas played the role of Jesus Christ in the 2019 all-star Mexican production of Jesus Christ Superstar.

In 2022 and 2023, Cuevas appeared as one of the coaches on The Voice Chile.

== Personal life ==
Cuevas was born in Santiago, Chile, raised in Caracas, Venezuela and grew up in Montreal, Quebec. He is fluent in French, English and Spanish. His family moved to Montreal, Quebec, Canada to escape Augusto Pinochet's dictatorship, so he also holds a Canadian passport. In 2002, he married model Estela Mora; they separated in 2007, but she remains his manager. He has two children: Martina (born 1988) (from Estela's first marriage in Argentina) and Diego (born 1992). He was in a romantic relationship with actress Bárbara Mori from 2010-2011.

== Discography ==
=== Albums with La Ley ===
- 1990: Desiertos
- 1991: Doble Opuesto
- 1993: La Ley
- 1994: Cara de Dios
- 1995: Invisible
- 1998: Vértigo
- 2000: Uno
- 2001: La Ley MTV Unplugged
- 2003: Libertad
- 2004: Historias e Histeria
- 2014: Retour
- 2016: Adaptación

== Film career ==
Cuevas portrayed the character Padre Santiago in the 2005 Mexican film La mujer de mi hermano (English: My brother's wife). He played a bigger role as the character Santillan in the 2007 American film Borderland.
