= Desiertos =

1990 studio album by La Ley

Studio album by La Ley
- Released: July 24, 1990
- Recorded: April 1989 – March 1990
- Studio: Estudios Horizonte (Santiago, Chile)
- Genre: Rock/New wave/Darkwave
- Label: EMI Music
- Producer: Carlos Fonseca

La Ley chronology
La Ley (1988)	Desiertos (1990)	Doble Opuesto (1991)

Singles from Desiertos
- 1. "Desiertos" Released: 1989; 2. "Qué Va a Suceder" Released: 1989; 3. "Sad" Released: 1990

Desiertos (Spanish: "deserts") is the debut album by Chilean pop/rock band, La Ley. The album was the only one featuring all the original members: Beto Cuevas, Mauricio Clavería, Andrés Bobe, Luciano Rojas, and Rodrigo Aboitiz. Due to inner problems with the producer, only 500 copies of the album were released. Following the band's success, the album has become a highly sought-after item by fans.

Only one single was released from the album, the song "Desiertos" (although the song "Espina Feroz" was considered for release as the first single).

The album underwent a remastering process between 2024 and 2025 and released on 30 of April 2026.

== Backstory ==
In early 1988, La Ley's main singer, Shia Arbulú, left the band after some unnoticed demos, returning to her native country of Spain. Rodrigo Aboitiz and Andrés Bobe were soon joined by bassist Luciano Rojas and drummer Mauricio Claveria. However, the group lacked a main vocalist and decided to try a saxophonist named Iván Delgado. They soon realized that he was not the right man for the job and decided to part ways with him.

At this time, Beto Cuevas was touring Chile to meet the country where he was born. Cueva's sister knew Clavería's sister, and Clavería decided to tell the band that Cuevas was his cousin, so he could get a chance. They quickly realized that Cuevas was their man and decided to include him in the band, which solidified the original group.

After the formation of the group, they were invited to record their first album. The composition was done almost entirely by Bobe, with the participation of Cuevas on the lyrics of one song, and with some collaboration from the other members in the final phase. Soon, 500 copies of the album were released. However, the producer of the album, Carlos Fonseca, and the band got into a legal battle. Since they lacked a contract, the band left him.

=== Reissue disputes ===
A reissue of Desiertos was originally planned for release in 1999 (prior to the 2000 release their album Uno). However, negotiations between Cuevas and former producer Fonseca failed to reach an agreement due to Fonseca's refusal in selling the Desiertos master recording. New attempts were made again in 2005, and this time it was Fonseca that offered to do so but then again plans had failed due to La Ley's break up that year. In 2015, Germán Bobe, the brother of the deceased band founder and guitarist Andrés Bobe (who died in 1994) along with former members Luciano Rojas and Rodrigo Aboitiz made their attempts to reissue the material but when Cuevas found out about the idea, he immediately opposed alleging that his line-up of La Ley were in the process of releasing the 2016 album Adaptación.

In a 2013 interview Cuevas stated that he himself had legally obtained all of the intellectual property rights of La Ley with consent of its previous members, thus himself becoming the sole proprietor.

== Track listing ==
No.	Title	Writer(s)	Length
1.	"Desiertos"	Bobe, Delgado, Aboitiz	3:46
2.	"Qué Va a Suceder"	Bobe, Delgado, Aboitiz	4:06
3.	"Sad"	Bobe, Aboitiz, Rojas, Delgado	3:48
4.	"Sintiendo Cosas"	Bobe, Aboitiz, Rojas, Delgado	4:14
5.	"Azuela"	Bobe, Cuevas	3:26
6.	"Espina Feroz"	Bobe, Rojas, Cuevas	4:06
7.	"Razones Vivas"	Cuevas, Bobe, Aboitiz	3:41
8.	"Bomba de Tiempo"	Bobe, Rojas, Delgado	3:23
9.	"Instrumental"	Bobe, Aboitiz, Rojas, Clavería, Cuevas	3:47
10.	"Hay Algo Allá Afuera"	Bobe, Rojas, Delgado	4:45

== Personnel ==
- Alberto "Beto" Cuevas - vocals
- Andres Bobé - guitars
- Rodrigo Aboitiz - keyboard
- Luciano Rojas - bass
- Mauricio Clavería - drums
