= Leye =

Leye or LEYE may refer to:

== People ==
- An Leye (born 1970), Tibetan-Australian poet
- Christian Leye (born 1981), German politician
- Femi Leye (born 1989), Nigerian musician
- Goddy Leye (1965–2011), Cameroonian artist and intellectual
- Jean-Marie Léyé (1932–2004), President of Vanuatu
- Mbaye Leye (born 1982), soccer football striker from Senegal
- Wilderich Freiherr Ostman von der Leye (1923–1990), German politician

== Places ==
- Leye, Alishan (樂野), a village in Chiayi County, Taiwan
- Leye County (乐业县), Guangxi, PRC China

== Businesses ==
- Lettuce Entertain You Enterprises, an American restaurant group based in Chicago

== See also ==
- Ley (disambiguation)
- Leyes (disambiguation)
- Leyens (disambiguation)
