= La Ley (EP) =

EP by La Ley
- Released: 1988
- Recorded: February – April 1988; Estudios Horizonte (Santiago, Chile)
- Genre: Rock/Pop
- Length: 44:31
- Label: EMI Music
- Producer: Carlos Fonseca

La Ley chronology
La Ley (1988)	Desiertos (1990)

Singles from Desiertos
- 1. "Sólo Un Juego" Released: 1988; 2. "La Luna" Released: 1988

La Ley is a cassette EP released in 1988 with six songs and four remixes. The executive management was in charge of Carlos Fonseca and EMI label. This album was unofficial because it was for the band became known before releasing their first album and make sure that the group would be successful in a few years. Later, even after internationalize that purpose was fulfilled. The group had the same manager of Los Prisioneros who charge professionalize the band did. This is the only job where Shía Arbulú appears.

The group decided to spread a first single "La Luna" as vinyl side B song "Sólo Un Juego" to project into a stable job. This album has not video clips.

The cassette was also released on 5 discs promotional vinyl 45 with two songs each that completed all the songs.

== Track listing ==
No.	Title	Writer(s)	Length
1.	"Sólo Un Juego"	Arbulú, Bobe, Aboitiz	4:28
2.	"La Luna"	Arbulú, Bobe, Aboitiz	3:57
3.	"A Veces"	Arbulú, Bobe, Aboitiz	3:36
4.	"Buscándote"	Arbulú, Bobe, Aboitiz	3:25
5.	"Ángel"	Arbulú, Bobe, Aboitiz	4:01
6.	"Sígueme"	Arbulú, Bobe, Aboitiz	4:35
7.	"La Luna" (Remix)	Arbulú, Bobe, Aboitiz	6:17
8.	"Sólo Un Juego" (Remix)	Arbulú, Bobe, Aboitiz	6:30
9.	"Buscándote" (Remix)	Arbulú, Bobe, Aboitiz	4:41
10.	"Ángel" (Instrumental)	Arbulú, Bobe, Aboitiz	2:25

== Personnel ==
- Shía Arbulú - vocals
- Andrés Bobe - guitars, keyboards
- Rodrigo Aboitiz - keyboards
