= Hugh Ley =

English physician

- Born: 1790; Abingdon, Berkshire
- Died: 24 January 1837 (aged 46–47); Stilton, Huntingdonshire
- Occupation: Physician

Hugh Ley (1790 – 24 January 1837) was an English physician.

== Biography ==
Ley was born in 1790 at Abingdon, Berkshire, where his father, Hugh Ley (1762–1826), was for a time a medical practitioner, afterwards settling at St. Ives, Cornwall. Hugh was educated at Dr. John Lemprière's school in his native town; subsequently became a student of the then united medical schools of St. Thomas's and Guy's Hospitals in Southwark, and took the diploma of the College of Surgeons. He then studied at Edinburgh, where he graduated M.D. 24 June 1813. His graduation thesis was on the pathology of phthisis. On 30 Sept. 1818 he was admitted a licentiate of the College of Physicians of London, and began practice in London as a man midwife. He was elected physician to the Westminster Lying-in Hospital, and soon afterwards became lecturer on midwifery at the Middlesex Hospital. On 20 April 1835 he accepted the unanimous invitation of the staff of St. Bartholomew's Hospital to deliver the lectures on midwifery in their school. His course was the first delivered in the summer, it having before been the general custom of the medical schools of London to have no regular classes except in the winter. In 1836 he published ‘An Essay on Laryngismus Stridulus, or Crouplike Inspiration of Infants,’ a volume of 480 pages. The first accurate clinical description of the disease in England is contained in the ‘Commentaries on the Diseases of Children’ (1815) of Dr. John Clarke (pt. i. p. 86), but Ley's is the first book containing a full pathological discussion of the malady. He endeavours to prove that the spasm of the larynx, which is its characteristic symptom, is caused by the pressure of enlarged lymphatic glands on the recurrent laryngeal nerve. Subsequent experience has shown that in many cases no enlarged glands are present, and the fact that the book records numerous deaths from the disease shows that its author had confused cases of tubercular meningitis with those of laryngismus stridulus, a disorder now known to be rarely, if ever, fatal. The book shows much industry, but is too long and not clear. His thesis, printed at Edinburgh in 1813, is his only other publication. He lived in Half-Moon Street, London, but died, from heart disease, at Stilton, Huntingdonshire, 24 January 1837.
