= MTV Unplugged (La Ley album) =

Live album by La Ley
- Released: September 4, 2001
- Recorded: June 28, 2001
- Venue: MTV Miami Broadcast Center
- Genre: Latin rock, alternative rock
- Length: 70:26
- Label: WEA
- Producer: Humberto Gatica

La Ley chronology
Uno (1999)	MTV Unplugged (2001)	Libertad (2003)

Singles from MTV Unplugged
- 1. "Mentira" Released: 2001; 2. "El Duelo (feat. Ely Guerra)" Released: 2001; 3. "Intenta Amar" Released: 2002

Professional ratings
Review scores
Source	Rating
Allmusic	3/5 stars

In 2001, Chilean rock band La Ley participated in MTV's Unplugged series in Miami, Florida, US. The album MTV Unplugged contains the recordings of the live concert and is to this date the band's best selling album, with sales of 1.5 million copies worldwide.

The album emphasizes the band's alt-rock 1990s material rather than their 1980s pop rock sound. Mexican singer Ely Guerra is featured as a guest singer on "El duelo". La Ley is augmented for this appearance with more musicians and a string section.

== Track listing ==
No.	Title	Writer(s)	Length
1.	"Animal" (from album Invisible, 1995)	Andrés Bobe, Mauricio Clavería, Beto Cuevas	5:45
2.	"Dia Cero" (from album Invisible, 1995)	Rodrigo Aboitiz, Cuevas	5:17
3.	"Mentira" (previously unreleased)	Cuevas	4:48
4.	"Prisioneros de la Piel" (from album Doble Opuesto, 1991)	Bobe, Cuevas	3:40
5.	"Hombre" (from album Invisible, 1995)	Aboitiz, Cuevas, Pedro Frugone	4:09
6.	"Krazyworld" (from album Vértigo, 1998)	Clavería, Cuevas, Frugone, Luciano Rojas	4:08
7.	"Intenta Amar" (previously unreleased)	Cuevas, Nova	4:51
8.	"El Duelo (feat. Ely Guerra)" (from album Invisible, 1995)	Bobe, Cuevas, Rojas	5:28
9.	"The Corridor" (from album Invisible, 1995)	Aboitiz, Cuevas	5:17
10.	"Aquí" (from album Uno, 2000)	Cuevas, Rojas	3:36
11.	"Delirando" (from album Uno, 2000)	Clavería, Cuevas, Frugone, Nova	3:52
12.	"Cielo Market" (from album Invisible, 1995)	Clavería, Cuevas, Frugone, Rojas	3:50
13.	"La Luna" (previously unreleased)	Cuevas	2:32
14.	"Fuera de Mi" (from album Uno, 2000)	Cuevas, Nova	4:58
15.	"Paraiso" (from album Uno, 2000)	Cuevas	2:47
16.	"Al Final" (from album Uno, 2000)	Clavería, Cuevas, Frugone, Nova	5:19
Total length:			70:26

== Charts ==
Chart (2001)	Peak position
US Top Latin Albums (Billboard)	13
US Latin Pop Albums (Billboard)	5
US Heatseekers Albums (Billboard)	45

== Sales and certifications ==
Region	Certification	Certified units/sales
Argentina (CAPIF)	3× Platinum	120,000^{^}
Mexico (AMPROFON)	3× Platinum	450,000^{^}
United States (RIAA)	Platinum (Latin)	100,000^{^}
^{^} Shipments figures based on certification alone.

== Personnel ==
=== La Ley ===
- Mauricio Clavería - Drums
- Beto Cuevas - Vocals, guitar
- Pedro Frugone - Guitar

=== Others ===
- Richard Bravo - Percussion
- Juan Coderch - Percussion
- Archie Frugone - Bass guitar
- Ely Guerra - Vocals, guitar
- Natisse "Bambi" Jones - Backing vocals
- Kenny O'Brian - Backing vocals
- Giza Vatcky - Backing vocals
- Peter Wallace - Keyboards
- Toshi Yanagi - Guitar
- Matthew Della Polla and the Miami Strings - Strings
