= Leys =

Leys may refer to:

== People ==
- Colin Leys (born 1931), Oxford academic
- Franco Leys (born 1993), Argentine footballer
- Jan August Hendrik Leys (1815–1869), Belgian painter
- Lenaert Leys, better known as Leonardus Lessius (1554–1623), Belgian Jesuit and moral theologian
- Simon Leys, pen name of Pierre Ryckmans
- Sally Leys, Canadian spongiologist

== Other uses ==
- Blackbird Leys, civil parish in Oxford, England
- Beaumont Leys, electoral ward in England
- Ley line, places of geographical and historic interest
- The Leys School, school in Cambridge
- Loch of Leys, ancestral home of Burnett of Leys, a Lowland Scottish clan

== See also ==
- Ley (disambiguation)
