= LEY =

LEY may refer to:

- Lelystad Airport, The Netherlands; IATA airport code: LEY
- Leyland railway station, England; National Rail station code: LEY
- Leyte, Philippines; ISO provincial code: LEY
- Leyton tube station, England; London Underground station code: LEY

== See also ==
- Ley (disambiguation)
