= Libertad (La Ley album) =

Studio album by La Ley
- Released: September 27, 2003
- Recorded: 2002–2003
- Genre: Rock, pop rock
- Label: WEA
- Producer: Humberto Gatica

La Ley chronology
La Ley MTV Unplugged (2001)	Libertad (2003)	Historias e Histeria (2004)

Singles from Libertad
- 1. "Ámate y Sálvate" Released: 2003; 2. "Más Allá" Released: 2003; 3. "Mi Ley" Released: 2004

Professional ratings
Review scores
Source	Rating
Allmusic	2/5 stars

Libertad is La Ley's seventh studio album. It was inspired primarily by the September 11 attacks. The album contains the hits "Ámate y Sálvate", "Más allá" and "Mi Ley". This is the band's second studio album as a trio.

== Album theme ==
The album's main theme is based on the September 11 attacks and its subsequent effects. Beto Cuevas also used different societal factors as themes for the songs. Most of the songs are about the search for liberty (expressing it the songs "Libertad" and "Ámate y Sálvate") while others talk about the world in which we are living today ("Y Los Demás"). Other songs deal with the corruption of politicians ("¿Sabes Quien Eres?") and a little about the world today ("Esa Es La Verdad" and "Mi Ley.")

Aside from the more political topics, some of the songs have more relatable themes, such as never giving up on goals ("Durar Hasta el Final"). The album also tells various stories with topics such as suicide ("Más Allá"), long-distance relationships ("Surazul") and the story of a girl that searches for revenge on her cheaters ("Hotel Malibú"). The album also talks about the preoccupation with the Twin Towers attack, directly on ("En Casa"). The album closes with a song expressing the desire for a perfect world ("Mundo Ideal").

== Commercial performance ==
In Chile and Argentina, the album sold well, eventually earning Gold status in the latter, however, sales in all markets were generally low in comparison to their previous three studio albums.

Despite low sales in the United States, Libertad still managed to win the 2004 Latin Grammy Award for Best Rock Performance by a Group or Duo.

== Aftermath ==
This would be the last studio album by the band before their breakup in 2005, however, new material would still be released after this album, as the compilation Historias e Histeria would include the songs “Mirate”, “Histeria”, and “Bienvenido al Anochecer”, all of which were released as singles.

The band would not release any new material until 2016, with the release of Adaptación.

== Track listing ==
No.	Title	Writer(s)	Length
1.	"Ámate y Sálvate"	Beto Cuevas, Humberto Gatica	4:23
2.	"Esa Es La Verdad"	Cuevas	4:29
3.	"Libertad"	Cuevas	4:47
4.	"Y Los Demás"	Mauricio Clavería, Cuevas, Pedro Frugone, Archie Frugone	3:08
5.	"Durar Hasta El Final"	Cuevas	4:58
6.	"Más Allá"	Cuevas, Desmond Child	4:55
7.	"¿Sabes Quién Eres?"	Clavería, Cuevas, A. Frugone	4:26
8.	"En Casa"	Cuevas	5:12
9.	"Surazul"	Cuevas, Luciano Rojas	5:25
10.	"Mi Ley"	Cuevas, Lerner	4:38
11.	"Hotel Malibú"	Cuevas	4:52
12.	"Mundo Ideal"	Cuevas, Lerner	5:36

== Charts ==
Chart (2003)	Peak position
US Top Latin Albums (Billboard)	12
US Latin Pop Albums (Billboard)	5
US Heatseekers Albums (Billboard)	48

== Sales and certifications ==
Region	Certification	Certified units/sales
Argentina (CAPIF)	Gold	20,000^{^}
Mexico	—	60,000
^{^} Shipments figures based on certification alone.

== Personnel ==
=== La Ley ===
- Mauricio Clavería - Drums
- Beto Cuevas - Vocalist
- Pedro Frugone - Lead Guitar

=== Guests ===
- Archie Frugone - Bass
- Andres Sylleros- keyboard
