= Lei =

Lei(s) or variation may refer to:

== Arts and culture ==
- Lei (garland), a Hawaiian flower necklace
- Lei (TV channel), a defunct Italian satellite broadcast
- Lei Wulong, a fictional character from the Tekken gaming franchise

== Businesses and organisations ==
- L.E.I., an American fashion brand for girls
- LEI Wageningen UR, a Dutch research institute
- Lashkar-e-Islam (LeI), a Pakistani jihadist group
- Leiden University, public research university in the Netherlands

== Economics and finance ==
- Lei, plural of the currency Leu, referring to either:
  - Moldovan leu
  - Romanian leu
- Legal Entity Identifier, a system to track all parties to a financial security transaction
- Index of Leading Economic Indicators

== People ==
- Lei (surname) (Chinese: 雷; pinyin: Léi)
- A female given name (Chinese: 蕾; pinyin: Lěi)
- A male given name (Chinese: 雷; pinyin: Léi)
- Lei Learmont, American politician

== Places ==
- Almería Airport, Spain (IATA code: LEI)
- Lei, Italy, a small town in Sardinia
- Lago di Lei, an artificial lake on the Italian–Swiss border
- Leicestershire, a county in central England (Chapman code: LEI)
  - Leicester railway station (GBR code: LEI)

== Science and technology ==
- Leis, a ladybeetle genus now included in Harmonia
- Lotus Enterprise Integrator, a Lotus Domino software application
- Low-energy ion scattering (LEIS), a technique used to characterize the chemical and structural makeup of materials

== Other uses ==
- Lei (vessel), a type of ancient Chinese earthenware wine jar
- Lessico etimologico italiano, an etymological dictionary of Italian
- Leis (mythology)

== See also ==
- Ley (disambiguation)
