= La Ley (publisher) =

Argentinian law publisher

- Parent company: Thomson Reuters
- Founded: pre-World War II
- Country of origin: Argentina
- Nonfiction topics: Law
- Official website: laley.com.ar

La Ley is an Argentinian law publisher that has existed since before World War II. Since October 2000, it has been a member of the Thomson Legal & Regulatory group within The Thomson Corporation (reorganized in October 2006 as Thomson International Legal and Regulatory).
