= Principality of Leyen =

Principality (1806–1814)

Principality of Leyen Fürstentum Leyen (German)
- 1806–1814
- Flag Coat of arms

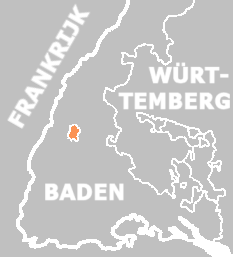
- The Principality of Leyen, as shown within the Grand Duchy of Baden
- Status: Client state of the French Empire; Member of the Confederation of the Rhine
- Capital: Hohengeroldseck
- Government: Principality
- Prince
- Historical era: Napoleonic Wars
  - County of Adendorf raised to principality: 1806
  - Mediatised to Austria by Congress of Vienna: 1814
  - Granted to Baden: 1819
Preceded by	Succeeded by
County of Adendorf	Austrian Empire

The Principality of Leyen was a Napoleonic German state which existed from 1806 to 1814 in Hohengeroldseck, in the west of modern Baden-Württemberg. The House of Leyen had acquired many districts in western Germany, and eventually these were inherited by the Leyen line of counts at Adendorf. In 1797, France defeated the Holy Roman Empire and all lands west of the Rhine were lost. Following the defeat of Austria in December 1805, most of the smaller German princely states were mediatized, with the glaring exception of Leyen, which was spared because the ruling Count was nephew to Archchancellor Karl Theodor von Dalberg, a close collaborator of Napoleon's.

In 1806, Count Philip Francis of Adendorf was raised to a Prince, and his lands were renamed to the 'Principality of Leyen'. The territory formed an enclave surrounded by Baden. Prince Philip Francis, like many other members of the Confederation of the Rhine became largely a French puppet, so following Napoleon's defeat at the Battle of Leipzig in 1813, the Congress of Vienna opted to mediatize his realm and give it to Austria. In 1819, Austria traded it to Baden.

== Prince of Leyen ==
- Philip Francis (1806–14), previously count of Adendorf

=== Heads of the House after Mediatization ===
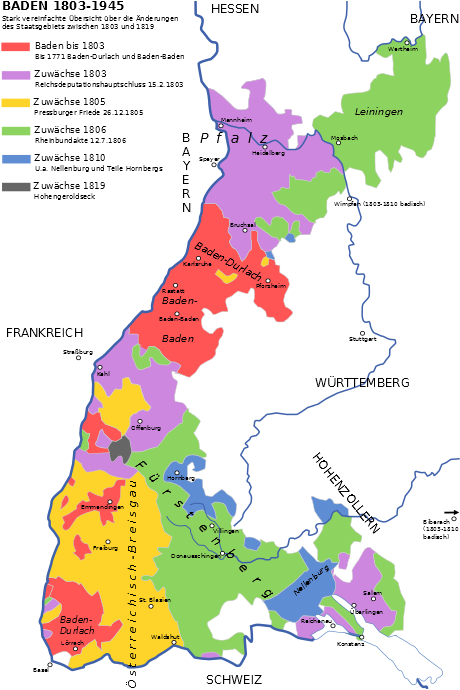
Map illustrating the growth of the Grand Duchy of Baden, with the Principality of Leyen in grey, mid-left

- Philip Franz, 1st Prince 1806-1829 (1766-1829)
  - Erwein, 2nd Prince 1829-1879 (1798-1879)
    - Philip, 3rd Prince 1879-1882 (1819-1882)
      - Erwein, 4th Prince 1895-1938 (1863-1938)
        - Erwein, 5th Prince 1938-1970 (1894-1970)
          - Wolfram Erwein, Hereditary Prince of Leyen and zu Hohengeroldseck (1924-1945)
          - Princess Marie-Adelheid (1932-2015)
            - Philipp Erwein, 7th Prince 1971–present (b.1967)
              - Wolfram, Hereditary Prince of Leyen and zu Hohengeroldseck (b.1990)
                - Prince Roch (b.2018)
              - Prince Georg (b.1992)
                - Prince Leo (b.2016)
                - Prince Antonius (b.2018)
        - Ferdinand, 6th Prince 1970-1971 (1898-1971)
