= La Ley (album) =

Studio album by La Ley
- Released: February 6, 1993
- Recorded: March–September 1992; Estudios Sonus; Santiago, Chile
- Genre: Rock, pop
- Length: 45:54
- Label: PolyGram Chile
- Producer: Alejandro Sanfuentes

La Ley chronology
Doble Opuesto (1991)	La Ley (1993)	Cara de Dios (1994)

Singles from La Ley
- 1. "Tejedores de Ilusión" Released: December 14, 1992; 2. "Auto-Ruta (Feel the Skin)" Released: May 3, 1993

Professional ratings
Review scores
Source	Rating
Allmusic	(unrated) link

La Ley is the band's third album. It was produced by Alejandro Sanfuentes and released in February 1993 by Polygram. The album includes the number one hits "Tejedores de Ilusión" (which was used in a nationwide Pepsi campaign in Chile) and "Auto-Ruta (Feel the Skin)", whose music video was banned from some television shows such as Canal 13's Más Música because of explicit content.

== Track listing ==
No.	Title	Writer(s)	Length
1.	"Tejedores de Ilusión"	Bobe, Cuevas	4:15
2.	"Auto-Ruta (Feel the Skin)"	Bobe, Cuevas	4:31
3.	"Si Tú No Estás Aquí"	Bobe	3:04
4.	"Decadencia"	Bobe, Cuevas	4:41
5.	"Por Un Binocular"	Bobe, Cuevas, Rojas	4:56
6.	"Roces"	Bobe, Cuevas, Rojas	5:16
7.	"I.L.U."	Bobe	4:31
8.	"Bon Voyage"	Bobe, Cuevas	4:42
9.	"Plegarias"	Bobe, Cuevas, Rojas	5:10
10.	"Proyecto Ser"	Bobe	4:39

== Personnel ==
=== La Ley ===
- Andrés Bobe – guitar
- Mauricio Clavería – drums
- Alberto "Beto" Cuevas – vocals
- Luciano Rojas – bass

=== Others ===
- Alejandro Sanfuentes – producer
