= House of Leyen =

German noble family

Leyen family coat of arms

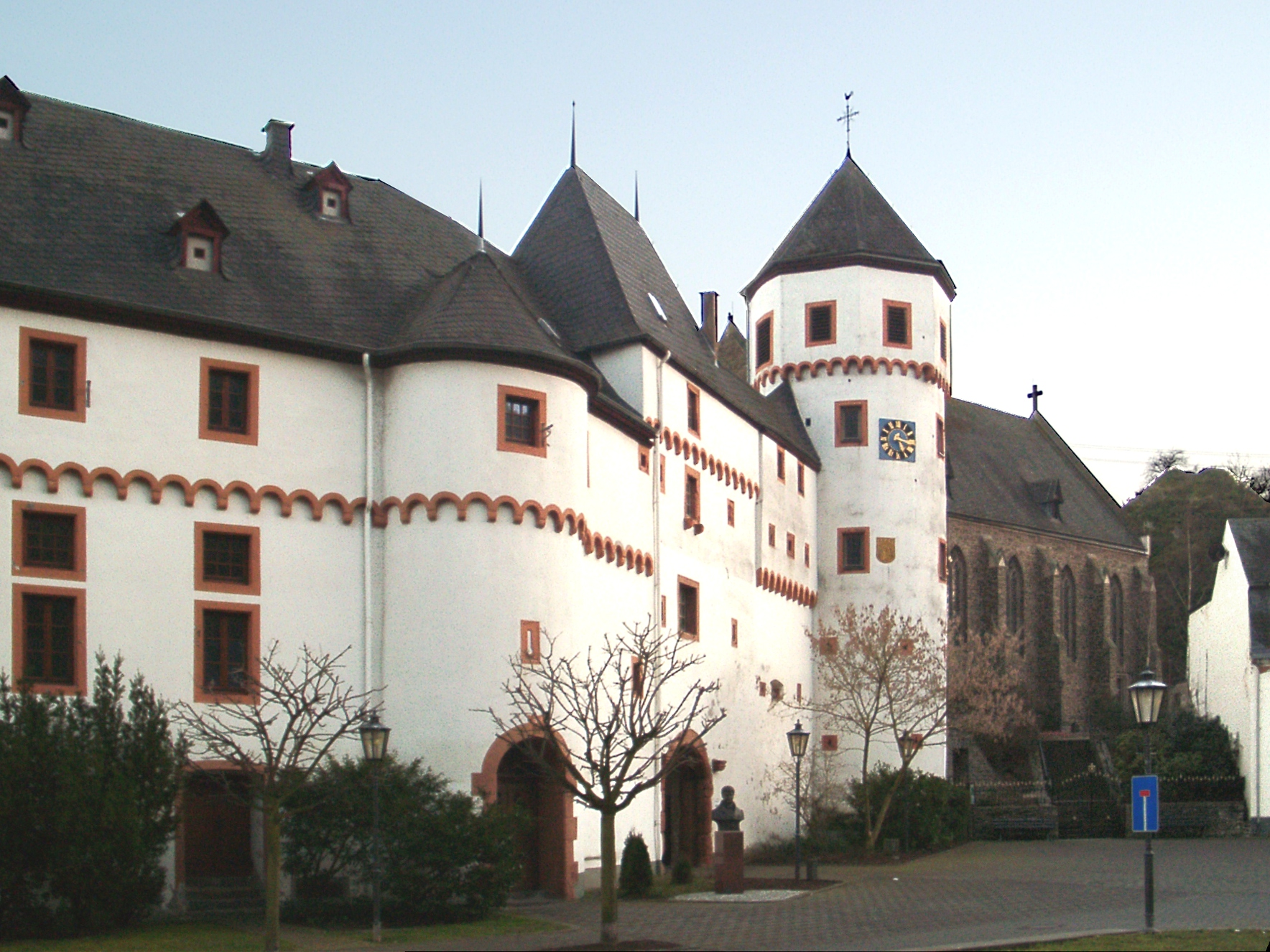
Schloss Gondorf, the original family seat

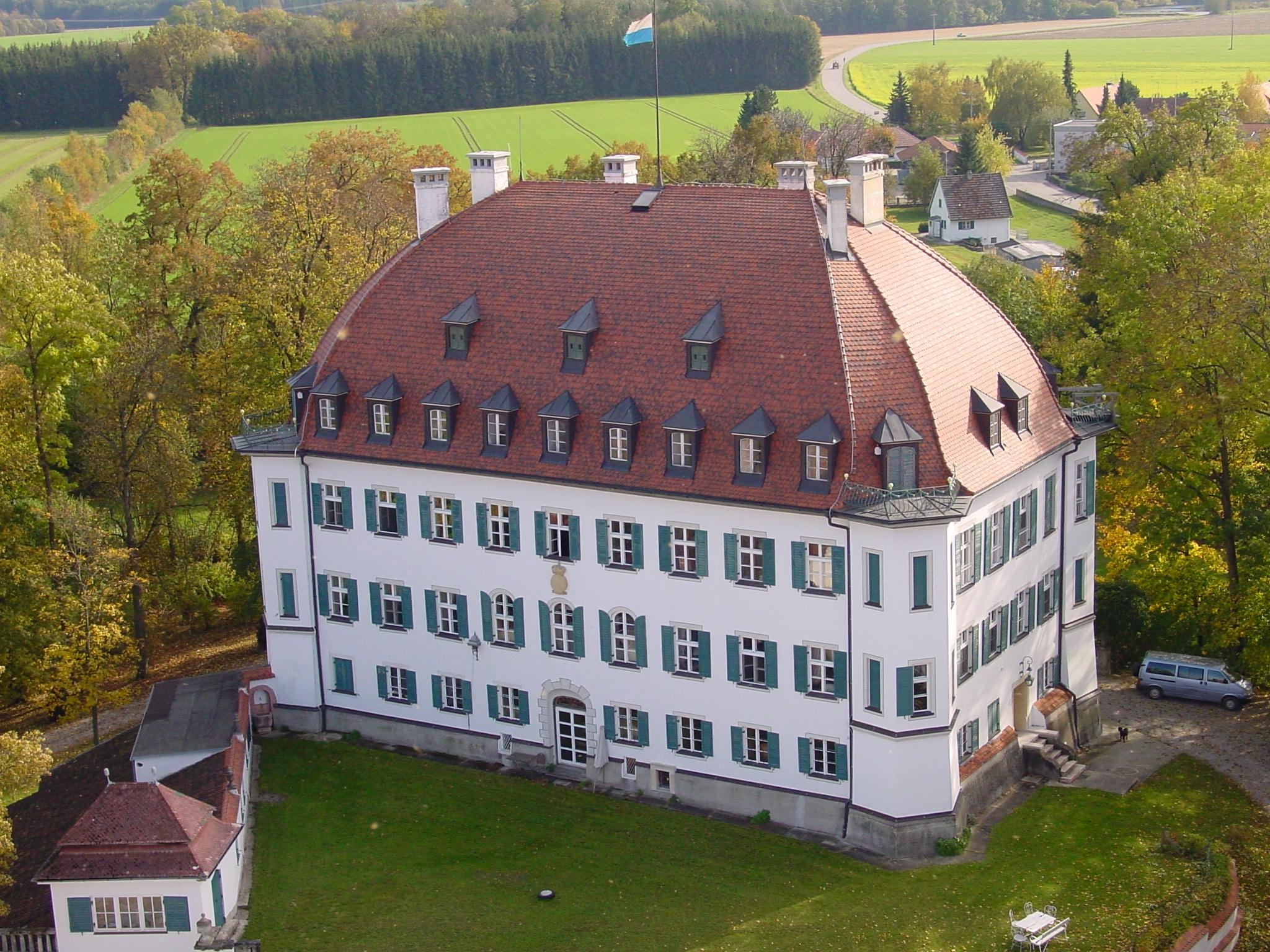
Waal Castle, Bavaria, family seat since 1820

The House of Leyen-Hohengeroldseck is an ancient German noble family of princely and historically sovereign rank. As a former ruling and mediatized family, it belongs to the Hochadel (high nobility).

== History ==
The origin can be traced to the middle of the 10th century, which had estates on the Moselle. Originally the family was named de Petra or by its castle in Gondorf (Cunthereve). Since the 14th century it has called itself von der Leyen. Its members had the hereditary office of sénéchal in the Electorate of Trier. They also had Adendorf near Bonn, Leiningen on the Hunsrück, the Lordship of Arenfels and St. Ingbert.

Prior to 1660, Hugo Ernst (line Leyen-Adendorf) became Lord of Blieskastel and, in 1657, was created Reichsfreiherr (Imperial baron) von der Leyen. In addition to its scattered territories the family acquired the lordships of Burresheim and Blieskastel before 1660, where it built a residence around 1760. In 1697 Freiherr Karl Caspar received the county of Hohengeroldseck as a fiefdom from Austria. In 1711 he was created Imperial count (Reichsgraf) von der Leyen und zu Hohengeroldseck. With most of the count's territories lost to Napoleon France, Reichsgraf Philipp Franz still retained the county Geroldseck. Upon joining the Rheinbund in 1806, he was created Fürst (prince) von der Leyen. His mother's brother was Karl Theodor Anton Maria von Dalberg, who later became Prince-Primate of the Confederation of the Rhine and Grand Duke of Frankfurt. In 1819 the principality's holdings were mediatized under Baden, although the title is still being nominally held by House von der Leyen.

Two members of the family became Archbishop of Trier:

- 1556–1567 Prince Elector Johann von der Leyen
- 1652–1676 Prince Elector Karl Kaspar von der Leyen-Hohengeroldseck

and one Archbishop of Mainz:

- 1675–1678 Prince Elector and Archchancellor of the Holy Roman Empire Damian Hartard von der Leyen-Hohengeroldseck

Erwein Otto Philipp Prince von der Leyen (1894–1970), died without male issue, but left his title and property to his grandson, Baron (Freiherr) Philipp-Erwein IV von Freyberg zu Eisenberg (born 1967), 7th Prince von der Leyen und zu Hohengeroldseck. He will be succeeded by Wolfram, Hereditary Prince of Leyen and zu Hohengeroldseck (b.1990). Prince Philipp-Erwein IV the current head of the family is descended, amongst others, from Frederick II, Holy Roman Emperor, Vsevolod I of Kyiv, Hugh Capet, Eric the Victorious, Harold Godwinson, Pope Julius II and Pope Paul III.

In August 2026, the reigning House of Liechtenstein announced the engagement of Prince Georg Antonius of Liechtenstein (born 1999), the second son of Hereditary Prince Alois of Liechtenstein, to Maria-Nives Princess von der Leyen und zu Hohengeroldseck (born 2001), daughter of Philipp Erwein. The wedding is scheduled to take place in late summer 2027.

The members of the House of Leyen are entitled a formal style of Address using the predicate Serene Highness. Although German law no longer acknowledges or recognizes a status for noble houses or their titles per se, the government does allow for titles to be used in lieu of a surname.

== See also ==
- Fürst von der Leyen und zu Hohengeroldseck
- Principality of Leyen
- Von der Leyen (family from Krefeld), silk weaver industrialists in the 19th century, later with baronial rank.
