= Invisible (La Ley album) =

Studio album by La Ley
- Released: 28 July 1995
- Recorded: September–December 1994; Record Plant Studios (Hollywood, California)
- Genres: Alternative rock; gothic rock
- Length: 50:03
- Label: Warner Music México
- Producer: Humberto Gatica

La Ley chronology
La Ley de La Ley (1994)	Invisible (1995)	Vértigo (1998)

Singles from Invisible
- 1. "El Duelo" Released: 21 June 1995; 2. "Día Cero" Released: 13 September 1995; 3. "Hombre" Released: 31 October 1995; 4. "Cielo Market" Released: 9 January 1996; 5. "1-800 Dual" Released: 15 April 1996

Invisible is La Ley's fourth album. It is their second best selling album. The album reunites La Ley again with Rodrigo Aboitiz and invites a new member, Pedro Furgone, after the death of founder Andrés Bobe. The album begins the dark era of La Ley. It was also La Ley's first album to have a song completely in French ("Deuxième Fois").

The album contains the number one hits "El Duelo", "Día Cero", and "Cielo Market".

== Backstory and Reception ==
In 1994, Bobe died in a motorbike accident, an event that brought the group to a major crossroad. It was Beto Cuevas who ultimately became most prominent in the group as it weathered the disaster. He assumed the dual function of bandleader and spokesperson, steering the band through the catastrophe. Some months passed before the band regenerated to the form of a quintet once again, featuring Cuevas, Rojas, and Clavería, with new a guitarist, Pedro Frugone, and La Ley's former keyboard player, Aboitiz, who rejoined the group at that time.

Bobe continued to influence the band even after his death. Beto Cuevas says that Bobe came to him in a dream and when Cuevas asked how he could complete the currently unfinished album if Bobe was dead, Andrés responded, "You can see me, but to the rest of the world I am just invisible." This was the direct inspiration for Beto to write songs such as "Invisible" and "Día Cero." As a result, in 1995 Invisible was released (production was delayed until 1994) with the first single "El Duelo" which exceed the expectations of the band and quickly rose to the top spot in most of the billboard charts in Latin America, particularly in their native Chile, Mexico and Spain.

The band's reputation began to spread quickly, and they moved to Mexico in an attempt to further their success. Shortly after, they released the single "Día Cero" which was an immediate success and to this day is considered to be one of the group's most successful singles. After some time, they released the third single "Hombre", which included images from a recent United States tour.

For the first and only time on 1996, La Ley released two more singles ("Cielo Market" and "1-800 Dual"), bringing the total to five.

The album is their second-best-selling album, behind La Ley MTV Unplugged. The album sold 400,000 copies within its first few months in Mexico alone.

== Track listing ==
1. "Animal" (Bobe, Cuevas, Claveria) - 5:59
2. "Día Cero" (Cuevas, Aboitiz) - 4:32
3. "El Duelo" (Bobe, Cuevas, Rojas) - 3:14
4. "Deuxième Fois" (Cuevas, Aboitiz) - 3:59
5. "Hombre" (Cuevas, Frugone, Aboitiz) - 4:04
6. "R&R" (Bobe, Cuevas, Clavería) - 4:00
7. "Invisible" (Cuevas, Frugone, Rojas) - 4:00
8. "Fausto" (Cuevas, Rojas, Claveria, Aboitiz, Frugone) - 5:17
9. "Cielo Market" (Cuevas, Rojas, Claveria, Frugone) - 3:36
10. "El Rey" (Cuevas, Frugone, Aboitiz, Rojas) - 3:52
11. "The Corridor" (Cuevas, Aboitiz) - 5:45
12. "1-800 Dual" (Bobe, Cuevas, Aboitiz) - 4:12

== Personnel ==
La Ley

- Rodrigo Aboitiz – keyboard
- Pedro Frugone – guitar
- Mauricio Clavería – drums
- Alberto "Beto" Cuevas – vocals
- Luciano Rojas – bass

Others

- Andrés Bobe - Composer on tracks (1,3,6,12)
- Ramon Villanueva – producer
- Hernan Rojas – recording engineer
- Walter Gonzalez – recording engineer
- Humberto Gatica – mix
