= Adaptación =

Studio album by La Ley
- Released: April 8, 2016
- Recorded: 2015–2016
- Genre: Rock, pop rock
- Length: 50:38
- Label: Warner Music

La Ley chronology
Retour (2014)	Adaptación (2016)

Singles from Adaptación
- 1. "Ya No Estás" Released: January 18, 2016; 2. "Reino de la Verdad" Released: June 24, 2016

Adaptación is the eighth and final studio album of the Chilean group La Ley, released on April 8, 2016. It is the first album that unites the band after a 9-year hiatus which had started in 2005. Notably thirteen years separate Adaptación of its predecessor studio album, Libertad.

The album was produced by Jean-Yves Jeeve Ducornet (co-author of the song Quiero Creer by Beto Cuevas and the promotional single Ya No Estás), Guillermo Porro and the same band.

The album has a total of 12 songs. However, in the words of the members of the band, there will be a deluxe version featuring three bonus tracks (War of Love, Prisionero Sin Palabras and Sigo Viendo). Two songs are in English (Child and Soul Chauffeur). Originally, there were plans for three, but the label asked that one be adapted into Spanish (Guerras de Amor).

On January 18, 2016, the album premiered on Latin American radio with the album's first single, Ya No Estás. A few weeks later, the band followed with the release of the video for Ya No Estás, which was staged at the renowned hotel-casino of San Francisco de Mostazal (Chile). The video, directed by Carlos Huerta, includes a brief dance performance by La Ley. The song was released during the last week of February and by the first week of March was ranked #1 in national radio rankings.

During the month of January to early March, the band also promoted the album throughout Chile with a series of concerts, beginning what would be the Adaptación Tour. This tour will take in the coming months by Mexico, Argentina, USA and other destinations on the continent.

During his stay in Chile, they performed live, in addition to the promotional single four unreleased songs: Soul Chauffeur, Child, Reino de la Verdad and El Borde.

On April 2, six days of the official release of the album, released four songs Act album through platform iTunes, which could be reproduced via streaming and / or be purchased in digital format. These songs were Ya No Estás, El Borde, Amar Para Deshacer and Tú No.

As data, La Ley said by press for Adaptación, about 35 songs, of which only 14 were chosen Beto Cuevas, lead singer of the group, then highlight were created that could include outtakes on a second album, whose appearance would within two years.

== Track listing ==
No.	Title	Writer(s)	Length
1.	"Reino de la Verdad"	Beto Cuevas	3:23
2.	"Ya No Estás"	Cuevas, Ducornet	3:58
3.	"Guerras de Amor"	Cuevas, Ducornet, Horn	3:37
4.	"Rompe el Muro"	Cuevas, Ducornet	4:07
5.	"Child"	Cuevas, Porro	3:55
6.	"El Borde"	Cuevas	4:27
7.	"Horas"	Cuevas	3:56
8.	"Amar Para Deshacer"	Cuevas	3:50
9.	"Soul Chauffeur"	Cuevas, Ducornet	4:21
10.	"Tú No"	Cuevas	3:41
11.	"Adaptación"	Cuevas	4:08
12.	"Dime Adiós"	Cuevas	6:10

Bonus Tracks

No.	Title	Writer(s)	Length
13.	"Prisionero Sin Palabras"	Cuevas, Brant
14.	"Sigo Viendo"	Cuevas
15.	"War of Love"	Cuevas, Horn

== Charts ==
Chart (2016)	Peak position
US Top Latin Albums (Billboard)	17
US Latin Pop Albums (Billboard)	6
