= Doble Opuesto =

Studio album by La Ley
- Released: October 11, 1991
- Recorded: January–August 1991; Estudios Horizonte (Santiago, Chile)
- Genre: Rock/New wave
- Length: 43:44
- Label: Polygram
- Producer: Jorge Melibosky

La Ley chronology
Desiertos (1990)	Doble Opuesto (1991)	La Ley (1993)

Singles from Doble Opuesto
- 1. "Angie" Released: June 8, 1991; 2. "Doble Opuesto" Released: August 5, 1991; 3. "Prisioneros de la Piel" Released: January 10, 1992

Professional ratings
Review scores
Source	Rating
	(?)

Doble Opuesto (Spanish: "Double Opposite") is the second album of the Chilean rock band La Ley and the first commercially successful one after their debut album, Desiertos, failed to sell. The album was released in October 1991 under the production of Jorge Melibosky. Band members for this record were Andrés Bobe (guitars), Mauricio Clavería (drums), Alberto Cuevas (vocals) and Luciano Rojas (bass). Bobe provides vocals for the song "En Lugares".

The disc includes hits like "Doble Opuesto", "Desiertos", "Prisioneros de la Piel" and a cover of The Rolling Stones' #1 single "Angie".

== Track listing ==
No.	Title	Writer(s)	Length
1.	"Doble Opuesto"	Bobe, Cuevas	4:27
2.	"Placer"	Bobe, Cuevas	4:25
3.	"En Lugares"	Bobe, Delgado	4:04
4.	"Desiertos"	Aboitiz, Bobe, Delgado	5:19
5.	"Qué Va a Suceder"	Aboitiz, Bobe, Delgado	4:22
6.	"Prisioneros de la Piel"	Aboitiz, Bobe, Cuevas	3:21
7.	"A Veces"	Arbulú, Bobe	4:41
8.	"Angie"	Jagger, Richards	4:32
9.	"Sasha"	Bobe, Cuevas, Rojas	3:48
10.	"Sólo Ideales"	Aboitiz, Bobe, Cuevas, Delgado, Rojas	4:57

== Personnel ==
- Andrés Bobe – guitar, keyboards
- Mauricio Clavería – drums
- Alberto "Beto" Cuevas – vocals
- Luciano Rojas – bass
- Jorge Melibosky – producer
- Shia Arbulu – credits on track 7
- Ivan Delgado – credits on Tracks 3,4,5,10
- Rodrigo Aboitiz - credits on Tracks 4,5,6,10
