= Waal, Bavaria =

Waal
- Municipality
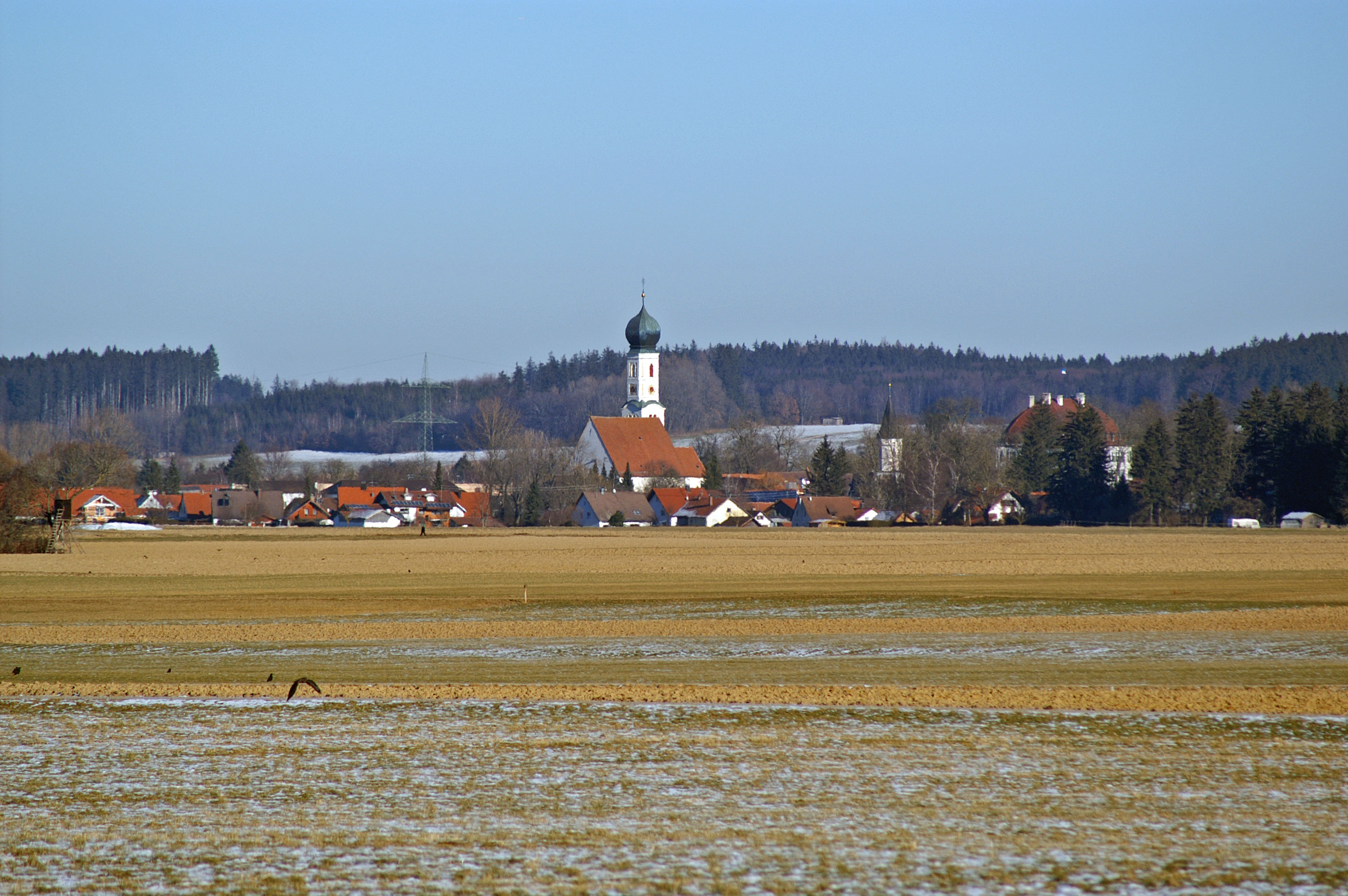
- Waal as seen from the southwest

- Coat of arms

- Location of Waal within Ostallgäu district
- Interactive map of Waal
- Location within Germany Location within Bavaria
- Coordinates: 48°0′N 10°47′E
- Country: Germany
- State: Bavaria
- Admin. region: Schwaben
- District: Ostallgäu
- Municipal assoc.: Buchloe

Government
  - Mayor (2020–26): Samuel Pertl

Area
  - Total: 27.95 km^{2} (10.79 sq mi)
- Elevation: 635 m (2,083 ft)

Population (2025-12-31)
  - Total: 2,364
  - Density: 84.58/km^{2} (219.1/sq mi)
- Time zone: UTC+01:00 (CET)
  - Summer (DST): UTC+02:00 (CEST)
- Postal codes: 86875
- Dialling codes: 08246
- Vehicle registration: OAL
- Website: www.waal.de

Waal (German pronunciation: [vaːl]) is a municipality in the district of Ostallgäu in Bavaria in Germany. The town has a municipal association with Buchloe.

== Notable people ==
- Hubert von Herkomer, artist, owner of Lululaund.
