= Vértigo (La Ley album) =

Studio album by La Ley
- Released: February 17, 1998
- Recorded: 1997–1998; Chung King, House of Metal (New York City, United States)
- Genre: Rock, pop
- Length: 50:08
- Label: WEA
- Producer: La Ley, Joe Moskowitz

La Ley chronology
Invisible (1995)	Vértigo (1998)	Uno (2000)

Singles from Vértigo
- 1. "Fotofobia" Released: October 7, 1997; 2. "Vi" Released: 1998; 3. "Tanta Ciudad" Released: February 17, 1998; 4. "Sed" Released: 1998

Professional ratings
Review scores
Source	Rating
Allmusic	link

Vértigo is La Ley's fifth album, released in 1998.

== Content and reception ==
Due to the success of Invisible, the band hardly found time to record what would be their next album. However, in 1997 they began recording and announced the album's release date for the middle of that summer, but it was later delayed until 1998. At the time, Rodrigo Aboitiz (the band's keyboardist) caused a series of troubles, missing the first weeks of recording. Generally, the album was completed with the same band members that worked on Invisible, but just before the release, Rodrigo Aboitiz left the band due to a drug problem. After the album was finished, he left the band, effectively leaving the band without a studio keyboardist.

One month before the release of the album, the first single, "Fotofobia", was released and slashed by critics. After that, the album "Vértigo" was released to little fanfare, becoming the least successful of all the band’s albums. According to the band members, they had high expectations about it, but it was proven to be a failure in comparison to Invisible. The album was notorious for its electro-industrial sounds that surprised and outraged most of the fans. Still, the album sold fairly well, as it sold 100,000 copies in Mexico. The album differs greatly from the band's other albums because of its electronic sound, and its album cover. The album’s sound draws from various genres, and can be likened to that of Nine Inch Nails.

The band released two more singles "Vi" (the album's best known song), whose video was banned from MTV for the use of guns, and the much less notorious "Tanta Ciudad". They also released the single "Sed", which did not have a video and only garnered modest airplay.

In the middle of the tour, bassist Luciano Rojas disappeared suddenly. He was replaced by J.C. Cumplido, who had to learn the songs in less than five minutes before the beginning of a concert. Fans had speculated that the band was breaking up, but Luciano left the band and brought Rodrigo Aboitiz with him to form their own band, effectively making La Ley a trio. After the end of the tour in 1999, La Ley jettisoned their darker image and began working on their album, Uno.

Though the album did not well do with sales and is often considered by many their worst record, the album's prestige has grown considerably. Some fans now consider it their best album for having such an unusual sound and a different, more experimental style. The songs "Ciclos" and "Vi" are considered by many the best songs of the album.

== "Vi" controversy ==
The music video for "Vi", directed by Argentinian Stanley, was banned from MTV Latin America because of the use of guns. This was a big shock for the band, since MTV was its biggest promoter. It also affected the sales of the record, being the first single released (although "Fotofobia" was the debut single of Vértigo, it was more like a preview of the album released several months before).

== Track listing ==
All tracks are written by Rodrigo Aboitiz, Mauricio Clavería, Beto Cuevas, Pedro Frugone, Luciano Rojas

No.	Title	Length
1.	"Fotofobia"	2:57
2.	"Guerrillero"	4:00
3.	"Vi"	4:14
4.	"X Ti"	3:47
5.	"Tanta Ciudad"	5:15
6.	"Sed"	4:24
7.	"Ciertos Civiles"	3:53
8.	"Krazyworld"	4:02
9.	"Opacidad"	5:21
10.	"Shygun"	1:59
11.	"Ciclos"	3:58
12.	"Solitaryman"	6:20
13.	"Fotofobia" (Extended Version)	4:29
Total length:		50:08

== Personnel ==
- Rodrigo Aboitiz - Keyboard
- Mauricio Clavería - Drums
- Beto Cuevas - Vocals
- Pedro Frugone - Guitar
- Luciano Rojas - Bass
