= Uno (La Ley album) =

Studio album by La Ley
- Released: 21 February 2000
- Recorded: Late 1999
- Genres: Rock, pop rock
- Length: 48:32
- Label: WEA
- Producer: Humberto Gatica

La Ley chronology
| Vértigo (1998) | Uno (2000) | La Ley MTV Unplugged (2001) |

Singles from Uno
- 1. "Aquí" Released: 5 January 2000; 2. "Eternidad" Released: 8 May 2000; 3. "Fuera de mí" Released: 14 August 12000; 4. "Paraíso" Released: 13 November 2000; 5. "Verano Espacial" Released: 15 January 2001

Uno (English: One) is the sixth studio album by Chilean rock band La Ley, released on 21 February 2000, by Warner Music Group.

== Content ==
=== Recording ===
This was the first album released by the band after the departure of Rodrigo Aboitiz and Luciano Rojas. The band went on to record this studio album as a trio, with the addition of guest Archie Frugone to record the bass tracks.

Touring bassist J.C. Cumplido returned to tour with them until his departure from the lineup in 2001. Cumplido was replaced by Archie Frugone for the remainder of the tour and beyond.

=== Style ===
Stylistically, this album was seen as a departure from the darker, more electro-industrial style of Vértigo, and the grunge-fused goth style of Invisible, adopting a more straightforward Alternative Rock sound with fewer experimental ambient sounds.

The song “Amor y Fe” goes back to the band's original new wave sound, and can be traced back to 1990, when the band was in the studio for the Desiertos sessions, ultimately being re-recorded for this album. To date, it is the last contribution from Andrés Bobe on any of the band's material, as the song was written with Bobe before his passing.

== Commercial performance ==
The album was a breakthrough success in the United States, effectively establishing the band's fan base in that country, ultimately winning the Grammy Award for Best Latin Rock/Alternative Album and reaching #41 on the Billboard Top Latin Albums.

Five singles were spawned from this album, with "Aquí", "Fuera de mí", and "Eternidad” receiving considerable airplay.

The single "Aquí" was performed at the Miss Universe 2001 pageant hosted in Bayamón, Puerto Rico being televised on CBS in the United States, Canal 13 in Chile and worldwide. As of November 2023, "Aquí" has had over 38 million streams on Spotify.

== Track listing ==
1. "Eternidad" (Beto Cuevas, Pedro Frugone) - 4:09
2. "Tierra" (Cuevas, Frugone, Mauricio Clavería) - 4:16
3. "Aquí" (Cuevas, Aldo Nova) - 4:45
4. "Fuera de Mí" (Cuevas, Nova) - 4:56
5. "Delirando" (Cuevas, Claveria, Frugone, Nova) - 3:45
6. "Amor y Fe" (Andrés Bobe, Cuevas) - 4:33
7. "Paraíso" (Cuevas) - 3:46
8. "Ritual" (Cuevas, Frugone, Clavería) - 4:04
9. "Verano Espacial" (Cuevas) - 3:52
10. "Al Final" (Cuevas, Claveria, Frugone, Nova) - 10:40
- The song "Al Final" ends at 5:10. The hidden track "Once in a Lifetime" starts at 7:35, after 2 minutes and 25 seconds of silence.

== Charts ==
| Chart (2000) | Peak position |
|---|---|
| US Top Latin Albums (Billboard) | 41 |

== Sales and certifications ==
| Region | Certification | Certified units/sales |
|---|---|---|
| Mexico (AMPROFON) | Platinum | 150,000^{^} |
| United States (RIAA) | Platinum (Latin) | 100,000^{^} |
^{^} Shipments figures based on certification alone.
