= La Ley (band) =

Chilean rock band

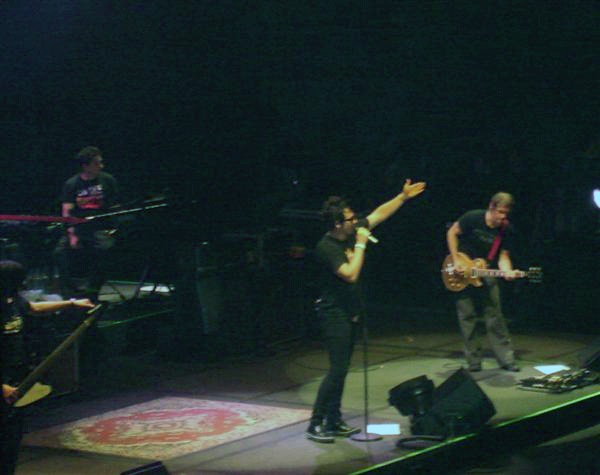

Background information
- Origin: Santiago, Chile
- Genres: Rock, alternative rock, pop rock, new wave
- Years active: 1987–2005; 2013–2016; 2023–present
- Labels: EMI Music, Polydor, Universal Music, Warner Music Group
- Members: Beto Cuevas; Mauricio Clavería; Pedro Frugone
- Past members: Andrés Bobe; Rodrigo Aboitiz; Luciano Rojas; Shia Arbulu; Ivan Delgado

La Ley (Spanish for 'The Law'; pronounced [la ˈlej]) were a Chilean rock band formed by Andrés Bobe, Rodrigo Aboitiz, Luciano Rojas and Mauricio Claveria with Beto Cuevas. The band has won one Grammy Award, two Latin Grammy Awards, three Lo Nuestro Awards and three Premios MTV Latinoamérica.

La Ley has released eight studio albums, sixteen compilation albums, two EPs, thirty-one music videos, four video albums, one live album, one double format album, one soundtrack and thirty single albums.

== History ==
After an unsuccessful first album, Desiertos (1990), they released Doble Opuesto (1991), which appears as the official first album of the band. Singles like "Desiertos," "Tejedores de Ilusión," and "Prisioneros de la Piel" made them stars in Chile, Argentina and Mexico, especially after the release of La Ley, their second recording (1993). After Bobe's death in 1994, La Ley continued with a new guitarist, Pedro Frugone, and released two more albums; in 1995, the band released Invisible, the album was their international breakout record and provided to the band their best-selling studio album to date, it included the number ones "Dia Cero" and "El Duelo".

Before the release of Vértigo, Rodrigo Aboitiz left the band. In the middle of the tour, bassist Luciano Rojas left the band as well, and together with the Aboitiz formed a new group named Saiko.

Their music became more rock and less experimental, and the musicians dropped their dark image. Not all of their fans were on board with the new style, but the last La Ley albums, Uno (2000) and Libertad (2003), consolidated the band as one of the most important in Latin America, earning it a Latin Grammy award for each of the two albums.

La Ley also performed on MTV Unplugged in 2001, and released an album of the performance, which went on to win a Grammy award. In 2004, they released a greatest hits compilation (featuring three new songs: Mírate, Bienvenido al Anochecer, and Histeria) titled Historias e Histeria.

In 2005 Rodrigo Aboitiz and Luciano Rojas performed with the band at the Viña del Mar International Song Festival (Spanish: Festival Internacional de la Canción de Viña del Mar) and after a tour around Latin America, the band dissolved in Buenos Aires on September 29, to work on their personal projects, leaving open the possibility for a return in the future. Most of the original members have since formed a group known as Dia Cero with Chilean singer Ignacio Redard.

On 22 February 2023, the official lineup for the Besame Mucho Festival was published, which took place on 2 December 2023, at Dodger Stadium in Los Angeles, California. This caused a stir among the fans of the band because the name of La Ley appeared along with other emblematic artists of Latin music with great experience. Speculations continued for a week about whether it was really a meeting between the members of La Ley after 7 years, or possibly a new composition of the band led by Cuevas.

On 1 March exactly one week after announcing the Besame Mucho Festival lineup, an official statement was published by Beto Cuevas and Mauricio Clavería on their respective Instagram accounts, confirming the band's reunion with their latest formation. official of Cuevas, Clavería and Frugone. In the same statement, it is mentioned that it is a one-time reunion for the only occasion for the mentioned festival, so no plans to work together in the future have been contemplated.

== Members ==
- Beto Cuevas - Vocals (1988–2005, 2013-2016)
- Mauricio Claveria - Drums (1988–2005, 2013-2016)
- Pedro Frugone - Guitars (1994–2005, 2013-2016)
- David Chirino - Bass (2013-2016)

== Former members ==
- Andrés Bobe - guitars/vocals (1987–1994) died in a motorcycle accident
- Rodrigo Aboitiz - keyboards (1987–1991); (1994–1998)
- Luciano Rojas - bass (1988–1999)
- Shia Arbulu - vocals (1987–1988)
- Ivan Delgado - vocals (1988)

== Discography ==
- Desiertos (1990)
- Doble Opuesto (1991)
- La Ley (1993)
- Invisible (1995)
- Vértigo (1998)
- Uno (2000)
- Libertad (2003)
- Adaptación (2016)
