= Friedrich Karl Joseph von Schönborn =

- Count of Schönborn
- Born: Friedrich Karl Joseph von Schönborn; 2 August 1781; Mainz
- Died: 24 March 1849 (aged 67); Prague, Austrian Empire
- Spouse: Maria Anna von Kerpen (m. 1811; died 1849)
- Issue: Erwein von Schönborn
- House: Schönborn
- Father: Hugo Damian Erwein von Schönborn-Wiesentheid
- Mother: Maria Anna von Stadion zu Thannhausen und Warthausen

Friedrich Karl Joseph von Schönborn (2 August 1781 – 24 March 1849) was a German aristocrat and composer.

== Early life ==
Franz Philipp Joseph was born on 2 August 1781 in the Electorate of Mainz and named after his great-grandfather's brother, Friedrich Karl von Schönborn. He was the youngest son of Count Hugo Damian Erwein von Schönborn-Wiesentheid and Countess Maria Anna von Stadion zu Thannhausen und Warthausen (1746–1817). Among his siblings were Franz Philipp von Schönborn-Buchheim (who married Countess Maria Sophie von der Leyen), Sophie Theresia von Schönborn (who married Prince Philip Francis of Leyen), Franz Erwein von Schönborn-Wiesentheid (who married Countess Fernandine of Westphalia zu Fürstenberg, daughter of Count Clemens August von Westphalen).

His paternal grandparents were Joseph Franz Bonaventura von Schönborn-Wiesentheid (only surviving son of Count Rudolf Franz Erwein von Schönborn) and Countess Bernhardine von Plettenberg.

== Career ==
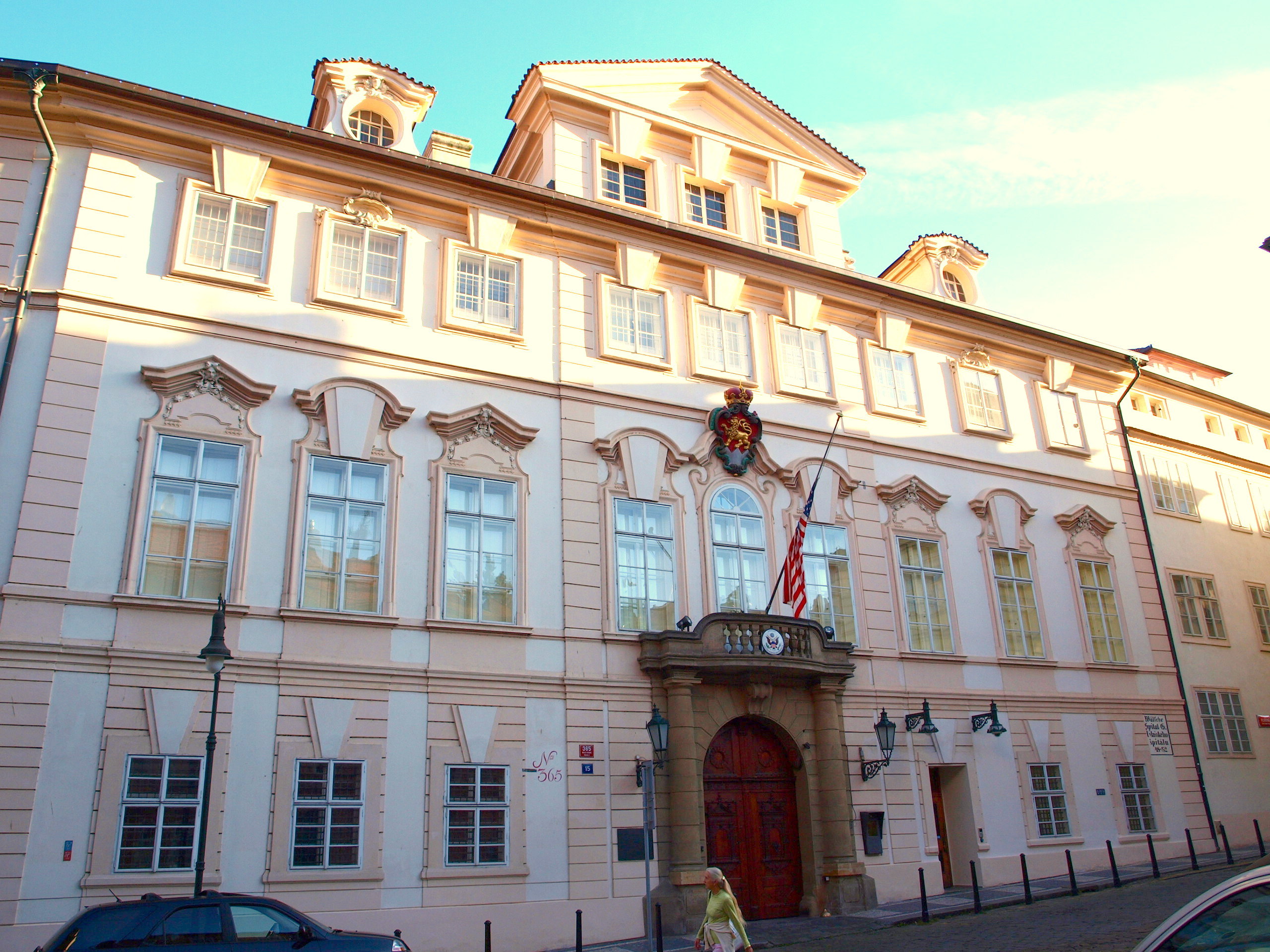
Schönborn Palace in Prague

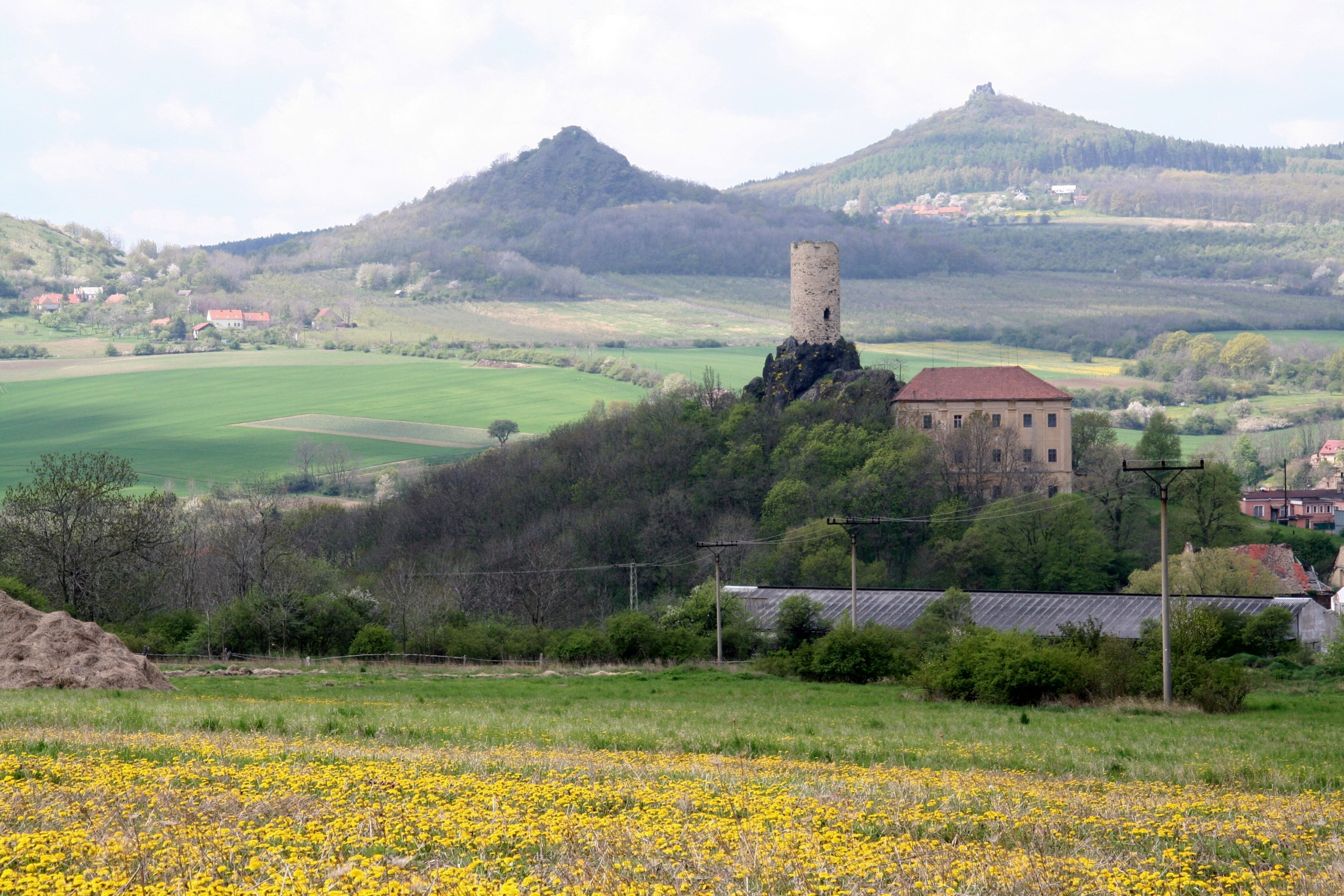
Skalka Castle, Vlastislav

Upon his father's death in 1817, the family's many estates were divided among Friedrich and his brothers. His eldest brother, Franz Philipp, who is considered the founder of the Austrian branch of the family (who became known as Schönborn-Buchheim), inherited the Göllersdorf and Weyerburg estates, in Lower Austria, and the Palais Schönborn-Batthyány in Vienna. Another brother, Franz Erwein, who is considered the founder of the Franconian branch (who became known as Schönborn-Wiesentheid), inherited castles at Wiesentheid, Pommersfelden, Gaibach, Geisenheim and the wine estates Hallburg near Volkach and Hattenheim.

Friedrich, as the youngest son, is considered the founder of the Bohemian branch, and inherited Schönborn Palace in Prague (built between 1643 and 1656 for Rudolf von Colloredo; today the U.S. embassy), and Skalka Castle (in today's Czech Republic which remained in the family until expropriation by the communists in 1946). He served as Chamberlain and Hereditary Cupbearer.

Like his ancestor, Rudolf Franz Erwein von Schönborn, he was a noted composer.

== Personal life ==
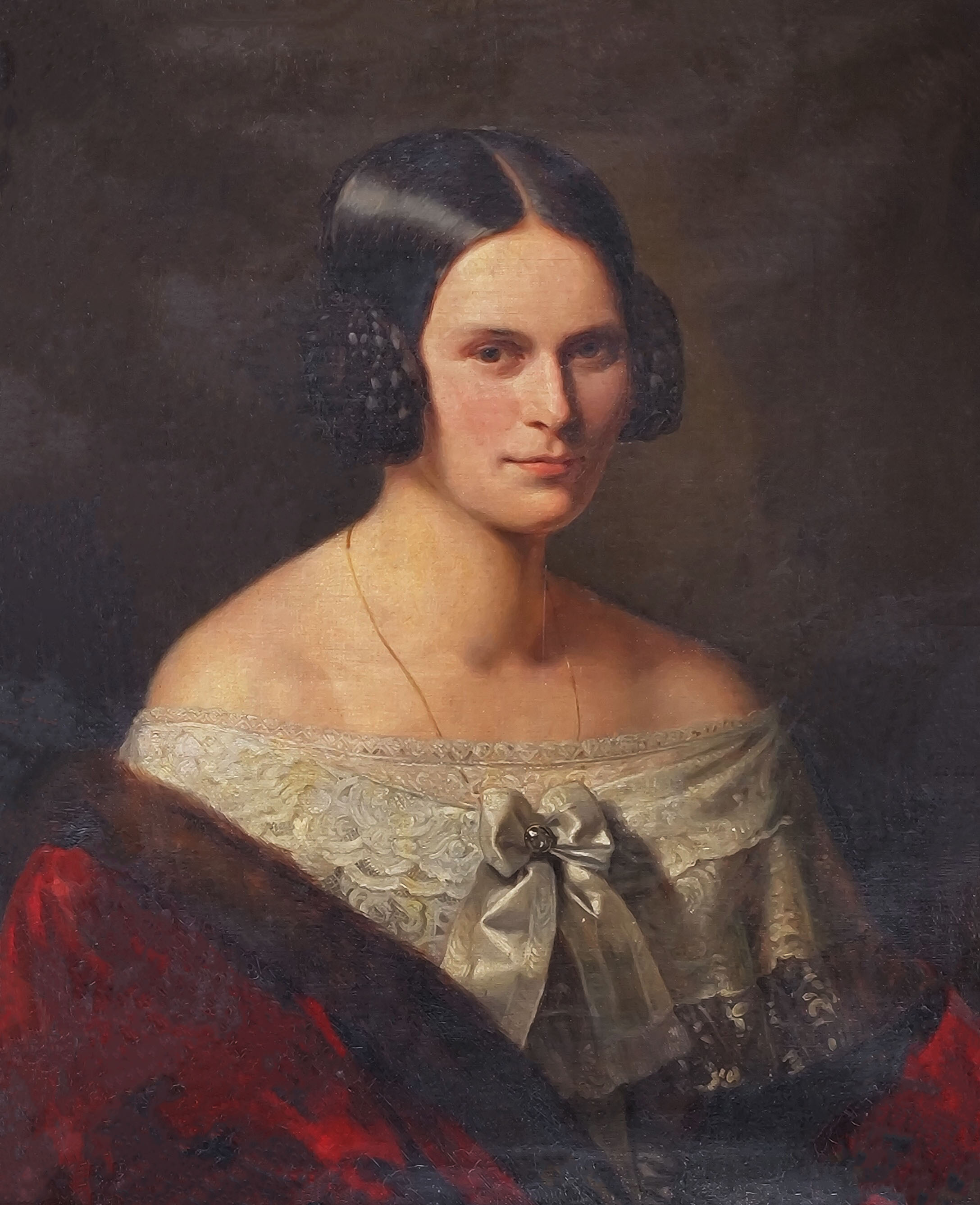
Portrait of his daughter-in-law, Countess Christina von Brühl, by Carl John, 1846

On 12 May 1811 Schönborn was married to Baroness Maria Anna von Kerpen (1784–1862), a daughter of Baron Wilhelm von Kerpen and Maria Antoinette von Hornstein-Göffingen. Her elder sister, Karolina Maria von Kerpen, was the wife of Ferdinand, 5th Prince Kinsky of Wchinitz and Tettau. Together, they were the parents of three sons, only one of whom lived to maturity:

- Erwein Damian Hugo Damian Hugo von Schönborn (1812–1881), who married Countess Christina Maria Josefa von Brühl, a daughter of Count Friedrich August von Brühl and granddaughter of Alois Friedrich von Brühl.
- Franz von Schönborn (1818–1818), who died young.
- Philipp Rudolf von Schönborn (1820–1830), who also died young.

The Count of Schönborn died on 24 March 1849.

=== Descendants ===
Through his son Erwein, he was a grandfather of Franziskus von Paula von Schönborn (1844–1899), the Bishop of České Budějovice and Archbishop of Prague who was created Cardinal in 1889.
