= Franz Philipp von Schönborn-Buchheim =

Franz Philipp von Schönborn
- Count of Schönborn-Buchheim
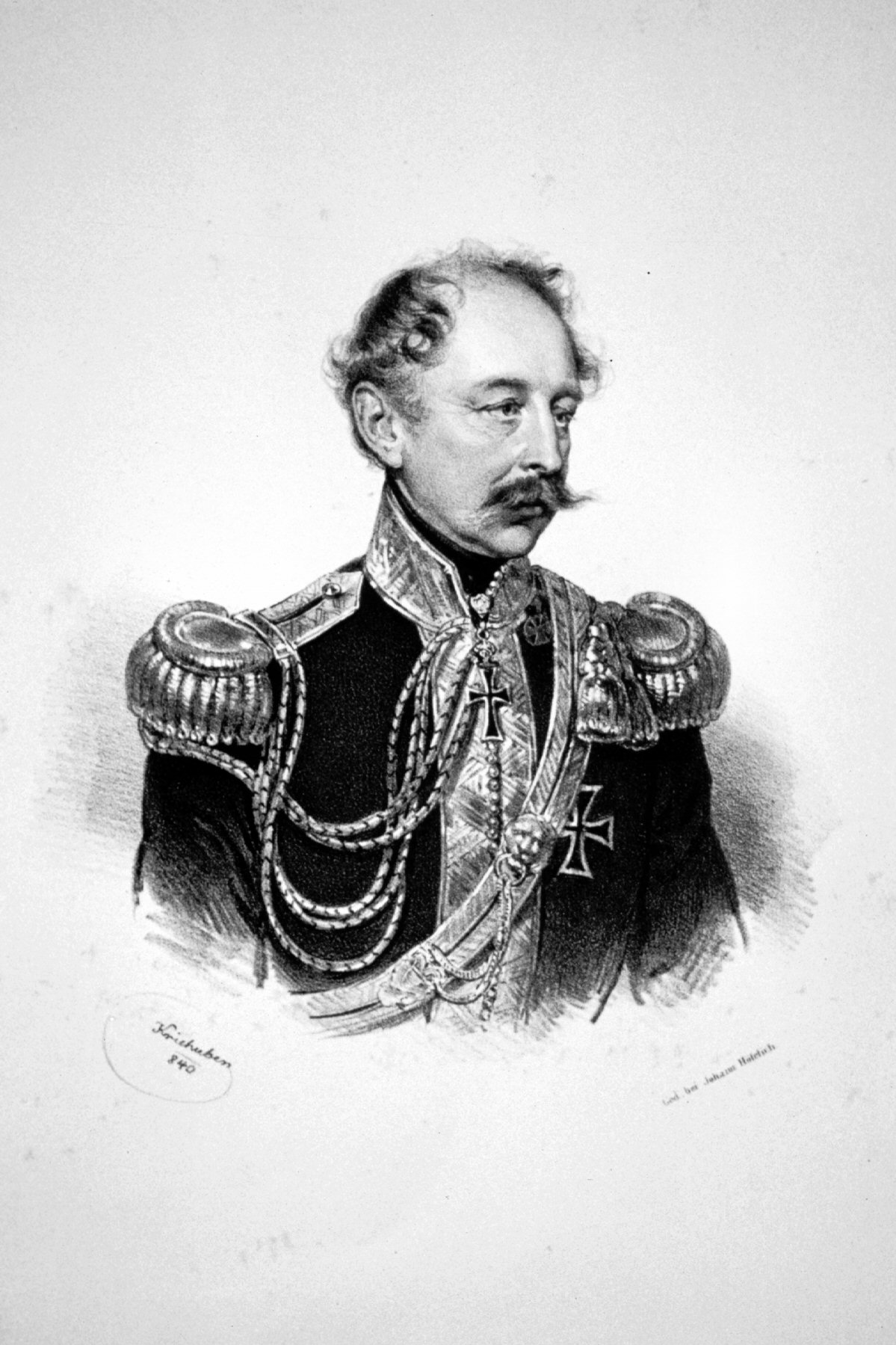
- Lithograph by Josef Kriehuber, 1840
- Born: Franz Philipp Joseph von Schönborn; 15 September 1768; Mainz, Electorate of Mainz
- Died: 18 August 1841 (aged 72); Vienna, Austrian Empire
- Spouse: Maria Sophie von der Leyen (m. 1789; died 1834)
- Issue: Erwein von Schönborn-Buchheim; Sophie von Schönborn-Buchheim; Karl von Schönborn-Buchheim
- House: Schönborn-Buchheim
- Father: Hugo Damian Erwein von Schönborn-Wiesentheid
- Mother: Maria Anna von Stadion zu Thannhausen und Warthausen

Franz Philipp Joseph, Graf von Schönborn-Buchheim (15 September 1768 – 18 August 1841), was an Imperial and Royal Lieutenant Colonel, Imperial and Royal Chamberlain.

== Early life ==
Franz Philipp Joseph was born on 15 September 1768 in Mainz in the Electorate of Mainz. He was the eldest surviving son of Count Hugo Damian Erwein von Schönborn-Wiesentheid and Countess Maria Anna von Stadion zu Thannhausen und Warthausen (1746–1817). Among his siblings were Sophie Theresia von Schönborn (who married Prince Philip Francis of Leyen), Franz Erwein von Schönborn-Wiesentheid (who married Countess Fernandine of Westphalia zu Fürstenberg, daughter of Count Clemens August von Westphalen), and Friedrich Karl Joseph von Schönborn (who married Baroness Maria Anna von Kerpen, daughter of Baron Wilhelm von Kerpen).

His paternal grandparents were Joseph Franz Bonaventura von Schönborn-Wiesentheid (only surviving son of Count Rudolf Franz Erwein von Schönborn) and Countess Bernhardine von Plettenberg.

== Career ==
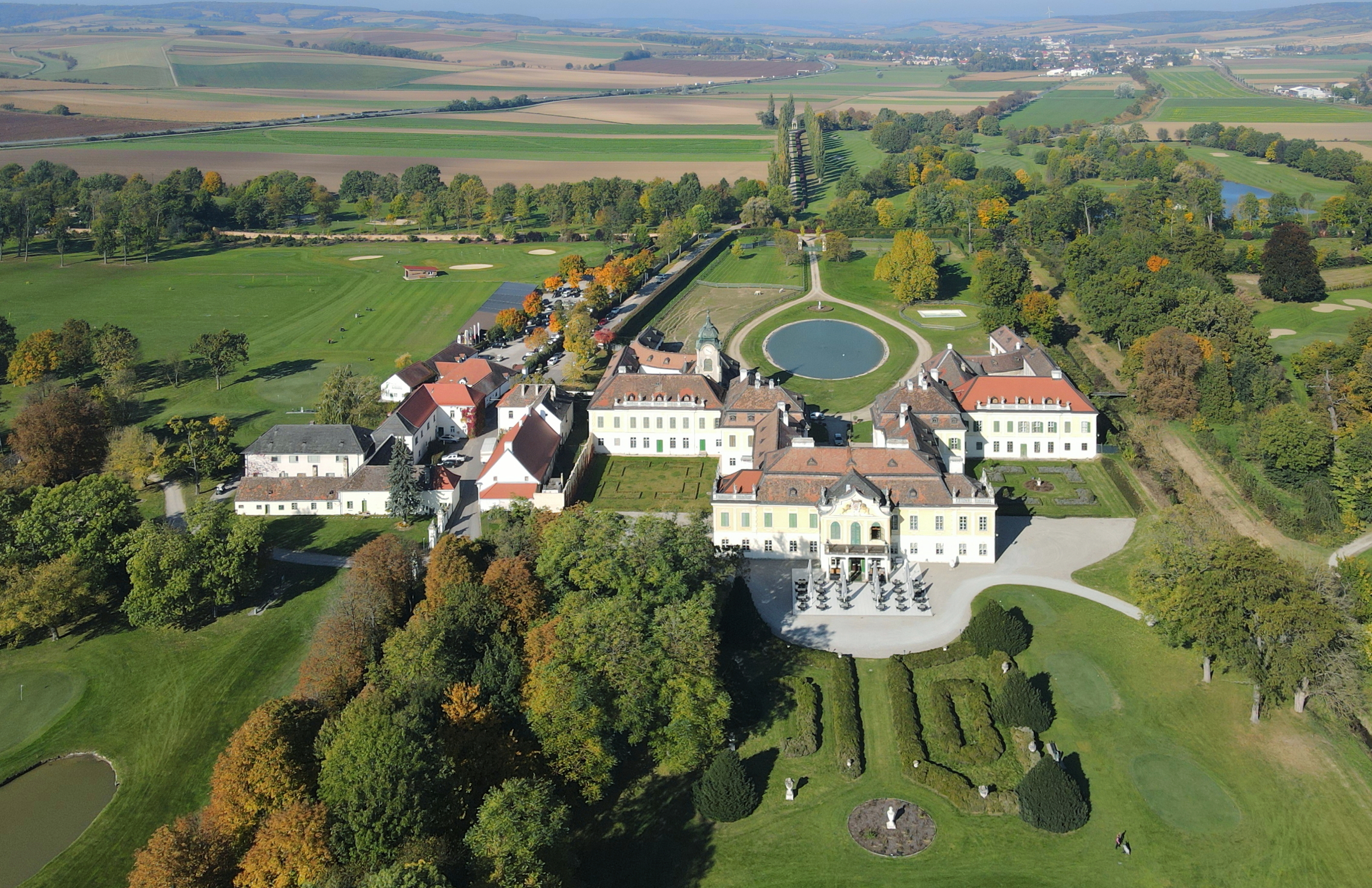
Schloss Schönborn

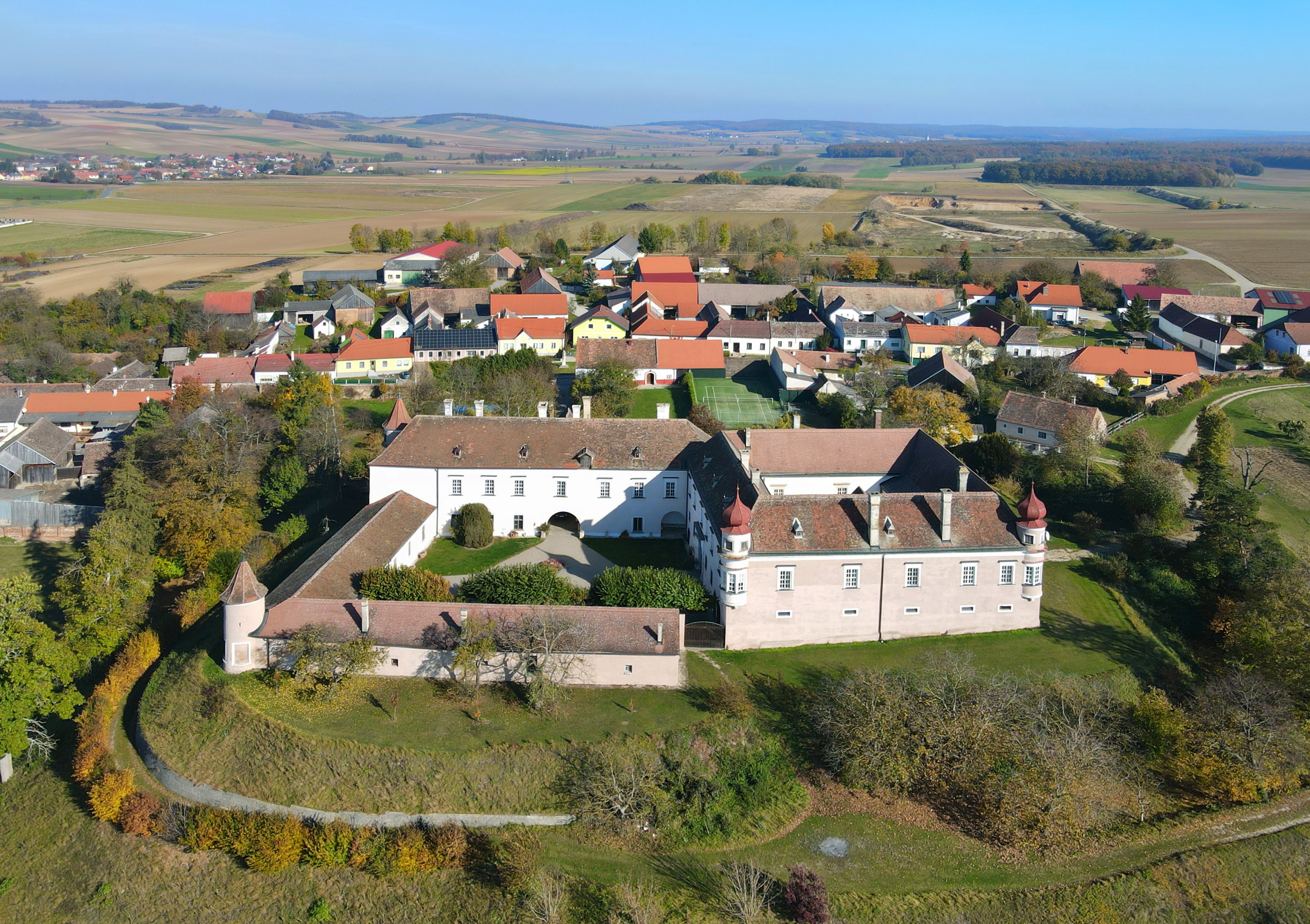
Weyerburg Castle and town

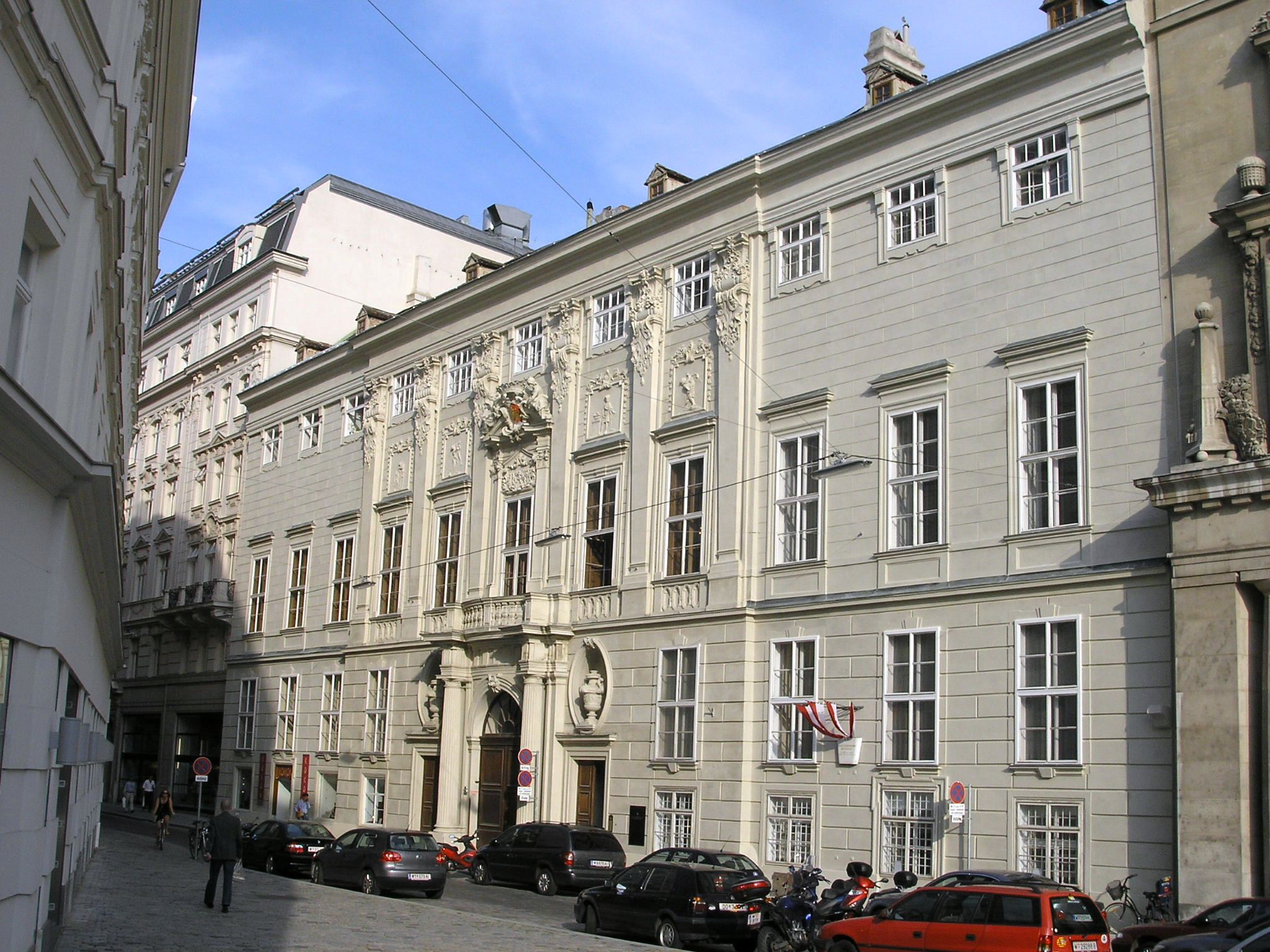
Palais Schönborn-Batthyány in Vienna

Schönborn was an Imperial and Royal Lieutenant Colonel, Imperial and Royal Chamberlain, and a Commander of the Teutonic Order.

As the eldest surviving son, Franz Philipp inherited the Göllersdorf estate (a Lower Austrian lordship acquired in 1710 from the last Count of Puchheim, the Bishop of Wiener Neustadt) and Weyerburg estates (another Lower Austrian lordship acquired in 1715) and Palais Schönborn-Batthyány in Vienna (which had been acquired in 1740 from the widow of Count Adam Batthyány). All were acquired by his great-grandfather's brother, Friedrich Karl von Schönborn, the Prince-Bishop of Würzburg and Bamberg who served as Vice-Chancellor of the Holy Roman Empire. Franz Philipp is considered the founder of the Austrian branch of the Schönborn family, which became known as von Schönborn-Buchheim.

Since Franz Philipp inherited a number of the older family estates, his father named his younger brother, Franz Erwein, as his successor, who is considered the founder of the Franconian branch, Schönborn-Wiesentheid.

== Personal life ==
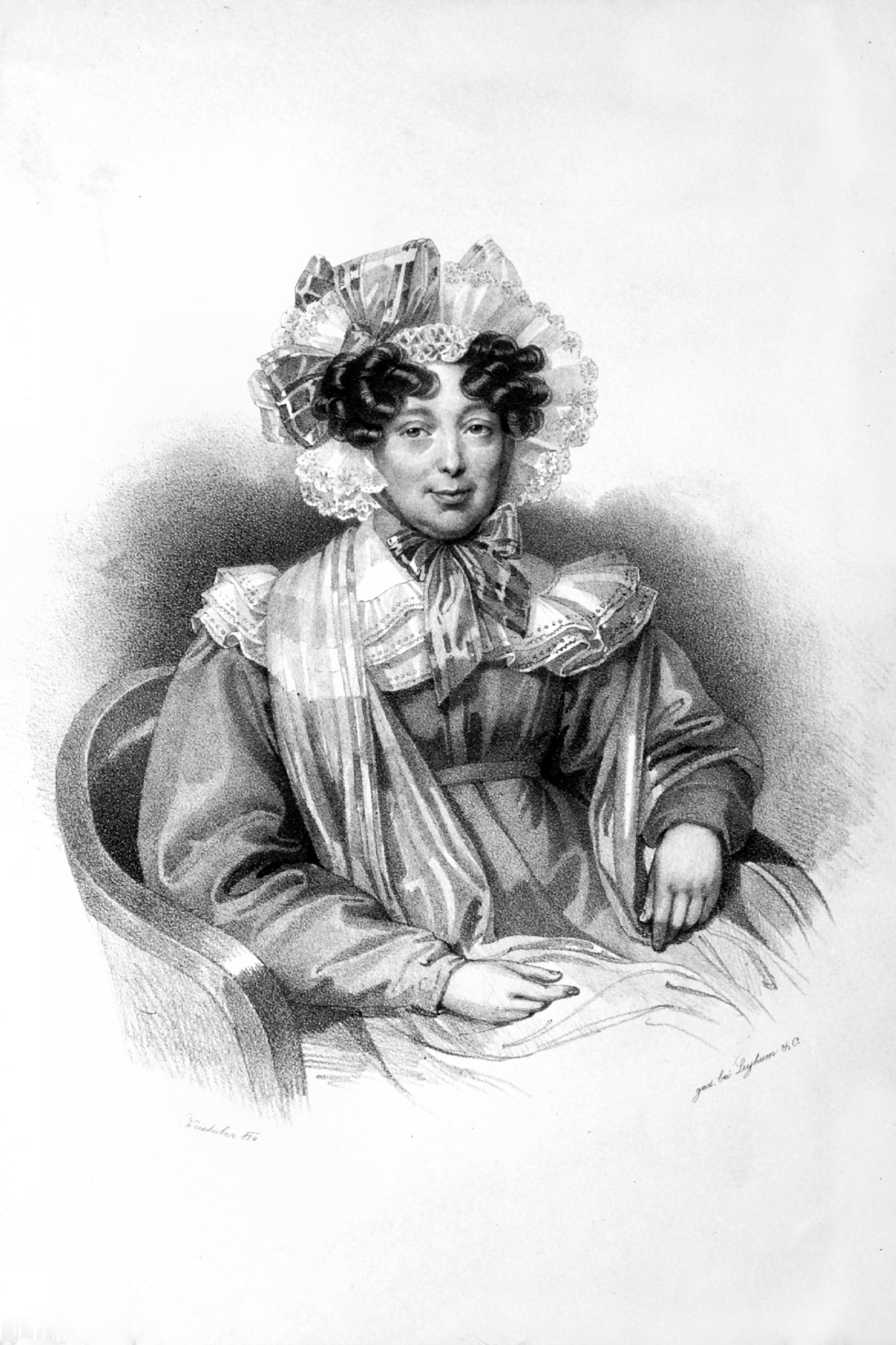
Lithograph of his daughter, Princess Sophie Therese von der Leyen (née Schönborn-Buchheim), by Josef Kriehuber, 1843

On 20 October 1789 at Blieskastel, Franz Philipp was married to Countess Maria Sophie von der Leyen (1769–1834), a daughter of Prince Franz Karl von der Leyen und zu Hohengeroldseck and Baroness Maria Anna Helene Josepha Kämmerer von Worms von Dalberg. Together, they were the parents of:

- Erwein Damian Hugo von Schönborn-Buchheim (1791–1864), who married Countess Ernestine von Küenburg, a daughter of Count Ernst von Küenburg and Maria Anna Chorinský, in 1824.
- Sophie Therese Johanna von Schönborn-Buchheim (1798–1876), who married her double first cousin, Prince Erwein von der Leyen, son of Prince Philip Francis of Leyen, in 1818.
- Karl Friedrich Eduard von Schönborn-Buchheim (1803–1854), who married Countess Maria Anna von Bolza at Szarvas in 1833.

Franz Philipp died on 18 August 1841 in Vienna in the Austrian Empire. He was succeeded in his title by his eldest son, Erwein, who resigned his rights to his brother, Karl, in 1844.

=== Descendants ===
Through his daughter Sophie, he was a grandfather of Philipp Franz Erwein Theodor, 3rd Prince of Leyen-Hohengeroldseck (1819–1882), who married Princess Adelheid Karoline von Thurn und Taxis (a direct descendant of Alexander Ferdinand, 3rd Prince of Thurn and Taxis).

Through his son Karl, he was a grandfather of Erwein von Schönborn-Buchheim (1842–1903), who married Franziska von und zu Trauttmansdorff-Weinsberg (a direct descendant of Prince Ferdinand von Trauttmansdorff) in 1864.
