= Schönborn Palace (Prague) =

Current home of the U.S. Embassy to the Czech Republic

Coordinates: 50°5′13.47″N 14°24′4.08″E

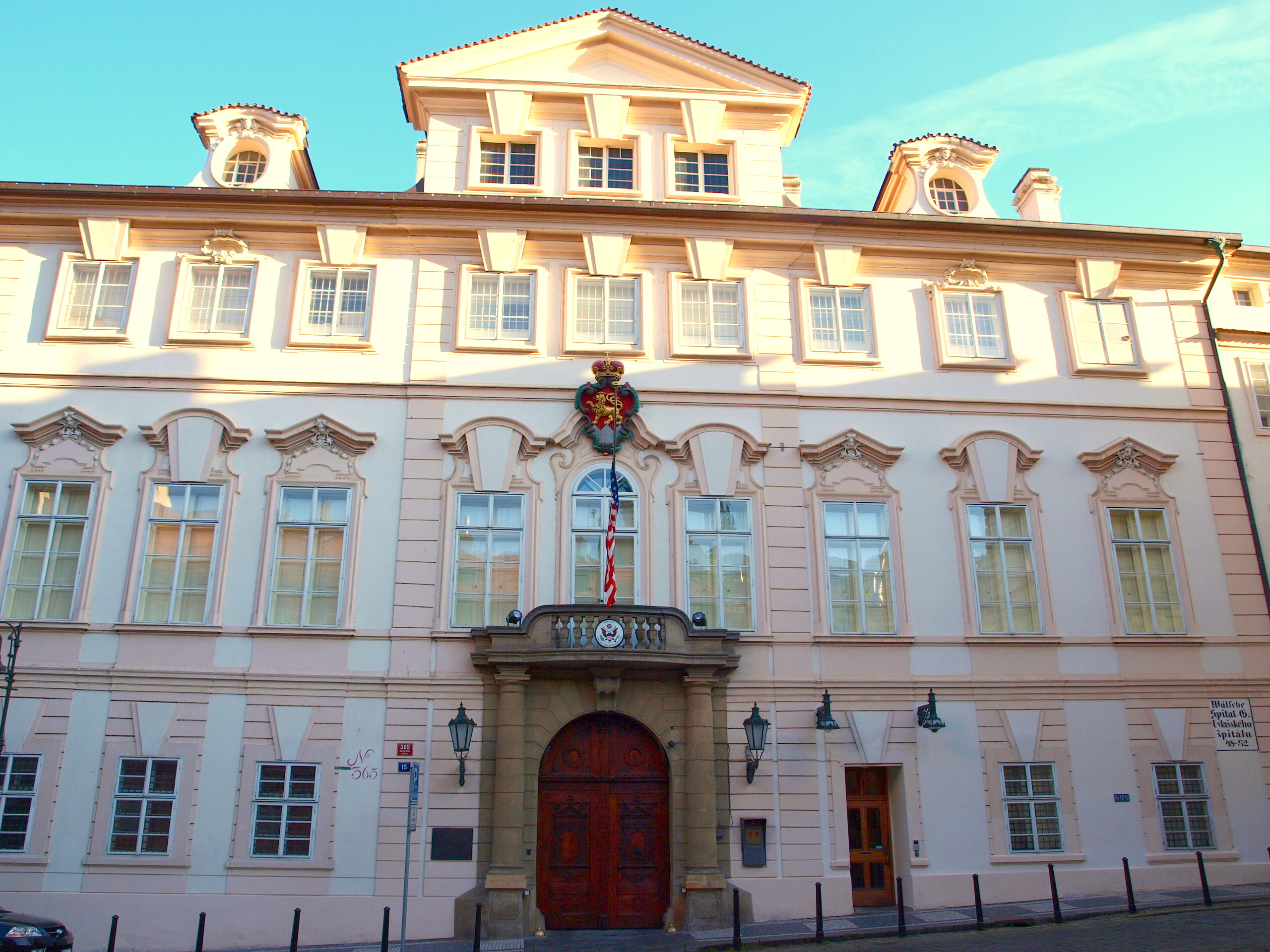
Schönborn Palace in 2012

The Schönborn Palace (Czech: Schönbornský palác) in the Malá Strana district of Prague is the current home of the United States Embassy to the Czech Republic. The first United States Minister to Czechoslovakia was Richard Crane, the grandson of a Chicago plumbing millionaire. Crane, who had acquired the palace at the end of the First World War, sold the building in 1925 to the United States Government for $117,000.

== History ==
Rudolf von Colloredo built the present palace between 1643 and 1656 on the site of an earlier building that had been destroyed during the Thirty Years War. Having lost a leg at the Battle of Lutzen, the count had the flight of steps leading to the first garden terrace built with a special incline to enable him to ride into his palace on horseback.

The palace was ultimately inherited by the Schönborn family, from whom it took its present name. Writer Franz Kafka lived and worked in the palace in 1917. The last inhabitant was Count Carl Johann Schönborn (1890–1952), grand nephew of Cardinal Franziskus Schönborn of Prague and grandfather of Cardinal Christoph Schönborn of Vienna, who sold the property in 1919, after World War I, to Richard Teller Crane II, who served as US ambassador from 1919 until 1921 and sold it to the United States Government in 1924.

American diplomat George F. Kennan, in his memoir, wrote that when he arrived in Prague in 1938 there were beautiful terraced gardens behind the palace. The garden had an orchard, which contained a structure called the Glorietta. From that location there was a view of the Charles Bridge in one direction and of the Hradčany Castle in another.

== Gallery ==
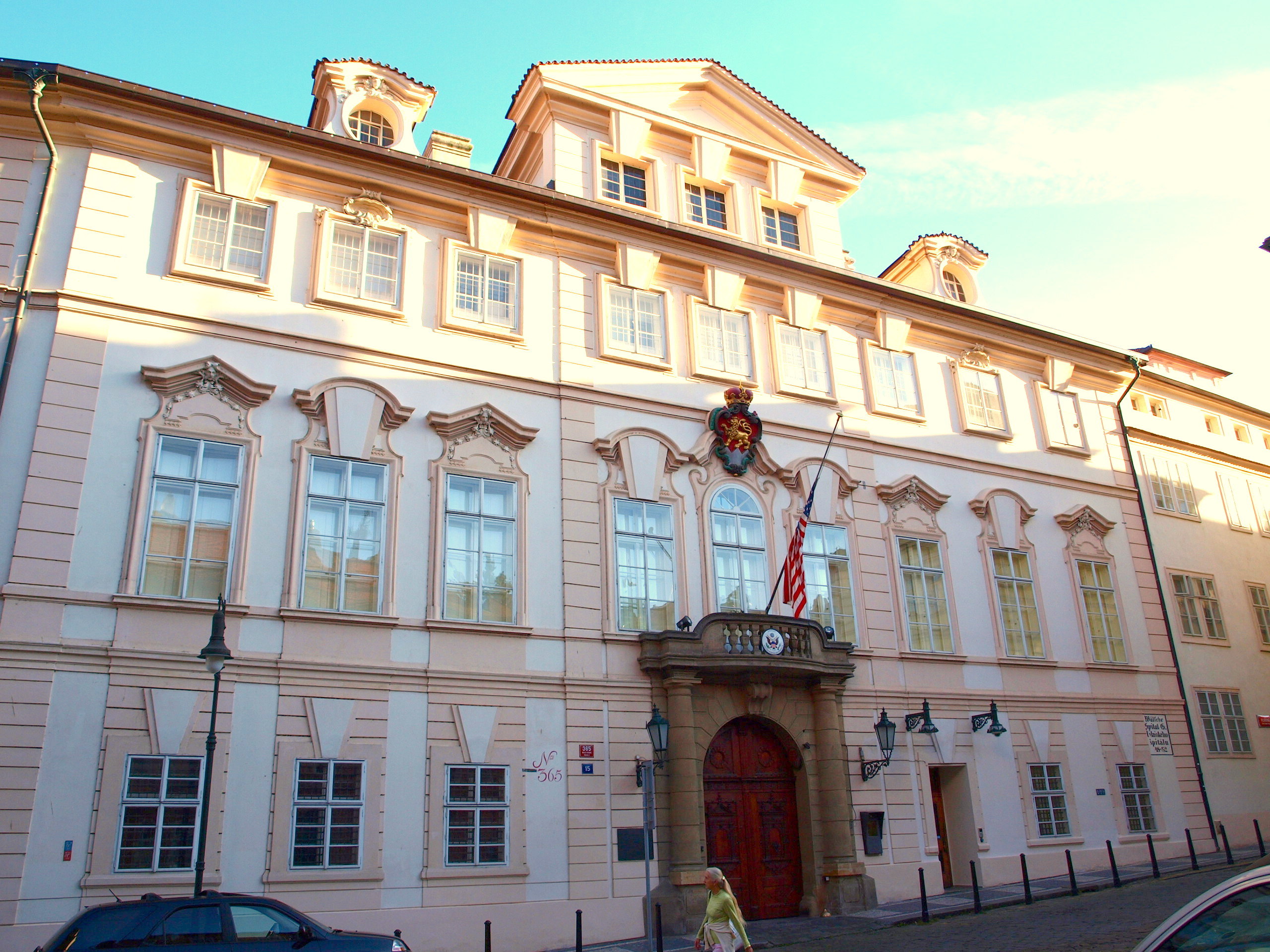
The palace in 2012

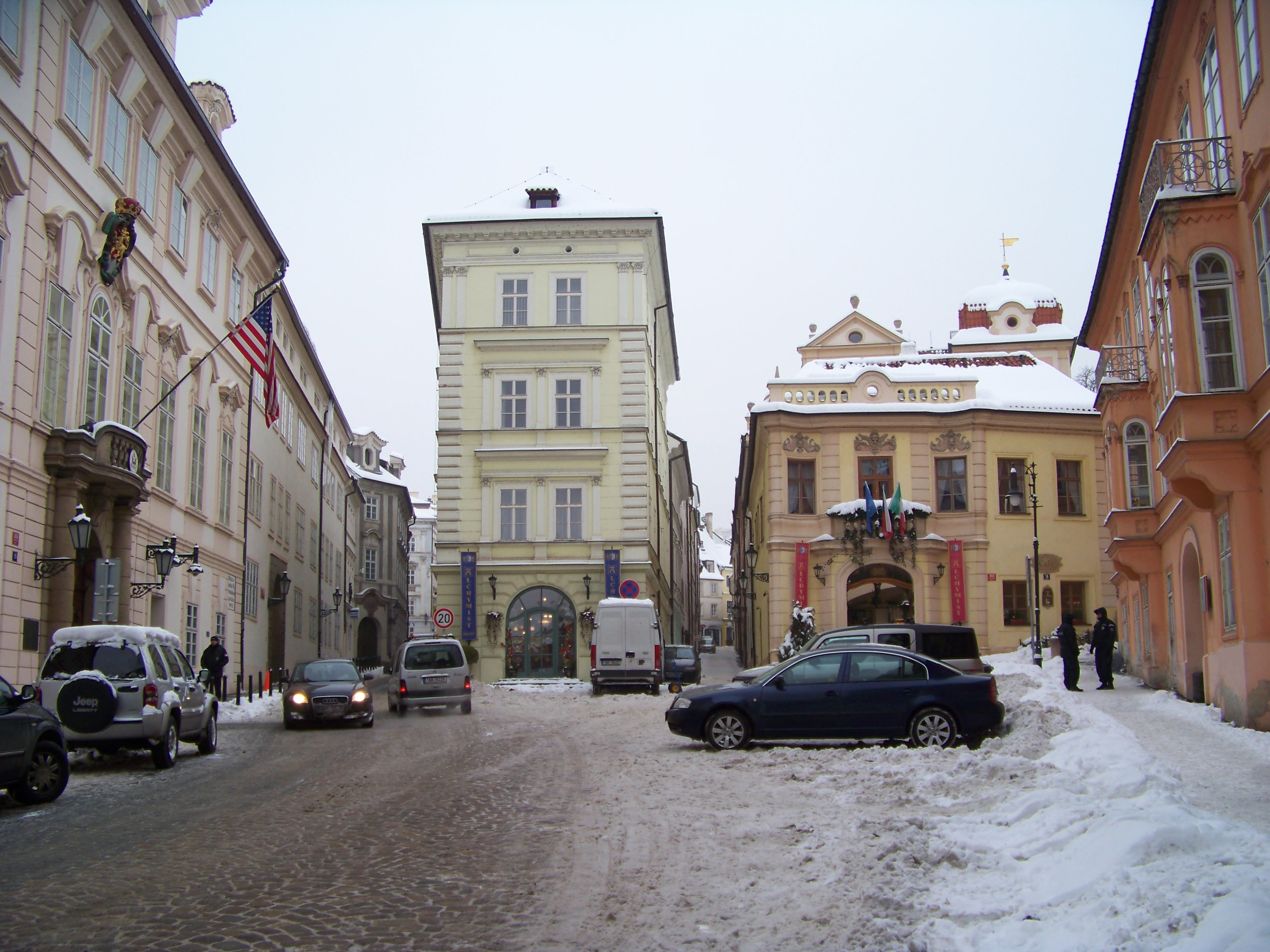
The palace in winter

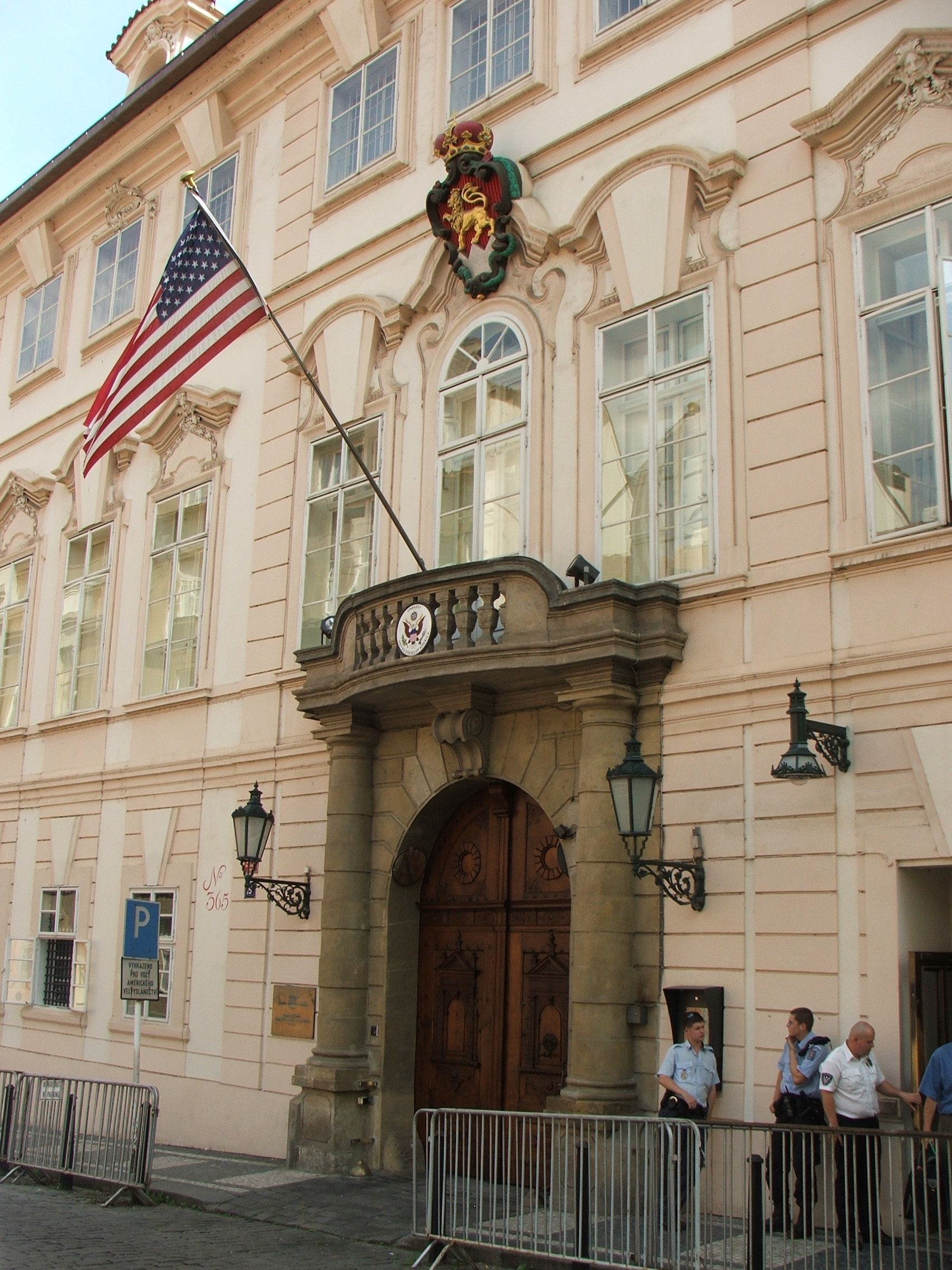
The front entrance

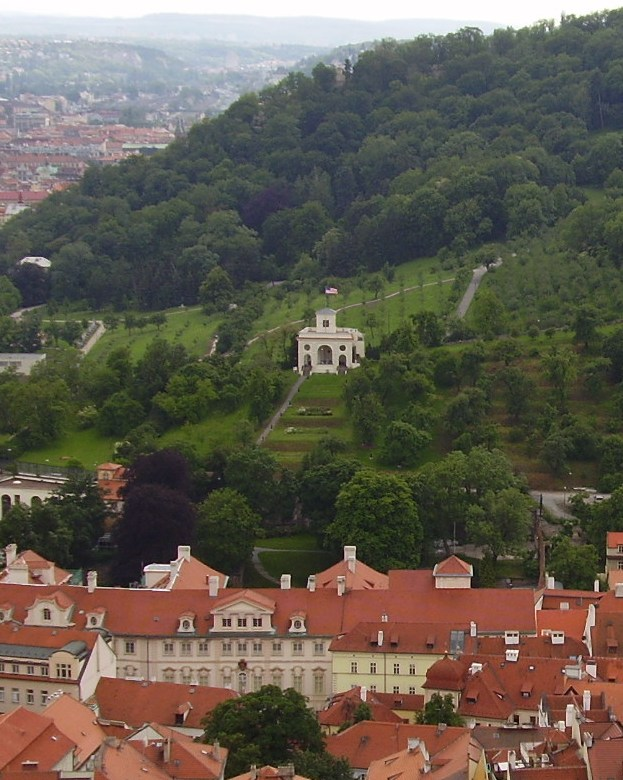
The garden is visible on the Petrin Hill

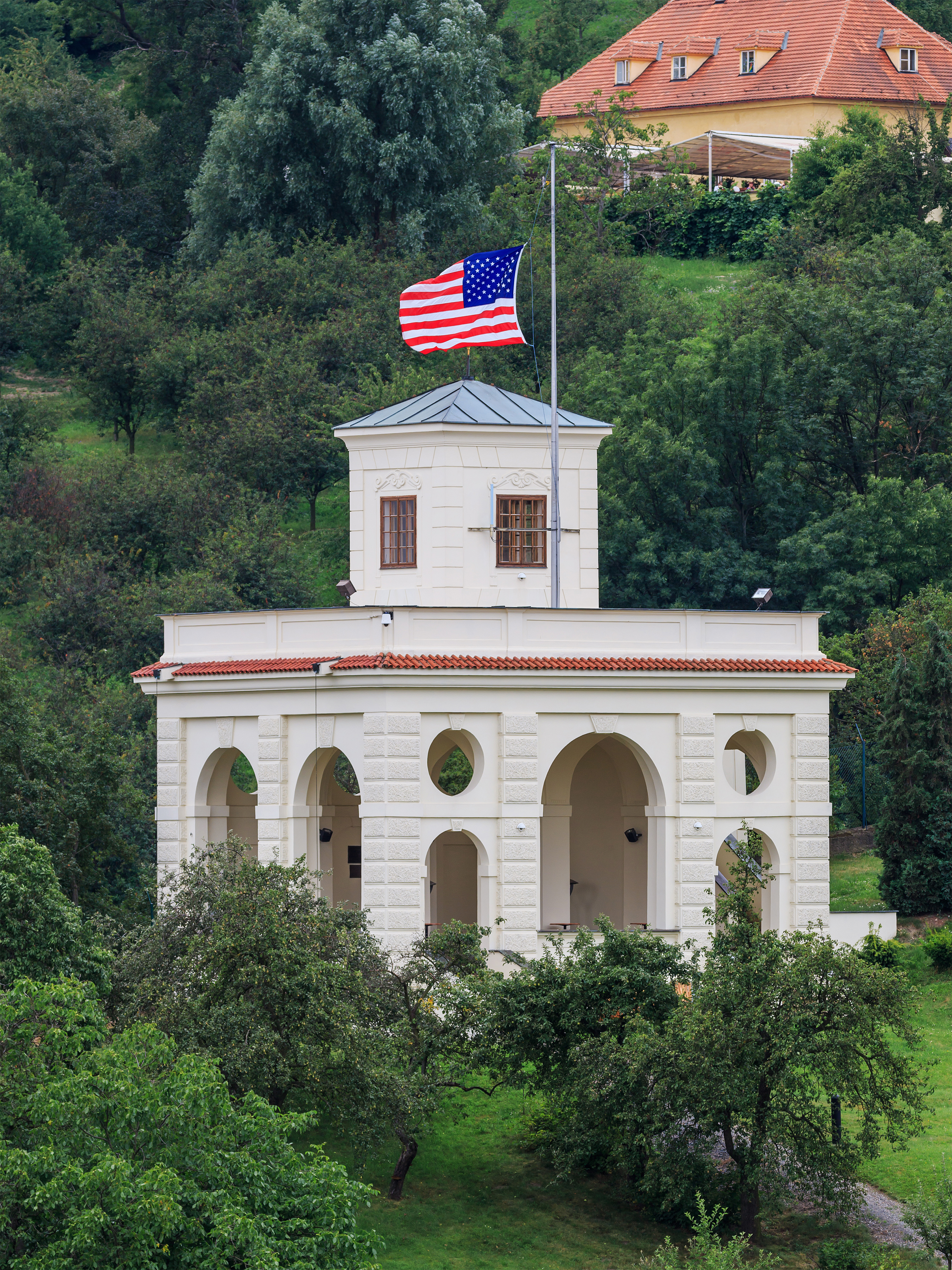
Glorietta
