= Eleonore Schönborn =

Austrian politician (1920–2022)

- Photo of young Eleonore Schönborn, c. 1950
- Born: Eleonore Freiin von Doblhoff; 14 April 1920; Brno, Czechoslovakia
- Died: 25 February 2022 (aged 101); Schruns, Austria
- Spouse: Hugo-Damian Schönborn (m. 1942; div. 1958)
- Children: 4, including Christoph and Michael
- Parent(s): Baron Herbert Viktor Rudolf von Doblhoff; Gertrud von Skutezky
- Family: Doblhoff (by birth); Schönborn (by marriage)
- Awards: Order of Merit of Vorarlberg; Decoration of Honour for Services to the Republic of Austria

Eleonore Schönborn (née Freiin von Doblhoff; 14 April 1920 – 25 February 2022) was an Austrian politician and member of the House of Schönborn. Being ethnic Germans, she and her family were expelled from Czechoslovakia in 1945, settling in Austria. She became the first woman to hold a procuriate in Vorarlberg, and to be elected to the Schruns municipal council.

She was director of the Montafoner Heimatmuseum, and co-founded an association for care of senior citizens at their homes. Schönborn had four children, including Cardinal Christoph Schönborn and the actor Michael Schönborn. She received awards for her work for cultural and social improvements in the region, including the Decoration of Honour for Services to the Republic of Austria.

== Life and career ==
Coat of Arms of the Barons von Doblhoff-Dier (1772)

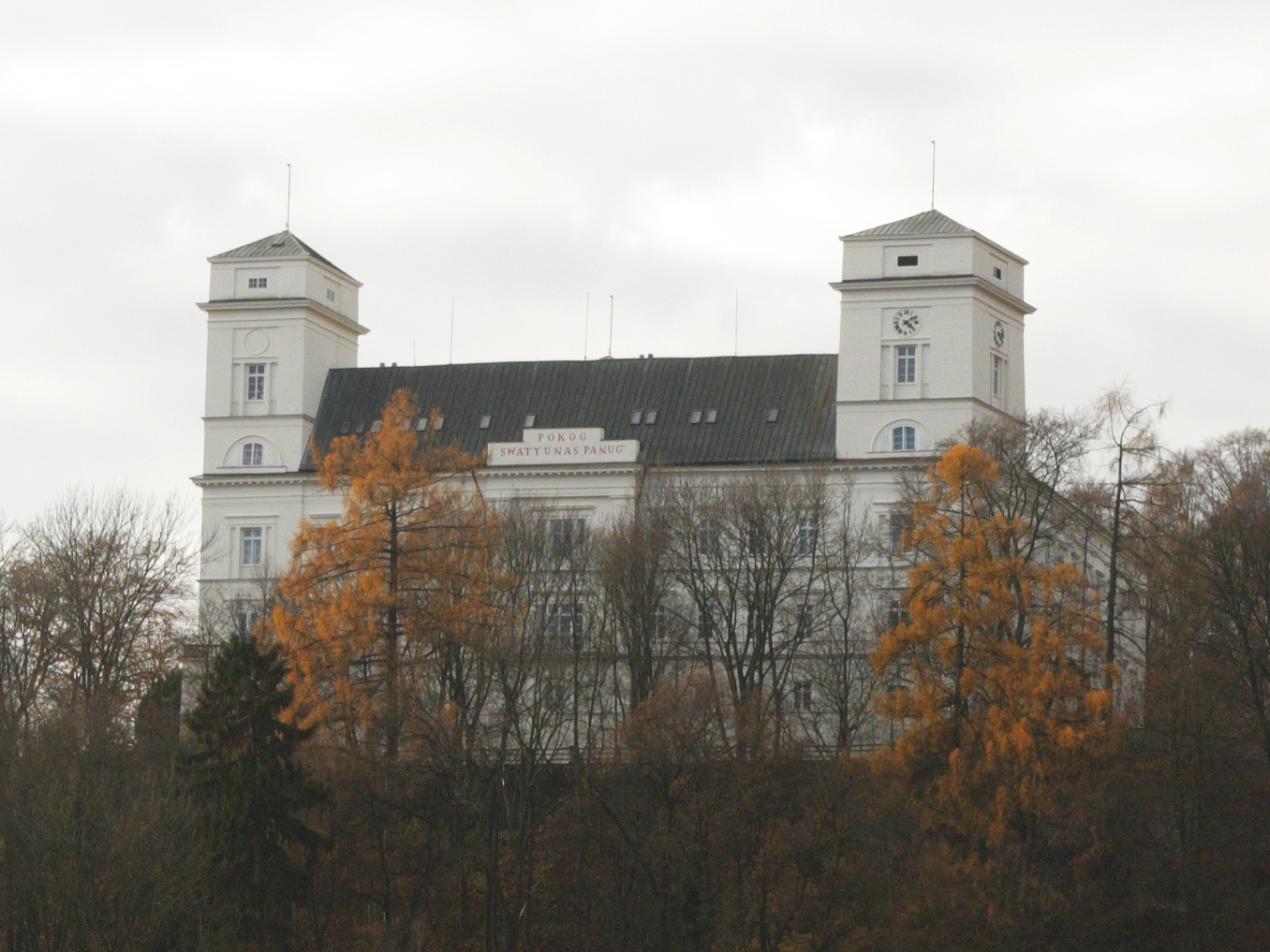
Račice Castle in South Moravia where Eleonore spent her childhood

Skalka Castle, country residence of the Schönborn family in Vlastislav

Eleonore Schönborn (2015)

Eleonore Ottilie Hilda Maria Freiin von Doblhoff was born in Brno, Czechoslovakia, as the youngest daughter of Herbert Viktor Rudolf, Freiherr von Doblhoff (1887–1932) and his wife, Gertrud von Skutezky (1891–1945), younger daughter of Dr. Hubert Ritter von Skutetzky, a prominent industrialist, member of parliament (Landtagsabgeordneter) in the Mährisch-ständische Landtag, physician, landowner, and prolific collector of historical memorabilia. By birth, she was a member of the Doblhoff family, an old, prominent Austrian aristocratic family originating in Styria, whose noble ancestry dates back to the late 16th century.

Eleonore grew up with her siblings in Račice (Ratschitz) at the castle owned by her father, where she also attended a boarding school. Her father died of multiple sclerosis while she was still a young woman.

In April 1942, she met the painter Hugo-Damian Schönborn (1916–1979), a member of the House of Schönborn. They married in Prague, Protectorate of Bohemia and Moravia, on 10 May that year and took up residence in Skalka Castle in Vlastislav. Her husband was a soldier who sympathized with the resistance to the Nazis. He was convinced that Hitler was a criminal, wanted to do as little as possible for the war, and stubbornly refused to become an officer in the Wehrmacht, which would have been his position. In October 1944, he deserted in Belgium to the British forces.

In September 1945, Schönborn was expelled from Czechoslovakia and fled with her two small children Philipp and Christoph. She found shelter first with relatives in Breiteneich in Lower Austria. From 1946, she lived with her sister in Graz, where she was later reunited with her husband. They had two more children, Barbara and Michael. The family moved to Schruns in 1950, where she found work.

In 1958, the couple divorced. (Note: Munzinger: 1959.) She made a living working at the Getzner Textil company in Bludenz, where she worked for 30 years. Due to her language proficiency, she was promoted to chief secretary, procurist and press speaker, the first woman in such positions in Vorarlberg. She had a house built for her family, and was active in the council of the church parish.

Schönborn was the first woman elected to the Schruns municipal council, serving from 1975 to 1985, initiating the erection of museums in Montafon. From 1979 to 2000, she was museum director of the Montafoner Heimatmuseum Schruns. She founded, together with nurse and nun Bernardis Hinrichs, an association for medical assistance and care at home (Krankenpflegeverein Außermontafon).

In 2008, she was made an honorary member. She was awarded the Order of Merit of Vorarlberg in 1997, and in Gold in 2013, and received the Decoration of Honour for Services to the Republic of Austria in 2013.

She recounted in interviews and her memoir her memories of her expulsion, the life of her son Christoph, who became Cardinal and Archbishop of Vienna, and social topics in general. Schönborn opposed the deportation of refugee families. She was a committed European and also a passionate card player.

Due to restrictions during the COVID-19 pandemic, she was unable to celebrate her centenary with her family.

== Death ==
With limited ability to move, and almost completely blind, Schönborn died in Schruns on 25 February 2022, aged 101.
