= Hugo Damian Erwein von Schönborn-Wiesentheid =

- Count of Schönborn-Wiesentheid
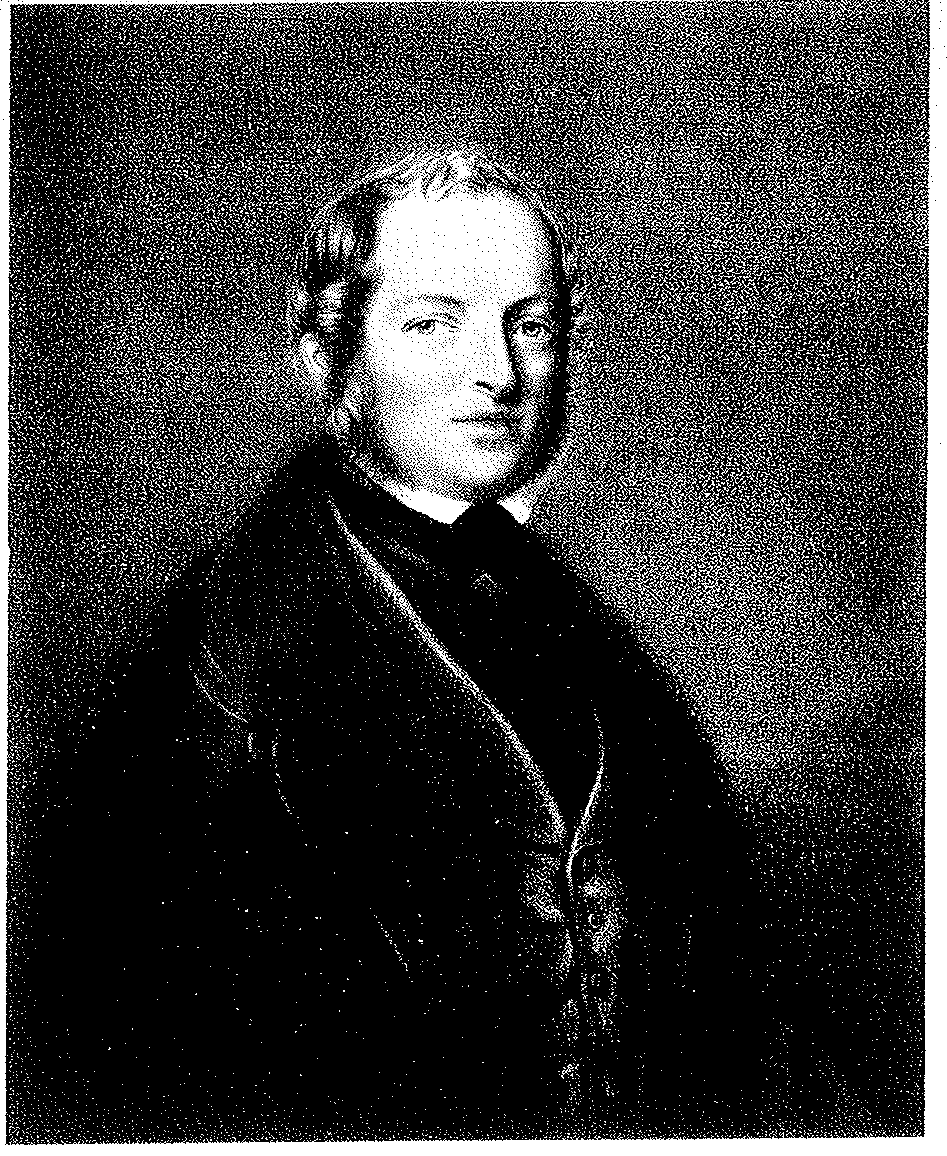
- Born: Hugo Damian Friedrich Karl Franz Erwein von Schönborn-Wiesentheid; 27 October 1738; Aschaffenburg, Electorate of Mainz
- Died: 29 March 1817 (aged 78); Vienna, Austrian Empire
- Spouse: Maria Anna von Stadion zu Thannhausen-Warthausen (m. 1763; died 1817)
- Issue: Franz Philipp von Schönborn-Buchheim; Sophie Theresia von Schönborn; Franz Erwein von Schönborn-Wiesentheid; Friedrich Karl Joseph von Schönborn
- House: Schönborn-Wiesentheid
- Father: Joseph Franz Bonaventura von Schönborn-Wiesentheid
- Mother: Bernhardine von Plettenberg

Hugo Damian Friedrich Karl Franz Erwein von Schönborn-Wiesentheid (27 October 1738 – 29 March 1817), was a German chamberlain and member of the counsel from Aschaffenburg. He was Count of Wiesentheid from 1772 to 1806. After the dissolution of the county he withdrew to his estates in Vienna.

== Early life ==
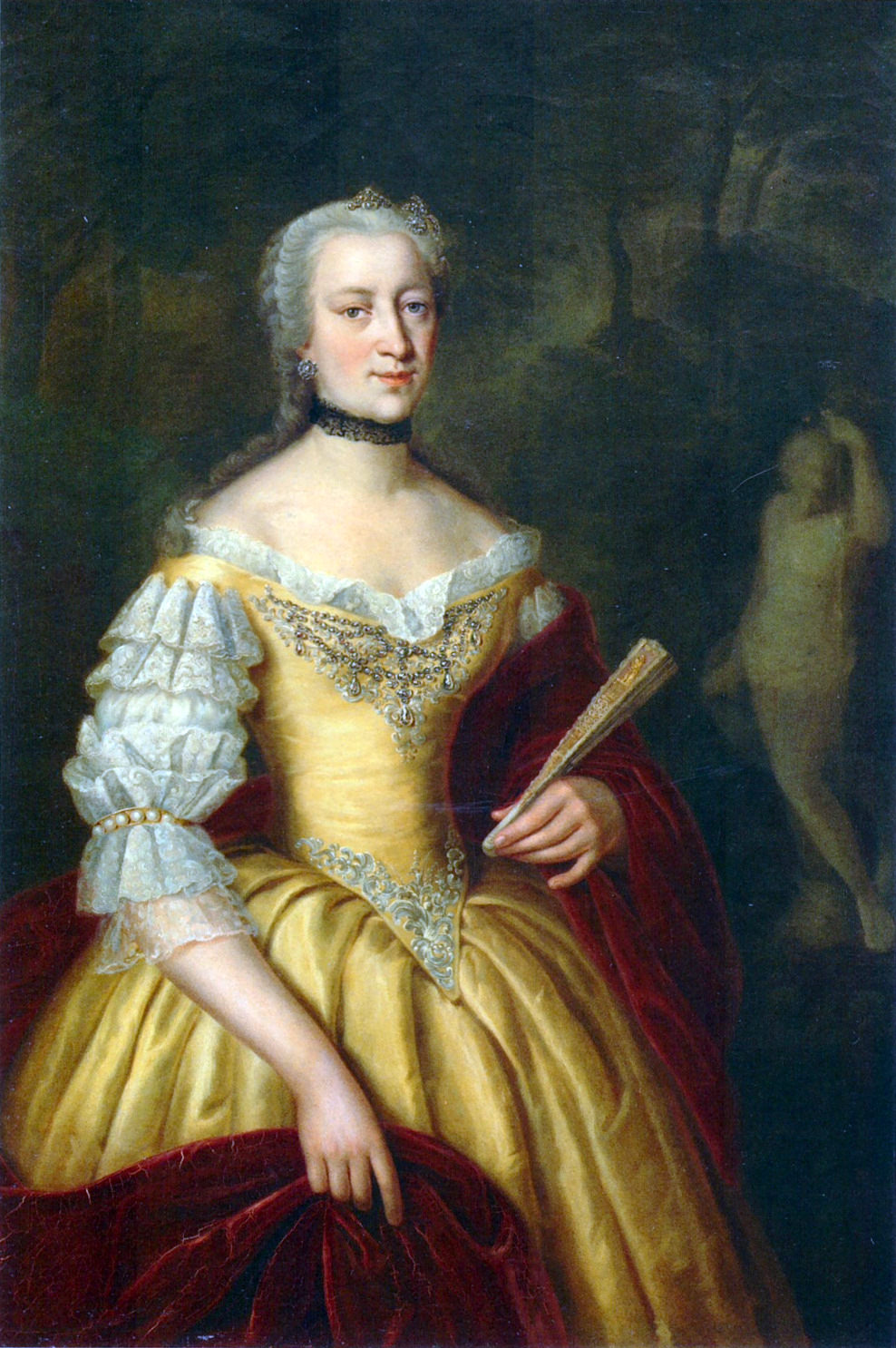
Portrait of his mother, Countess Bernhardine von Plettenberg, c. 1740

Schönborn was born on 27 October 1738 in Aschaffenburg, Electorate of Mainz. He was the eldest son of Joseph Franz Bonaventura von Schönborn-Wiesentheid (1708–1772), and Countess Bernhardine von Plettenberg. With the exception of his sister Bernhardina, all of his siblings died before reaching adulthood. She married Dominik, Prince of Kaunitz-Rietberg, son of Wenzel Anton, Prince of Kaunitz-Rietberg.

His paternal grandparents were Count Rudolf Franz Erwein von Schönborn and Countess Maria Eleonore von Dernbach (née Countess von Hatzfeld-Wildenburg). His maternal grandparents were Count Ferdinand von Plettenberg-Wittem and Bernhardine Felizitas von Westerholt-Lembeck.

== Career ==
After his father's death in 1772, Hugo Damian Erwein took over the rule of Wiesentheid. Before that, in 1763, he had married Countess von Stadion zu Warthausen und Tannhausen. The count established several foundations within the county. A poor fund can be traced back to the count, and road construction in the Franconian possessions also experienced a decisive upturn under Hugo Damian Erwein. In 1774, an agreement was made with the Bishopric of Würzburg. In 1794, he was named heir by his relative, Prince Friedrich Cajetan von Hatzfeld.

In addition to his duties in the county, Hugo Damian Erwein also took on other offices. He was Imperial and Royal Chamberlain in the Austrian hereditary lands. He was also Imperial Privy Councillor and Knight of the Imperial Order of St. Joseph. In 1804 he was appointed regimental castle guard of Friedberg and knight of honor of the Order of Malta. On 6 August 1806, the Holy Roman Empire was dissolved during the Napoleonic Wars. On September 18 of the same year, Bavarian troops occupied the county. Hugo Damian Erwein then withdrew to his property in Austria.

== Personal life ==
On 27 January 1763, Schönborn was married to Countess Maria Anna von Stadion zu Thannhausen und Warthausen (1746–1817) in the Christophkirche in Mainz. Together, they were the parents of eight children, of whom only four reached adulthood:

- Bernhardine Maria Anna von Schönborn (1764–1765), who died young.
- Emmerich Friedrich Franz Philipp von Schönborn (1767–1772), who died young.
- Franz Philipp Joseph von Schönborn-Buchheim (1768–1841), who married Countess Maria Sophie von der Leyen, a daughter of Prince Franz Karl von der Leyen, in 1789.
- Maria Johanna von Schönborn (1769–1770), who died young.
- Bernhard Joseph von Schönborn (1771–1773), who died young.
- Sophie Theresia von Schönborn (1772–1810), who married Prince Philip Francis, Prince of Leyen, a son of Prince Franz Karl von der Leyen, in 1788.
- Franz Erwein von Schönborn-Wiesentheid (1776–1840), who married Countess Fernandine of Westphalia zu Fürstenberg, daughter of Count Clemens August von Westphalen zu Fürstenberg (sole heir of his maternal great-uncle, Prince-Bishop of Paderborn William Anton of Asseburg, and his paternal uncle, Prince-Bishop of Hildesheim Friedrich Wilhelm of Westphalia), in 1802.
- Friedrich Karl Joseph von Schönborn (1781–1849), who married Baroness Maria Anna von Kerpen, daughter of Baron Wilhelm von Kerpen, in 1811.

He died in Vienna on 29 March 1817. His eldest surviving son, Franz Philipp, founded the Austrian branch, Schönborn-Buchheim; he second surviving son, Franz Erwein, was chosen as his successor and founded the Franconian branch, Schönborn-Wiesentheid; and his youngest son, Friedrich Karl, founded the Bohemian branch, Schönborn.
