= Kerpen (disambiguation) =

Kerpen is a town in North Rhine-Westphalia.

Kerpen may also refer to:

- Kerpen (surname)
- Kerpen, Rhineland-Palatinate, village in Rhineland-Palatinate
- Kierpień, in Upper Silesia
