= Franziskus von Paula Graf von Schönborn =

Czech cardinal

His Eminence Franziskus von Paula Graf von Schönborn
- Archbishop of Prague
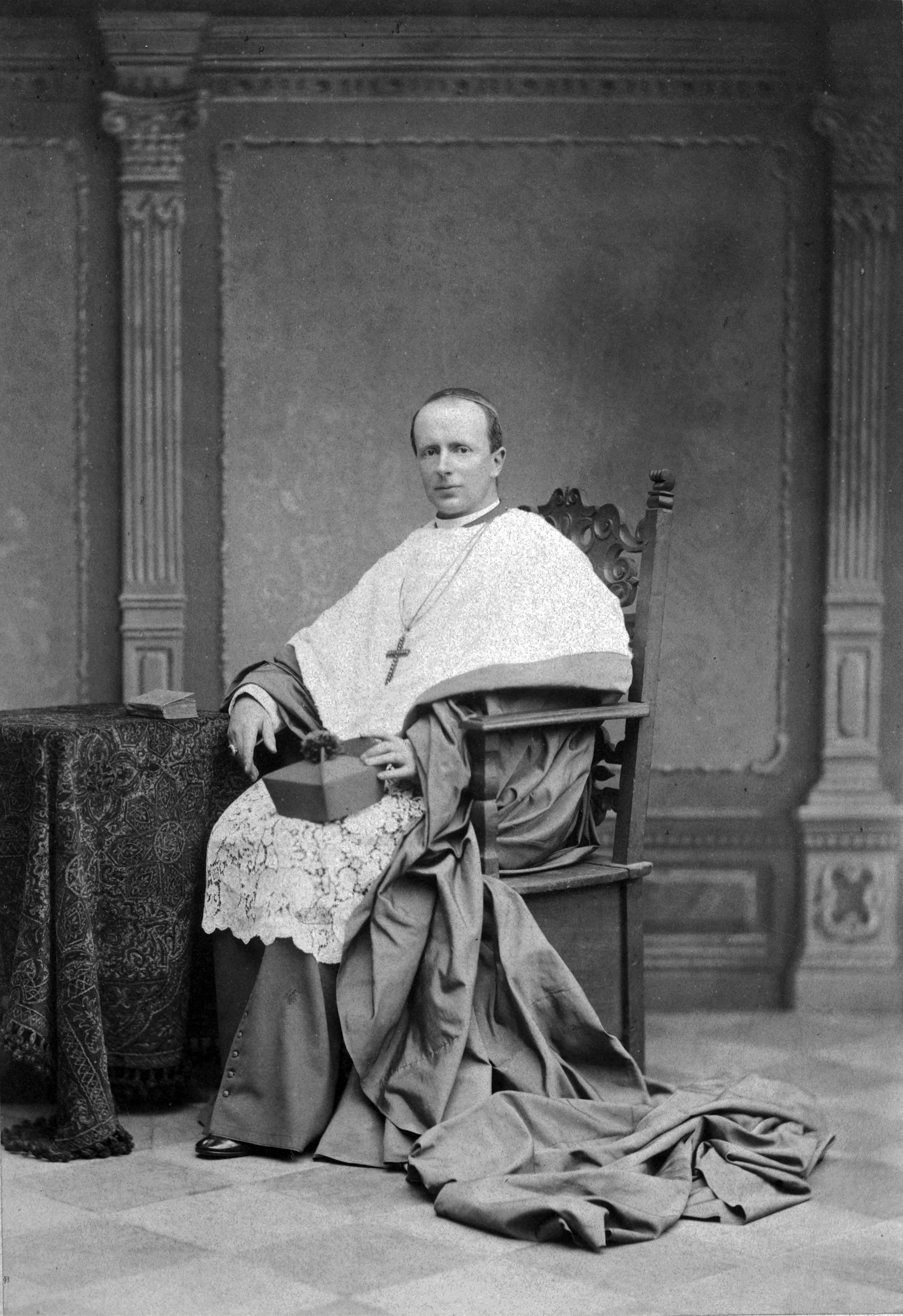
- Church: Catholic Church
- Archdiocese: Prague
- See: Prague
- Appointed: 27 July 1885
- Term ended: 25 June 1899
- Predecessor: Friedrich Johannes Jacob Celestin von Schwarzenberg
- Successor: Lev Skrbenský z Hříště
- Other post: Cardinal-Priest of Santi Giovanni e Paolo (1889–1899)
- Previous post: Bishop of České Budějovice (1883–85)

Orders
- Ordination: 12 August 1873
- Consecration: 18 November 1883 by Friedrich Johannes Jacob Celestin von Schwarzenberg
- Created cardinal: 24 May 1889 by Pope Leo XIII
- Rank: Cardinal-Priest

Personal details
- Born: 24 January 1844 Prague, Austrian Empire
- Died: 25 June 1899 (aged 55) Falkenau an der Eger, Austria-Hungary
- Buried: Saint Vitus Cathedral
- Parents: Erwein, 2nd Count of Schönborn; Christina Maria Josefa von Brühl
- Education: University of Prague; University of Innsbruck; Pontifical Gregorian University
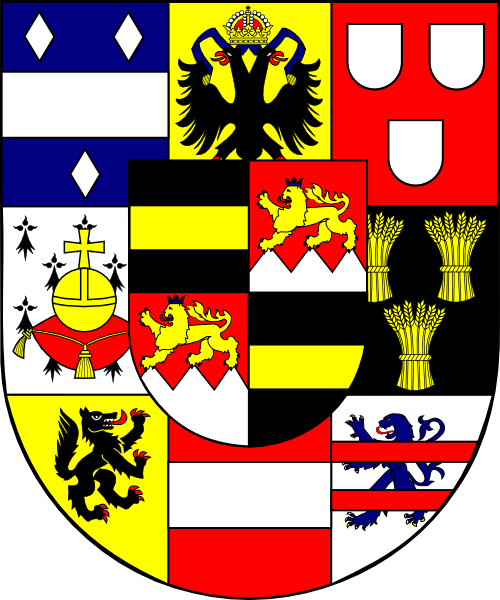
- Coat of arms

Franziskus von Paula Graf von Schönborn (Czech: František Schönborn; 24 January 1844 – 25 June 1899) was a Czech Catholic cardinal.

== Early life ==
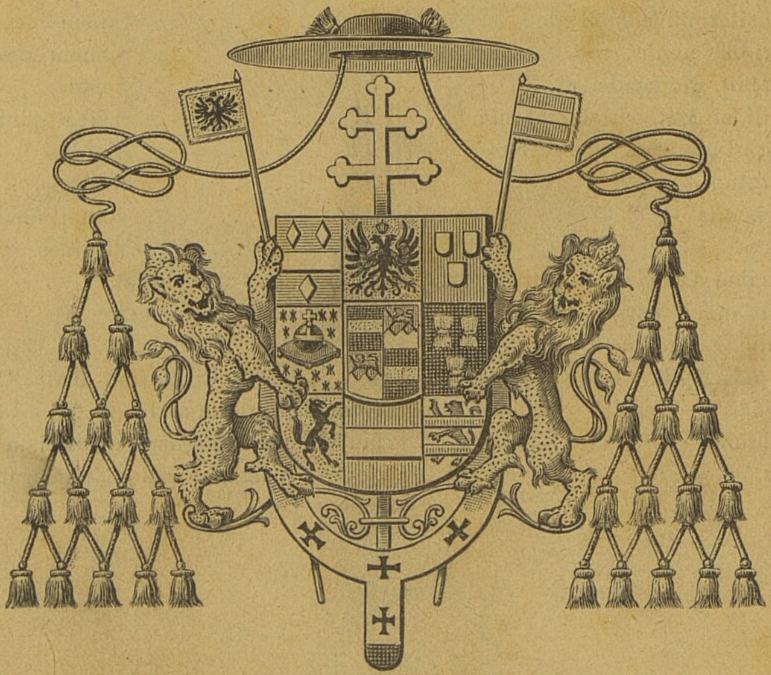
Cardinal Schönborn's coat of arms (1890)

Born at Prague on 24 January 1844 into an ancient noble House of Schönborn, he was the fourth son of Count Erwein Damian Hugo von Schönborn (1812–1881) and his wife, Countess Christina Maria Josefa von Brühl (1817–1902), granddaughter of Count Alois Friedrich von Brühl.

His paternal grandparents were Count Friedrich Karl Joseph von Schönborn and his wife, Baroness Maria Anna von Kerpen (younger daughter of Baron Wilhelm Lothar Maria von Kerpen and sister to Baroness Maria Charlotte Karolina von Kerpen (1782-1841), the wife of Ferdinand, 5th Prince Kinsky of Wchinitz and Tettau).

== Career ==
Schönborn served as the 5th Bishop of České Budějovice from 1883 to 1885, 28th Archbishop of Prague from 1885, and was created Cardinal-Priest of Santi Giovanni e Paolo in 1889.

Catholic Church titles
Preceded by Friedrich Johannes Jacob Celestin von Schwarzenberg	Archbishop of Prague; 1885–1899	Succeeded by Lev Skrbenský z Hříště
