= Christoph Schönborn =

Cardinal and archbishop of Vienna (born 1945)

His Eminence Christoph Schönborn OP
- Cardinal, Archbishop Emeritus of Vienna
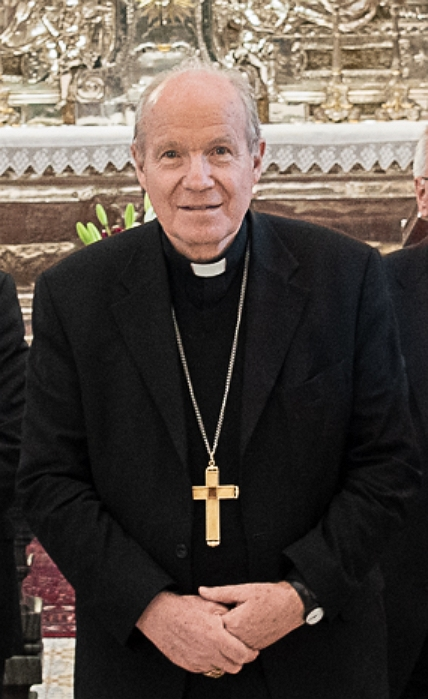
- Cardinal Schönborn in 2020
- Archdiocese: Vienna
- See: Vienna
- Appointed: 13 April 1995 (Coadjutor)
- Installed: 14 September 1995
- Term ended: 22 January 2025
- Predecessor: Hans Hermann Groër
- Successor: Josef Grünwidl
- Other posts: Cardinal-Priest of Gesù Divin Lavoratore; Ordinary for the Austrian Ordinariate for the Faithful of Eastern Rites; (1995–2026)
- Previous posts: Coadjutor Archbishop of Vienna (1995); Auxiliary bishop of Vienna (1991–1995); Titular bishop of Sutrium (1991–1995)

Orders
- Ordination: 27 December 1970 by Franz König
- Consecration: 29 September 1991 by Hans Hermann Groër
- Created cardinal: 21 February 1998 by John Paul II
- Rank: Cardinal Priest

Personal details
- Born: 22 January 1945 (age 81) Skalka Castle, Reichsgau Sudetenland, Germany (now Czech Republic)
- Denomination: Catholic Church
- Parents: Hugo-Damian, Graf von Schönborn, Eleonore Schönborn
- Motto: Vos autem dixi amicos (I have called you friends) — John 15:15
- Coat of arms

Styles of Christoph Schönborn
- Reference style: His Eminence
- Spoken style: Your Eminence
- Religious style: His Eminence
- Informal style: Cardinal
- See: Vienna

Christoph Maria Michael Hugo Damian Peter Adalbert Schönborn, OP (German: [ˈkrɪstɔf ˈʃøːnbɔrn]; born 22 January 1945) is a Bohemian-born Austrian Catholic prelate who served as Archbishop of Vienna from 1995 until 2025. He was chairman of the Austrian Bishops' Conference from 1998 to 2020 and was made a cardinal in 1998. He is a member of the Dominican Order.

Schönborn is Grand Chaplain of the Order of the Golden Fleece (Austrian branch), of which he has been a member since 1961. He is also a member of the formerly sovereign House of Schönborn, several members of which held high offices of the Holy Roman Empire and the Catholic Church as prince-bishops, prince-electors and cardinals.

== Family and early life ==
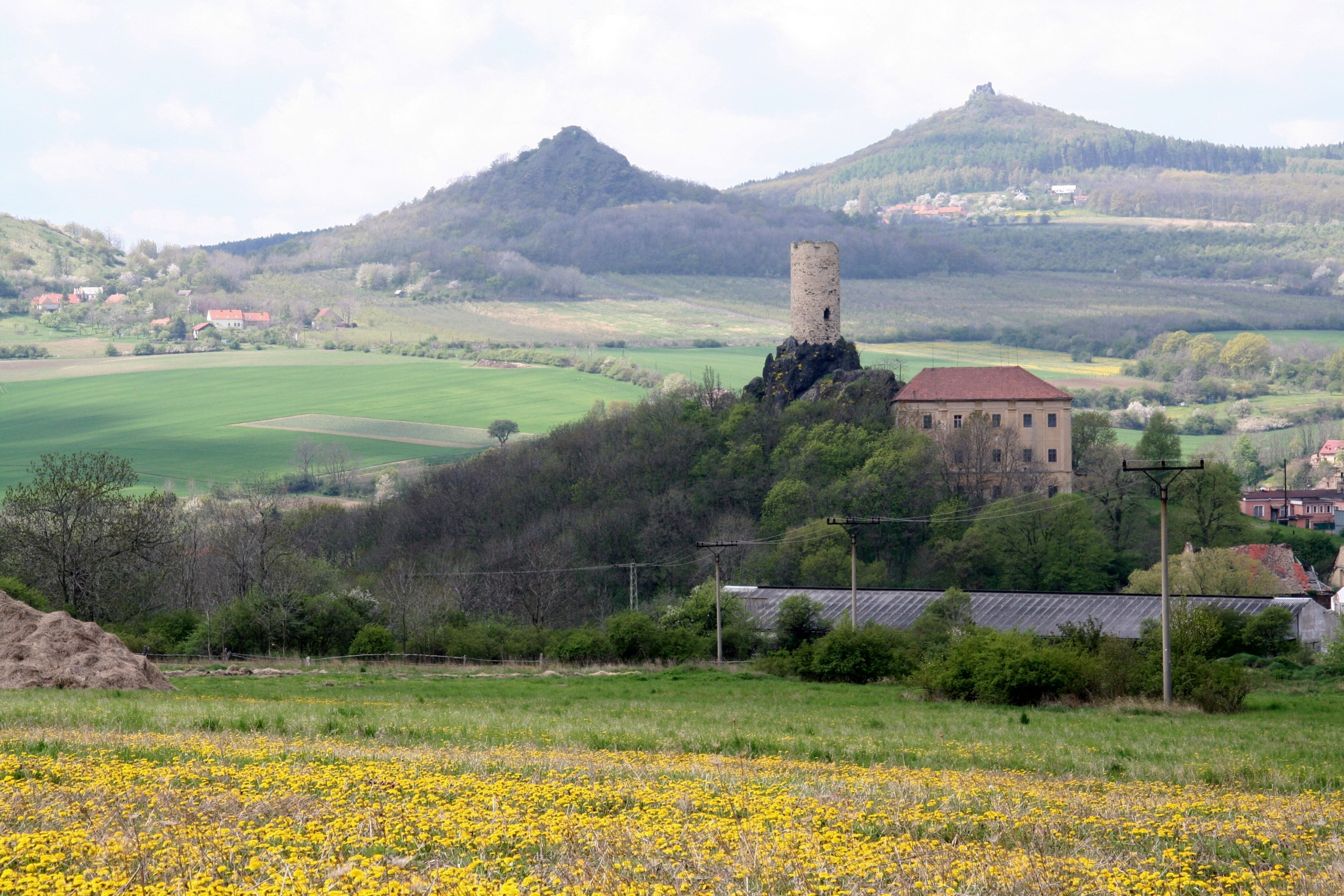
His birthplace and ancestral castle, Skalka Castle in modern Vlastislav

Schönborn was born at Skalka Castle, west of Litoměřice in Bohemia (then part of Sudetenland, a Nazi-annexed territory of Czechoslovakia, now part of the Czech Republic), the second son of Count Hugo-Damian von Schönborn (1916–1979), and his wife, Baroness Eleonore Ottilie Hilda Maria von Doblhoff. By birth, he is a member of an ancient German House of Schönborn whose members have historically borne the title of Imperial Count and the style of Illustrious Highness. Several members of the Schönborn family held high offices in the Catholic Church and, since the 17th century, the Holy Roman Empire, including several prince-bishops, cardinals and ecclesiastical prince-electors. One family member was Franziskus von Paula Graf von Schönborn, Cardinal-archbishop of Prague. When aristocratic titles were abolished in the First Czechoslovak Republic, after its independence in 1918, just as in Austria, his father officially lost his title of count, although titles continue to be used privately.

During the war, his father Hugo Damian was involved in the anti-Nazi resistance. Following the German withdrawal from Czechoslovakia at the end of World War II, Bohemia's German-speaking population, especially the nobility, was persecuted by the new rulers, first by Edvard Beneš' post-war nationalist government and then by the new Stalinist regime, and the family fled to Austria in 1945. His parents divorced in 1959. He has two brothers and one sister; his brother Michael Schönborn is an actor. He grew up in Schruns in western Austria, close to the border of the Swiss canton of Graubünden. Parts of his family live in France.

Growing up in Vorarlberg, Schönborn speaks the Vorarlberg dialect as well as Swiss German in addition to Standard German. In addition to his native German, Schönborn is fluent in French and Italian, and proficient in English, Spanish and Latin. He lived for several years in France and Switzerland.

He is a direct descendant of the Duchess of Bohemia Saint Ludmilla (860 Mělník – 921 Tetín).

== Early church career ==
In September 1945, his family was forced to flee from Bohemia. Schönborn took his Matura examination in 1963, and entered the Order of Preachers. He studied theology in Paris; and philosophy and psychology in Bornheim-Walberberg and Vienna. Schönborn also attended the Catholic Institute of Paris for further theological work, before studying Slavic and Byzantine Christianity at the Sorbonne.

Schönborn was ordained to the priesthood by Cardinal Franz König on 27 December 1970 in Vienna. He obtained a Licentiate of Sacred Theology in 1971, and later studied in Regensburg under Joseph Ratzinger (later Pope Benedict XVI). He subsequently completed a doctorate in Sacred Theology in Paris. From 1975 he was Professor of Dogmatics at the University of Fribourg, Switzerland. In 1980, he became a member of the International Theological Commission of the Holy See, and in 1987 he became editorial secretary for the Catechism of the Catholic Church. In 1991 he was chosen to become an auxiliary bishop of Vienna. Since 1996 Schönborn is the bishop responsible for the Community of the Lamb.

== Archbishop of Vienna ==
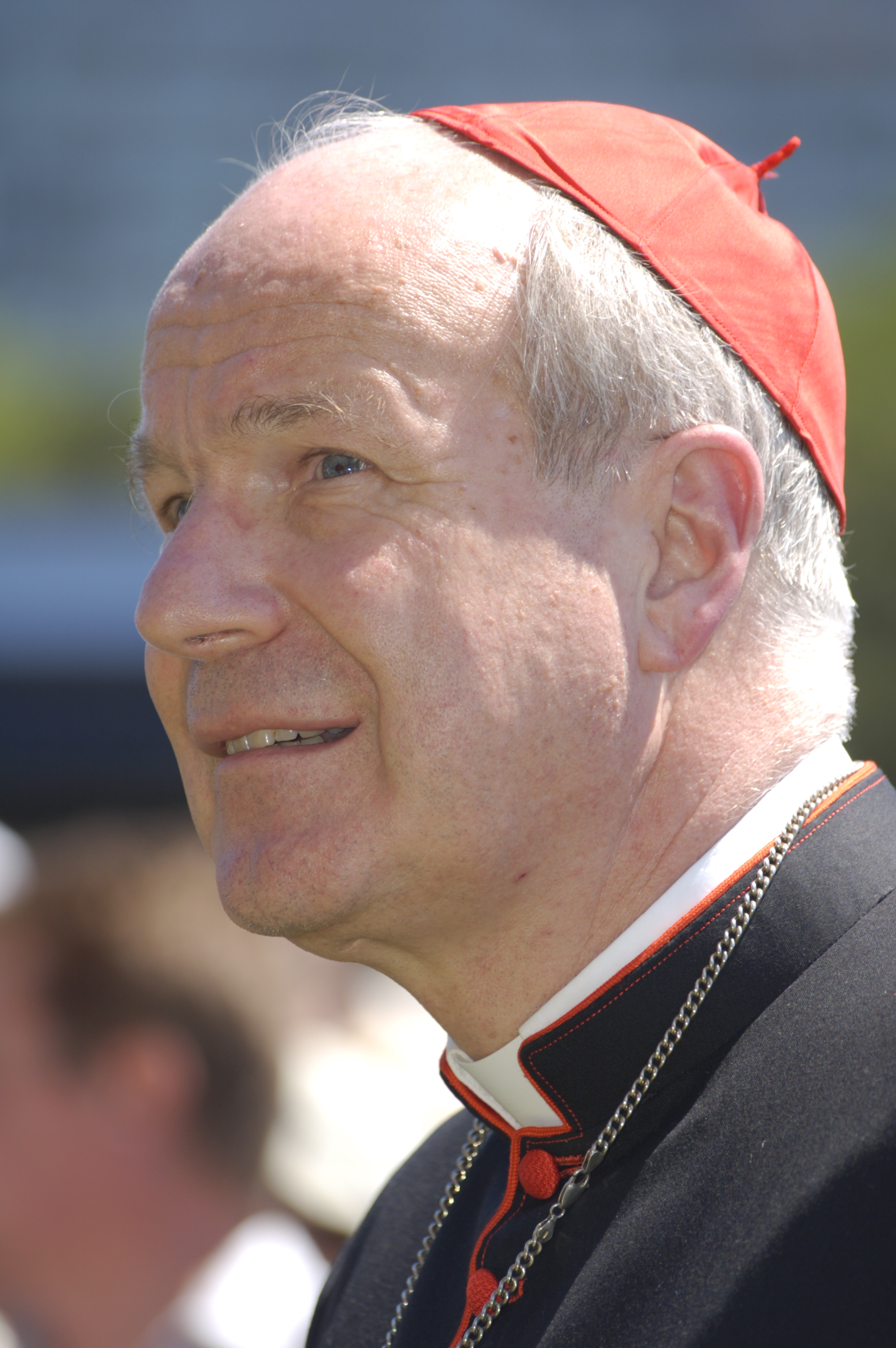
Schönborn at the consecration of the papal cross at Danube Park, Vienna, 2012

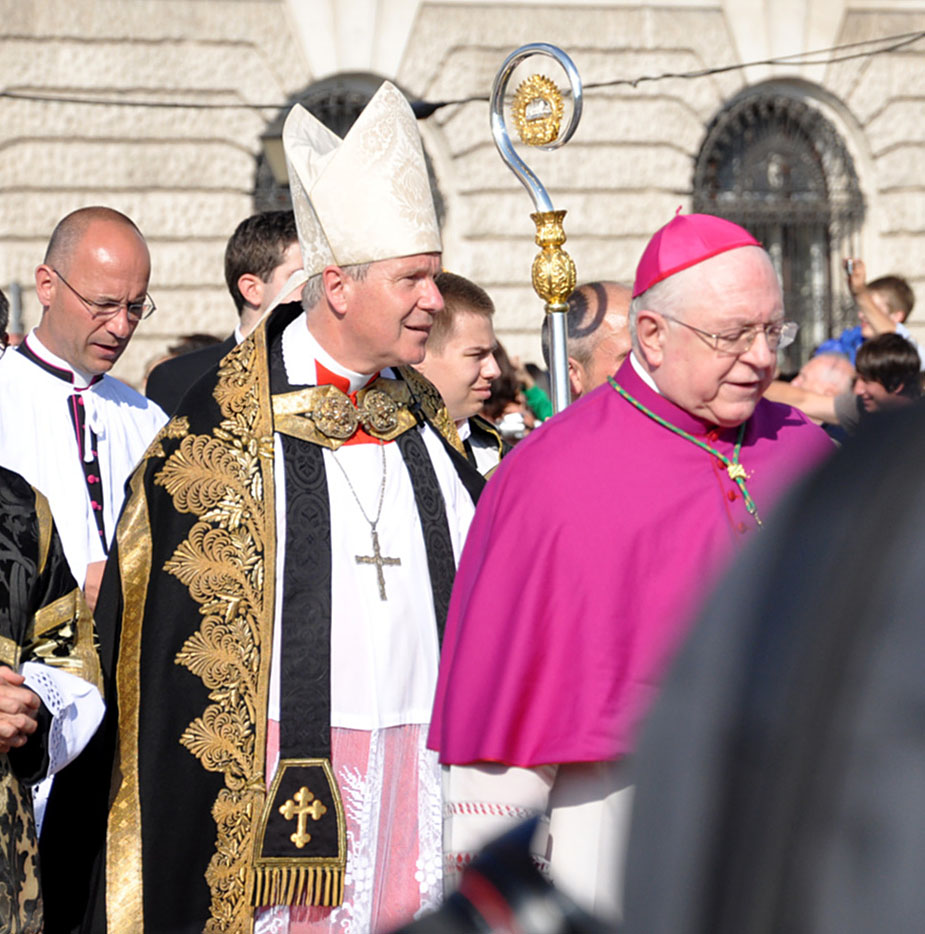
Schönborn (with crosier) and Archbishop Peter Stephan Zurbriggen walking in the Otto von Habsburg funeral procession

Schönborn was appointed Coadjutor Archbishop of Vienna on 11 April 1995 and succeeded as Archbishop of Vienna on 14 September 1995. He was created cardinal priest of Gesù Divin Lavoratore by Pope John Paul II in the consistory of 21 February 1998. Considered among the papabili following John Paul's death, Cardinal Schönborn was one of the cardinal electors who participated in the 2005 papal conclave that selected Pope Benedict XVI, and in the 2013 papal conclave that selected Pope Francis.

He became chairman of the Austrian Bishops Conference in 1998 when he was elected to the first of four six-year terms.

Schönborn served as a member of the Congregation for the Doctrine of the Faith, that for the Oriental Churches, and that for Catholic Education, and of the Pontifical Council for Culture and the Pontifical Commission for the Cultural Heritage of the Church. On 5 January 2011 he was appointed among the first members of the newly created Pontifical Council for the Promotion of the New Evangelisation. On 30 November 2013, Pope Francis confirmed Cardinal Schönborn as a Member of the Education Congregation.

Schönborn also serves as the Grand Chaplain to the Austrian Order of the Golden Fleece. Schönborn's episcopal motto is Vos autem dixi amicos (I have called you friends) from John 15:15. His coat of arms as archbishop and cardinal includes in its upper sinister field the family arms of the Schönborn family.

Schönborn presided over the Funeral of Otto von Habsburg, former Crown Prince of Austria-Hungary, in St. Stephen's Cathedral on 16 July 2011.

On 18 September 2012, Schönborn was named by Pope Benedict XVI as a Synod Father for the October 2012 13th Ordinary General Assembly of the Synod of Bishops on the New Evangelization.

Schönborn visited Iran in February 2001 and met with Ayatollah Ali Khamenei. Schönborn was one of the highest-ranked Catholic Church officials to visit the country since the 1980–88 Iran–Iraq War.

Schönborn has been described as an accomplished crisis manager. He had a close relationship with Pope Benedict XVI, whom he knew for decades, and has been referred to as Benedict's "spiritual son".

On 1 December 2017, Schönborn presided over an interconfessional prayer service entitled Mozart Requiem in his cathedral church for World AIDS Day. The event was co-hosted by the LGBT activist Gery Keszler.

On 1 December 2018, he invited in the St. Stephen's Cathedral a rock ensemble to perform a flamboyant play called Jedermann (reloaded), which was based on the early 20th-century play of that name by Hugo von Hofmannsthal.

=== Response to the sex abuse scandal ===
In May 2010 Schönborn told the Austrian Catholic news agency Kathpress, "the days of cover-up are over. For a long while the Church's principle of forgiveness was falsely interpreted and was in favour of those responsible and not the victims," while praising Pope Benedict XVI for having pushed for sex abuse inquiries when he was a cardinal. Schönborn has earned much recognition for his handling of the abuse scandal surrounding his predecessor as Vienna Archbishop Hans Hermann Groër, who stepped down from office in 1995. In 1998, Schönborn publicly confirmed that he believed the allegations against Groër. In 2010, he explained that the future Pope Benedict XVI had long pressed for a full investigation of the case, but had met with resistance. A sex abuse victims group named him as one of two promising cardinals they saw as good candidates for the papacy in 2013.

=== Gerhard Wagner controversy ===
In January 2009, Gerhard Maria Wagner was appointed by Pope Benedict XVI, without consultation with the Austrian bishops' conference, as an auxiliary bishop of Linz, Austria. Wagner was known for highly conservative views, in particular for blaming the Hurricane Katrina on the sins of the New Orleans' homosexuals and abortionists. Wagner's appointment generated protests in Austria and a boycott by many priests of the Linz diocese. Schönborn quickly joined the public criticism of the appointment. He made an emergency trip to Rome and in mid-February 2009, Wagner was persuaded to not present himself for episcopal ordination.

=== Response to dissident priest movement ===
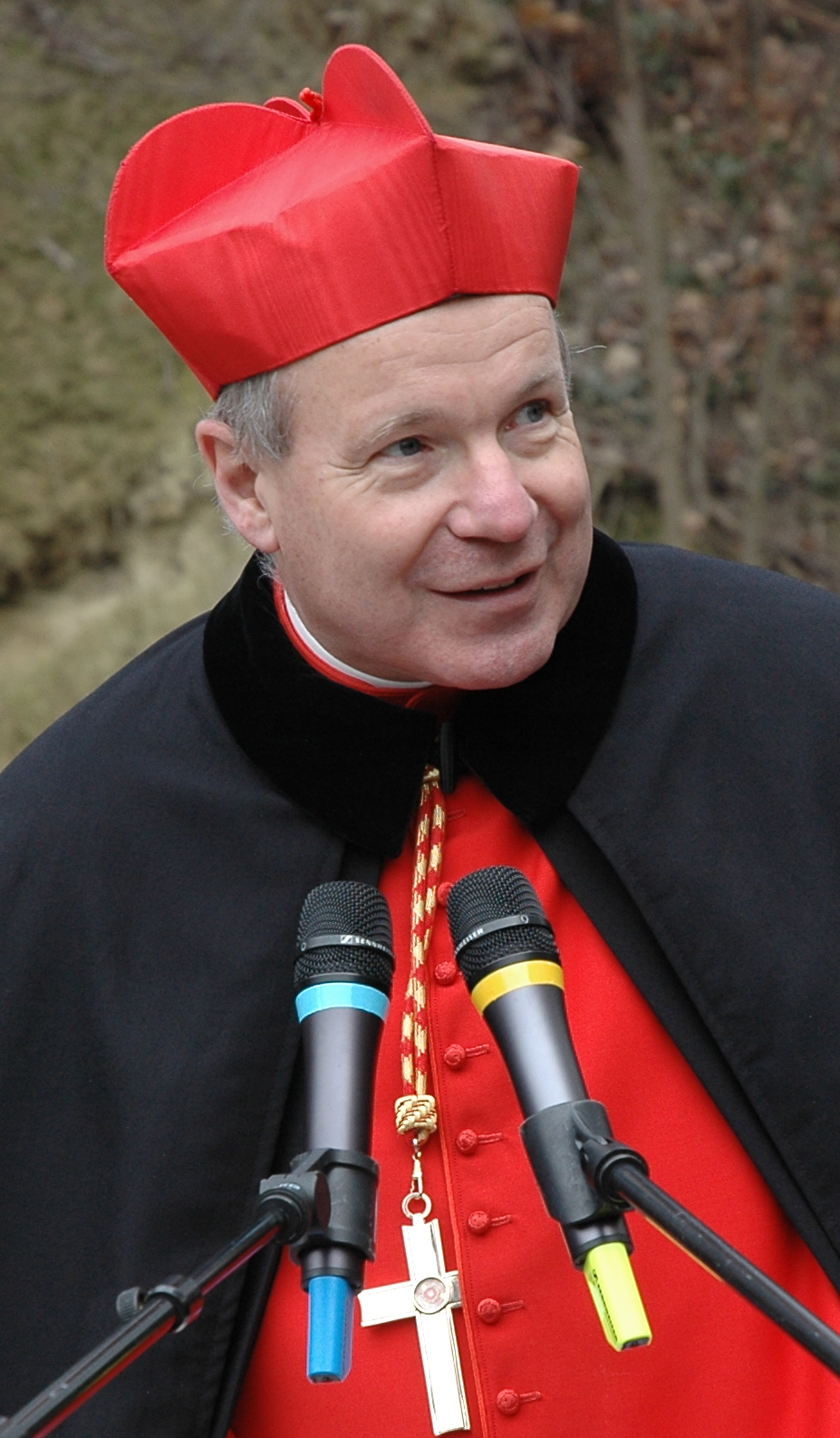
Schönborn, 2007

As the Archbishop of Vienna and the head of the Catholic Church in Austria, Schönborn has faced an open and highly publicized rebellion by a movement of Austrian dissident clergy known as the Pfarrer Initiative or Parish priests' Initiative. The group, formed in 2005, and comprising about 10% of the Austrian clergy, has been publicly advocating a number of radical religious reforms, such as ordination of women, allowing priests to marry, allowing divorced Catholics and non-Catholic Christians to receive communion, and others. In 2011 the Pfarrer Initiative attracted considerable attention with the publication of the group's manifesto called "Call to Disobedience." Cardinal Schönborn met with the supporters of the initiative, but in June 2012 he publicly reaffirmed the official position of the Vatican on the issues raised by the dissident group and directed that no priest expressing support for the "Call to Disobedience" be allowed to hold any administrative post in the Austrian Catholic Church. In September 2012 Schönborn again "backed celibacy for priests, limiting ordination to men and preserving marriage as a life-long commitment" and reiterated a warning to the dissident clergy that they faced serious consequences if they continued to advocate disobedience to the Vatican.

== Views ==
Schönborn has been described as a "conciliatory pragmatist who is open to dialogue".

=== Interfaith dialogue ===
Schönborn is a member of the Elijah Interfaith Institute Board of World Religious Leaders.

In May 2017, Schönborn published an approbation in regards to the Orthodox Rabbinic Statement on Christianity entitled To Do the Will of Our Father in Heaven: Toward a Partnership between Jews and Christians which was published two years beforehand by the Israel-based Center for Jewish–Christian Understanding and Cooperation (CJCUC).

=== Islam and Catholicism ===
In 2006, Schönborn published an article on the relationship between Catholicism and Islam, noting that both are missionary religions and interfaith dialogue is often seen as an alternative to the missionary impulse. He advised that dialogue focus on "How is mission situated in respect of freedom of conscience and of religion? How is it situated in respect of the requirements of a plural world?", while addressing "openly the dangers of intolerance, of attacks on religious freedom". When news outlets reported in 2016 that he had warned of "an Islamic conquest of Europe", Schönborn pointed out that he had asked the question "Will there be an Islamic conquest of Europe?" in a sermon that identified Europe with the prodigal son in Luke's gospel who has squandered his inheritance. He argued that if Islam stood to gain it was because "We ourselves are therefore those that have brought the Christian inheritance of Europe into peril." He objected to any reading of his words as an attack on refugees. He wrote: "Europe's Christian legacy is in danger, because we Europeans have squandered it. That has absolutely nothing to do with Islam nor with the refugees. It is clear that many Islamists would like to take advantage of our weakness, but they are not responsible for it. We are."

=== Same-sex relationships ===
In a September 2015 interview, he said that the Church's ministers should recognise what is good where it is found. For example, he said, a civil marriage is better than simply living together, because it signifies a couple has made a formal, public commitment to one another. "Instead of talking about everything that is missing, we can draw close to this reality, noting what is positive in this love that is establishing itself." Schönborn described a gay friend of his who, after many temporary relationships, is now in a stable relationship. "It's an improvement. They share a life, they share their joys and sufferings, they help one another. It must be recognised that this person took an important step for his own good and the good of others, even though it certainly is not a situation the Church can consider 'regular'." The Church's negative "judgment about homosexual acts is necessary, but the Church should not look in the bedroom first, but in the dining room! It must accompany people." He said that pastoral accompaniment "cannot transform an irregular situation into a regular one, but there do exist paths for healing, for learning", for moving gradually closer to a situation in compliance with Church teaching.

In 2021, Schönborn said he cannot deny same-sex couples a blessing if they request one and that he was "not happy" with the Vatican's mid-March statement on same-sex unions. In September 2024, when asked about Fiducia supplicans Schönborn said he believed the document showed "confusion on the part of the Church."

=== HIV/AIDS and condoms ===
In 1996, Schönborn told an Austrian television audience that someone suffering from AIDS might use a condom as a "lesser evil", but he quickly cautioned, "no one could affirm that the use of a condom is the ideal in sexual relations".

=== Tridentine Mass ===
In 2024, when asked about the 2021 motu proprio Traditionis custodes that placed restrictions on use of the Tridentine Mass, Schönborn said that he hoped that the "new generation" might "easily" move from the 'TLM to modern movements and "prayer groups" such as the Emmanuel Community, adding "Let us accept that Francis has his reasons for closing the doors again, at least partially, just as we have accepted that Benedict XVI had his reasons for opening them. Let us trust that the Lord is leading the Church."

=== Evolution and the Catholic Church ===
In an opinion piece that appeared in The New York Times on 7 July 2005, Schönborn accepted the possibility of evolution but criticised certain "neo-Darwinian" theories as incompatible with Catholic teaching:

Evolution in the sense of common ancestry might be true, but evolution in the neo-Darwinian sense – an unguided, unplanned process of random variation and natural selection – is not. Any system of thought that denies or seeks to explain away the overwhelming evidence for design in biology is ideology, not science.

The director of the Vatican Observatory, the Jesuit George Coyne, criticized Schönborn's view and pointed to Pope John Paul II's declaration that "evolution is no longer a mere hypothesis" and Catholic physicist Stephen Barr wrote a critique which evoked several replies, including a lengthy one from Schönborn.

=== Gay pastoral council member ===
In April 2012, the election of a young gay man, who was living in a registered same-sex partnership, to a pastoral council in Vienna was vetoed by the parish priest. After meeting with the couple, Schönborn reinstated him. He later advised in a homily that priests must apply a pastoral approach that is "neither rigorist nor lax" in counselling Catholics who "don't live according to [God's] master plan".

=== Reform of clerical celibacy ===
On 14 April 2019, Schönborn expressed openness to the possibility of married men being ordained to the priesthood (something which already occurs in the Eastern Catholic Churches and the Anglican ordinariate), while maintaining clerical celibacy as normative.

== Health and retirement plans ==
Schönborn's coat of arms as a cardinal and archbishop

On 22 March 2019, Schönborn revealed that he was suffering from prostate cancer and would not appear in public until after surgery in May 2019. On 9 May, the Archdiocese of Vienna announced that his surgery was successful.

On 21 January 2020, the Archdiocese of Vienna announced that Pope Francis would not accept Schönborn's resignation when he turned 75, but only when it was ready to name his successor. Schönborn submitted his resignation as president of the Austrian Bishops Conference on 16 June 2020, after four years of his six-year term.

Pope Francis accepted Schönborn's resignation on 22 January 2025, his 80th birthday, without naming his successor.

== Bibliography ==
- L'Icône du Christ: Fondements théologiques élaborés entre le 1er et le 2e Concile de Nicée (325-787) (Editions universitaires de Fribourg, 1976)
- Living the Catechism of the Catholic Church: A Brief Commentary on the Catechism for Every Week of the Year (Ignatius)
  - Volume I: The Creed
  - Volume II: The Sacraments
  - Volume III: Life in Christ
  - Volume IV: Paths of Prayer
- Chance or Purpose? Creation, Evolution, and a Rational Faith (Ignatius, 2007) ISBN 9781586172121
- The Source of Life: Exploring the Mystery of the Eucharist (Crossroad, 2007) ISBN 9780824524777
- (foreword) Creation and Evolution: A Conference with Pope Benedict XVI in Castel Gandolfo (Ignatius, 2008) ISBN 9781586172343
- Jesus, the Divine Physician: Encountering Christ in the Gospel of Luke (Ignatius, 2008) ISBN 9781586171803
- Who Needs God?: Barbara Stöckl in conversation with Christoph Cardinal Schönborn (Ignatius, 2009) ISBN 9781586172848
- God Sent His Son: A Contemporary Christology (Ignatius, 2010) ISBN 9781586174101
- The Joy of Being a Priest: Following the Cure of Ars (Ignatius, 2010) ISBN 9781586174767

== Ancestry ==
Ancestors of Christoph Schönborn

8. Count Johann von Schönborn
4. Count Karl Johann von Schönborn
9. Countess Anna von Wurmbrand-Stuppach
2. Count Hugo Damian von Schönborn
10. Count Heinrich von Nostitz-Rieneck
5. Countess Elisabeth von Nostitz-Rieneck
11. Countess Marie Chotek von Wognin
1. Christoph Schönborn
12. Baron Rudolf von Doblhoff
6. Baron Herbert von Doblhoff
13. Dorothea Edle von Littrow
3. Baroness Eleonore von Doblhoff
14. Hubert Ritter von Skutetzky
7. Gertud von Skutetzky
15. Anna Amalia Berwer

Catholic Church titles
New title	— TITULAR — Titular bishop of Sutri; 11 July 1991 – 13 April 1995	Succeeded by Paolo Sardi
Preceded by Kurt Krenn	Auxiliary bishop of Vienna; 11 July 1991 – 13 April 1995	Succeeded by Alois Schwarz
Preceded by Hans Hermann Groër	Archbishop of Vienna; 14 September 1995 – 22 January 2025	Succeeded by Josef Grünwidl
Preceded by Hans Hermann Groër	Ordinariate for Byzantine-Rite Catholics in Austria; 6 November 1995 –	Incumbent
Preceded by Joseph Louis Bernardin	Cardinal priest of Gesù Divin Lavoratore; 21 February 1998 –	Incumbent
Preceded by Johann Weber	President of the Episcopal Conference of Austria; 30 June 1998 – 16 June 2020	Succeeded by Franz Lackner
