= Michael Schönborn =

Austrian actor

Michael Anatol Maria Hugo Karl Schönborn (born 2 November 1954 in Schruns) is an Austrian actor, and the brother of Cardinal Christoph Schönborn.

== Early life and ancestry ==
Michael Anatol Maria Hugo Karl was born at Schruns, Austria, as the youngest son of Count Hugo-Damian von Schönborn (1916-1979), and his wife, Baroness Eleonore Ottilie Hilda Maria von Doblhoff. He is a member of an ancient House of Schönborn whose members have historically borne the title of Imperial Count and the style of Illustrious Highness. Several members of the Schönborn family held high offices in the Catholic Church and, since the 17th century, the Holy Roman Empire, including several prince-bishops, cardinals and ecclesiastical prince-electors.

== Career ==
He completed his acting training at the Neue Münchner Schauspielschule. He lives near Berlin and became known for his performances in TV series such as Der Winzerkönig, SOKO Kitzbühel and Zodiak. Lately, he has also performed in musicals. Schönborn starred in Sister Act at the Ronacher in Vienna as a priest.

== Engagements ==
- Deutsches Schauspielhaus Hamburg
- Thalia Theater Hamburg
- Free theatre Kampnagelfabrik Hamburg
- Hamburg Kammerspiele
- Theater Basel
- Theater am Turm Frankfurt am Main
- Komödie am Kurfürstendamm Berlin
- Ronacher, Vienna
- Theater in der Josefstadt, Vienna

== Awards ==
- 2017 Nestroy Theatre Prize nomination for Maria Stuart (Stadttheater Klagenfurt) as the best federal state performance

=== Memberships ===
- Member of the Deutsche Filmakademie.
