= Vlastislav (Litoměřice District) =

- Municipality
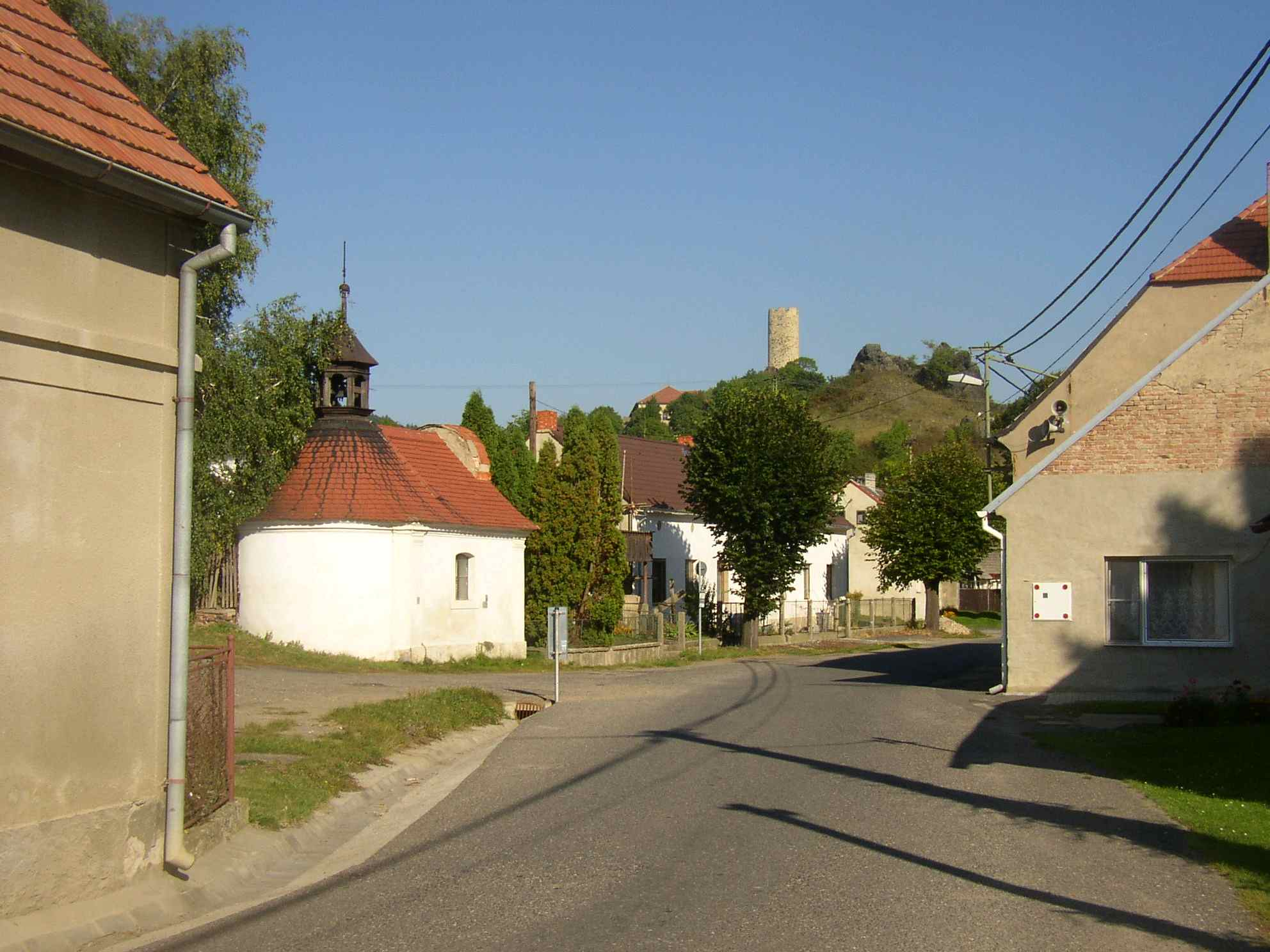
- Centre of Vlastislav

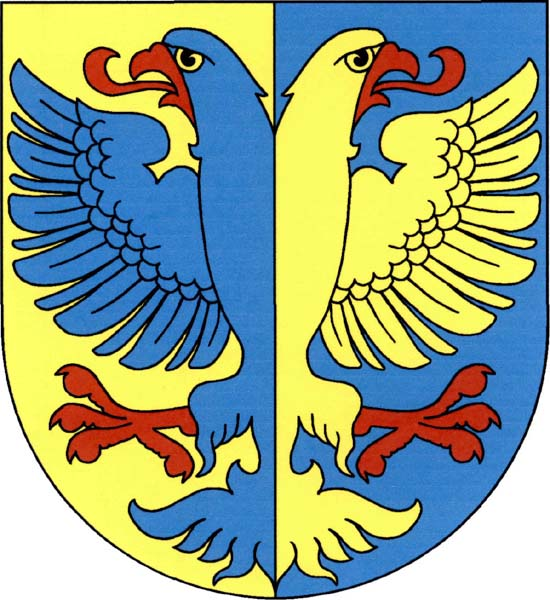
- Flag Coat of arms

- Location in the Czech Republic
- Coordinates: 50°29′49″N 13°57′20″E
- Country: Czech Republic
- Region: Ústí nad Labem
- District: Litoměřice
- First mentioned: 1184

Area
  - Total: 5.64 km^{2} (2.18 sq mi)
- Elevation: 287 m (942 ft)

Population (2026-01-01)
  - Total: 167
  - Density: 29.6/km^{2} (76.7/sq mi)
- Time zone: UTC+1 (CET)
  - Summer (DST): UTC+2 (CEST)
- Postal code: 411 14
- Website: www.obec-vlastislav.cz

Vlastislav (German: Watislaw) is a municipality and village in Litoměřice District in the Ústí nad Labem Region of the Czech Republic. It has about 200 inhabitants.

== Etymology ==
The name is derived from the given name Vlastislav.

== Geography ==
Vlastislav is located about 13 kilometres (8 mi) west of Litoměřice and 19 km (12 mi) south of Ústí nad Labem. It lies in the Central Bohemian Uplands and within the České Středohoří Protected Landscape Area. The highest point is the hill Plešivec at 477 m (1,565 ft) above sea level.

== History ==
The first written mention of Vlastislav is from 1184, but there was a gord already in the early Middle Ages. According to legend in Chronica Boemorum, the gord was founded by Prince Vlastislav.

== Demographics ==
Historical population

Year	Pop.	±%
1869	391	—
1880	375	−4.1%
1890	389	+3.7%
1900	349	−10.3%
1910	344	−1.4%

Year	Pop.	±%
1921	338	−1.7%
1930	331	−2.1%
1950	271	−18.1%
1961	264	−2.6%
1970	185	−29.9%

Year	Pop.	±%
1980	160	−13.5%
1991	128	−20.0%
2001	146	+14.1%
2011	151	+3.4%
2021	178	+17.9%

Source: Censuses

== Transport ==
There are no railways or major roads passing through the municipality.

== Sights ==
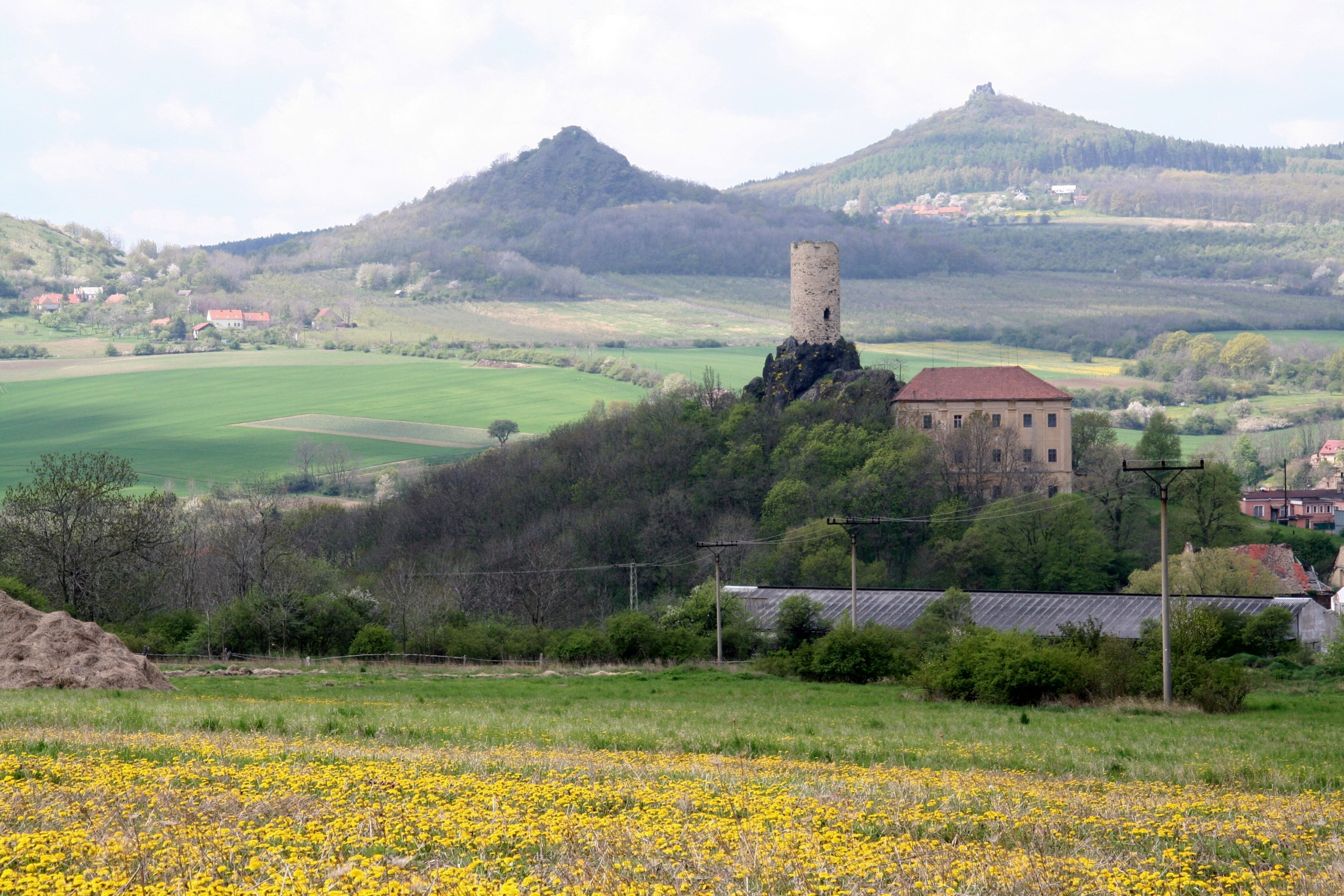
Skalka Castle, birthplace of Christoph Schönborn

Vlastislav is known for the ruins of the Skalka Castle. The first documented owner of the castle was Petr of Skalka in 1357–1360, but the castle may be older. The castle was devastated by the Swedish army during the Thirty Years' War in 1639 and was never restored. Only the bergfried of the castle has survived to this day. After the war, a new Baroque castle was built next to the ruins, possibly according to plans by Antonio della Porta. Building materials from the old dilapidated castle were partly used. Today, various exhibitions and expositions are located in its interiors.

== Notable people ==
- Christoph Schönborn (born 1945), Austrian cardinal, Archbishop of Vienna
