= Wilhelm Lothar Maria von Kerpen =

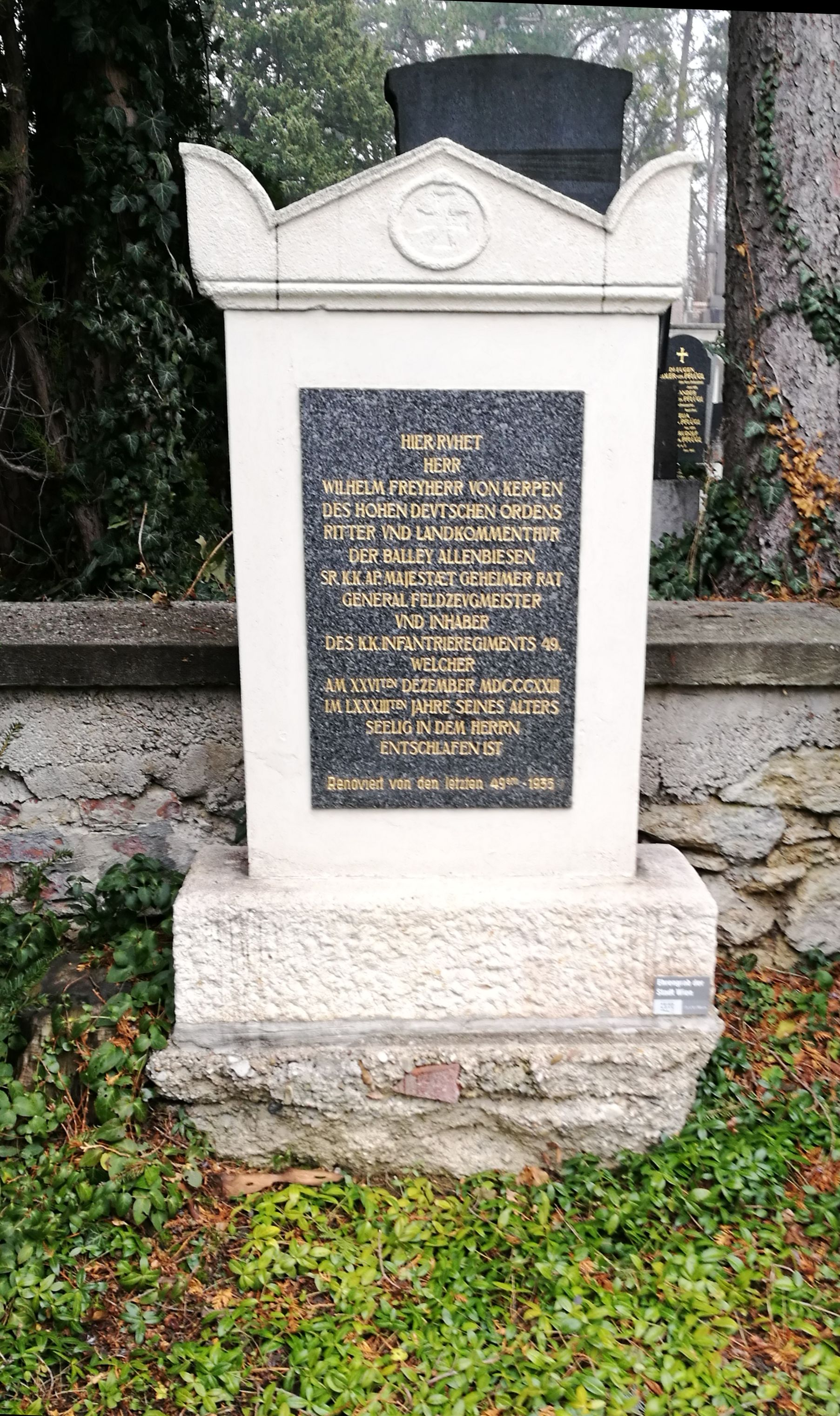
- Born: 24 May 1741; Illingen, Holy Roman Empire
- Died: 26 December 1823 (aged 82) Vienna, Austria
- Allegiance: Austrian Empire
- Branch: Infantry
- Rank: Feldzeugmeister
- Conflicts: French Revolutionary Wars; Napoleonic Wars
- Awards: Knight of the Teutonic Order (1765)
- Other work: Inhaber Infantry Regiment Nr. 49; Privy Councilor (1807); Chamberlain (1807); Aulic Council (1810–1813)

Wilhelm Lothar Maria, Freiherr von Kerpen (24 May 1741 – 26 December 1823) was an Austrian general.

== Early life ==
Kerpen was the son of Baron Lothar Franz von Kerpen (1706-1768) and his wife, Maria Charlotte Mohr von Wald (1709-1789). He received his initial education at the court of the Elector of Trier Franz Georg von Schönborn before beginning his studies at the University of Würzburg.

== Career ==
Kerpen joined the army of Habsburg Austria and rose to the rank of general officer during the French Revolutionary Wars. He led a brigade under Prince Josias of Saxe-Coburg-Saalfeld during the War of the First Coalition. In the spring of 1796 he transferred to Italy where he commanded a brigade at the start of the Montenotte Campaign. Later that year he was ordered to help defend the County of Tyrol. After being promoted to Feldmarschall-Leutnant, he led a force against Barthélemy Catherine Joubert's French corps at Salorno, Klausen, and Brixen in March 1797. That year he became Proprietor (Inhaber) of Infantry Regiment Nr. 49, a position he held until his death.

Kerpen was deputy to the commanding general of Bohemia from 1803 to 1807. He became Imperial Privy Councilor and Chamberlain in 1807. He was commanding general of Inner Austria from 1807 to 1809, during which time he received promotion to Feldzeugmeister. He served as Vice President of the Aulic Council from January 1810 to November 1813. In the latter year he retired from military service.

== Personal life ==
He married Baroness Maria Antoinette von Hornstein-Göffingen (1757-1828). Together, they were the parents of four daughters, including:

- Karolina Maria von Kerpen (1782–1841), who married Ferdinand, 5th Prince Kinsky of Wchinitz and Tettau, the elder son of Joseph, 4th Prince Kinsky of Wchinitz and Tettau.
- Anna Maria von Kerpen (1784–1862), who married Count Friedrich Karl Joseph von Schönborn, youngest son of Count Hugo Damian Erwein von Schönborn-Wiesentheid, in 1811.

Baron von Kerpen died at Vienna in 1823.

=== Descendants ===
Through his daughter Karolina, he was a grandfather or Rudolf, 6th Prince Kinsky of Wchinitz and Tettau (who married Countess Wilhelmine of Colloredo-Mansfeld), and Count Joseph Sidonius Kinsky of Wchinitz and Tettau (who married Countess Marie Henriette Czernin of Chudenitz).
