= Kerpen (surname) =

Kerpen or von Kerpen is a surname. Notable people with the surname include:

- Otto von Kerpen (died 1208), Grand Master of the Teutonic Knights
- Phil Kerpen, American policy analyst and political organizer
- Wilhelm Lothar Maria von Kerpen (1741–1823), Austrian general
