= House of Schönborn =

Noble family of the Holy Roman Empire

Coordinates: 49°57′26″N 7°28′26″E

- Country: Schönborn, Franconia
- Place of origin: Schönborn, Katzenelnbogen
- Founded: 1275; 751 years ago
- Founder: H. von Sconenburne
- Current head: Friedrich Karl, Count of Schönborn-Buchheim
- Final ruler: Hugo Damian Erwein von Schönborn-Wiesentheid
- Estates: List: Schönborn Palace (Prague); Schloss Gaibach; Schloss Weißenstein; Palais Schönborn-Batthyány; Schönborn Palace (Karpaty); Chynadiiovo Castle; Among others (see Private residences)
- Deposition: 1806 (German mediatisation)
- Branches: Schönborn-Buchheim; Schönborn-Heusenstamm (extinct); Schönborn-Wiesentheid

The House of Schönborn ([ˈʃøːnbɔʁn]) is an ancient noble family of the Holy Roman Empire. As a formerly sovereign and mediatized family, it belongs to the Hochadel (German for 'high nobility').

Various members of the family have held high offices of the Catholic Church and the Holy Roman Empire over the course of centuries, including as bishops, prince-bishops, cardinals and prince-electors. In addition to several family members having been elected rulers of ecclesiastical principalities — the Electorate of Mainz, the Princely-Bishopric of Würzburg, the Princely-Bishopric of Worms, the Princely-Bishopric of Speyer, the Electorate of Trier, and the Princely-Bishopric of Bamberg — the family possessed a fief in Franconia that held imperial immediacy as a county within the Holy Roman Empire, the County of Schönborn.

The House of Schönborn, especially its ruling prelates of the Catholic Church, were among the most important builders of Southern German baroque architecture. The family gave the name Schönbornzeit (Age of the Schönborns) to an era (1642–1756), sometimes nostalgically remembered in the popular consciousness as an era of prosperity. Today, the term Schönbornzeit denotes a particular style of Rhenish and Franconian baroque.

== History ==
=== Early history ===
The Schönborn family first appeared in the Rheingau region with H. von Sconenburne in 1275. Their original seat was Schönborn in the County of Katzenelnbogen. A secondary source of 1670 mentions an earlier Eucharius von Schönborn of the mid 12th century, however without documentary proof. The lion in their coat of arms may derive from the Katzenelnbogen as well as from the nearby Diez counts whose vassals they were. By the end of the 14th century, the family had split into three branches one of which extinguished soon. The elder branch resided at Schönborn and held the office of Burgmann at Burgschwalbach, a castle built between 1354 and 1371 by count Eberhard V. of Katzenelnbogen. Gilbrecht of Schönborn was mentioned there in 1373. They were also Burgmanns at Hahnstätten in the County of Nassau. Several of them became abbots, one a grand bailiff of the Knights Hospitaller. The younger branch were vassals in the Westerwald region, in the service of the Barony of Westerburg, the Electorate of Trier, the Electorate of Mainz and the county of Wied.

In the 16th century many younger sons of the family became Domherren (canons), leading to the extinction of both branches, with the exception of a side line of the younger branch that had received the fiefs of Freienfels (near Weinbach) and Eschbach (near Weilmünster).

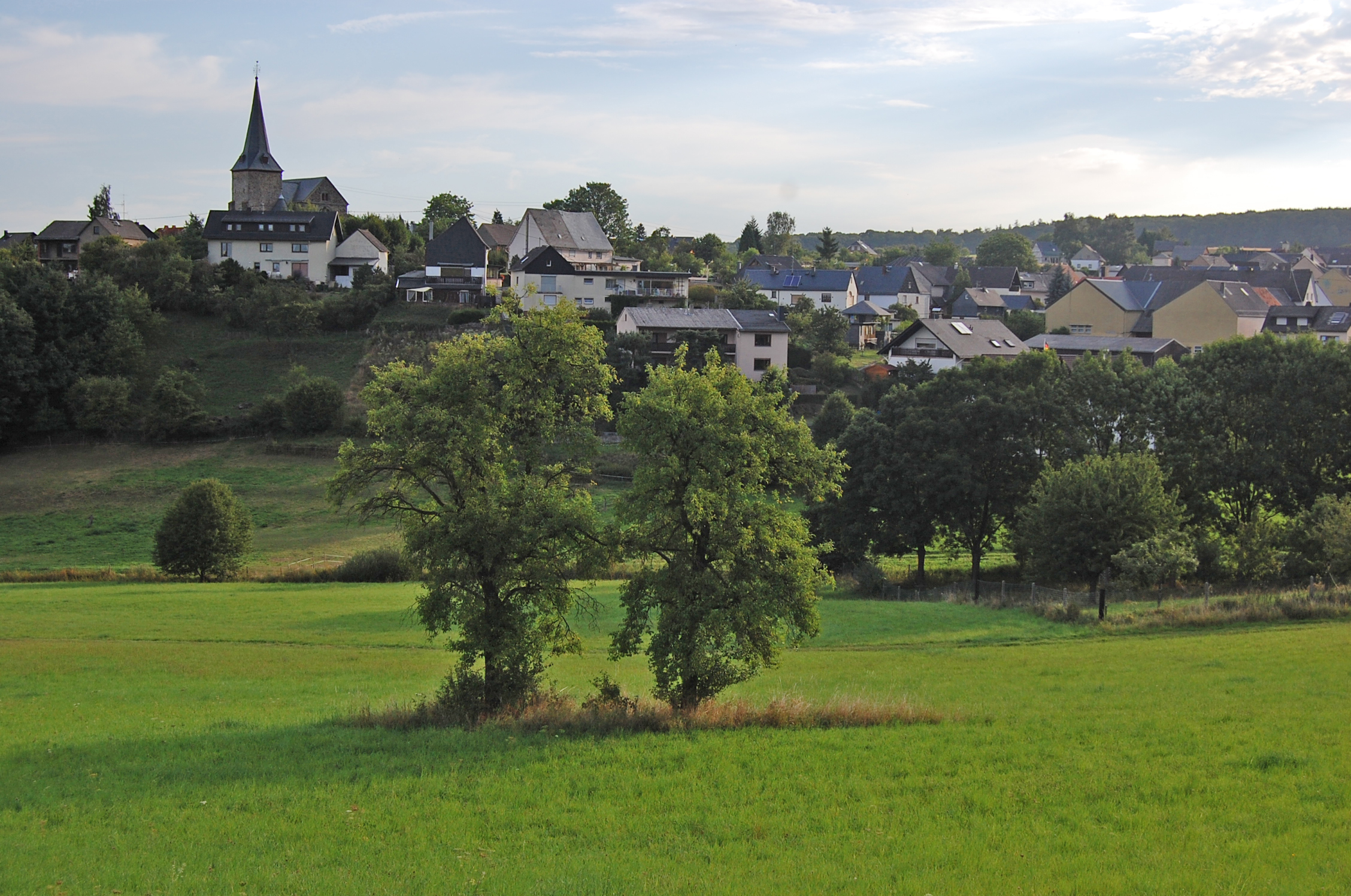
Schönborn

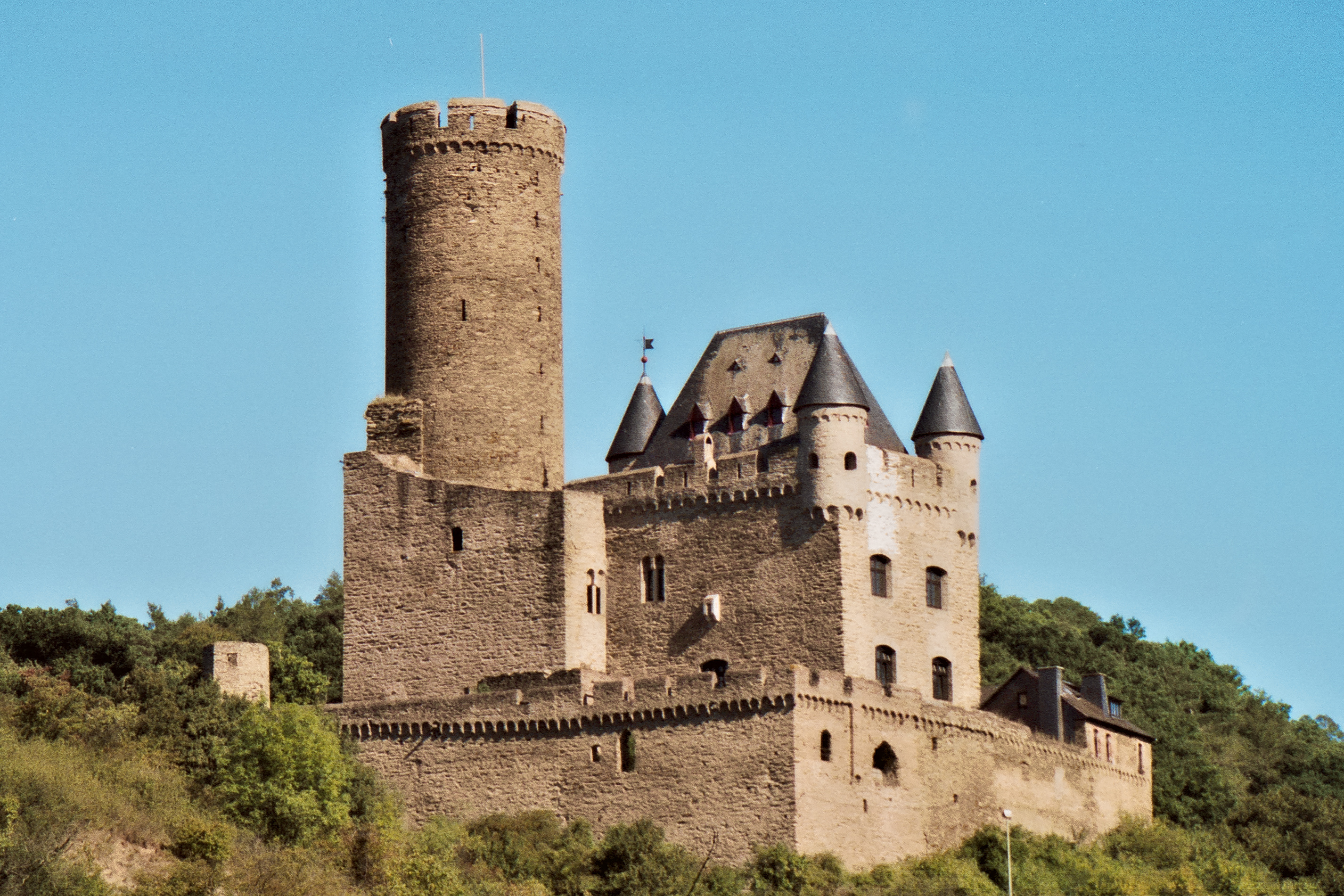
Burgschwalbach

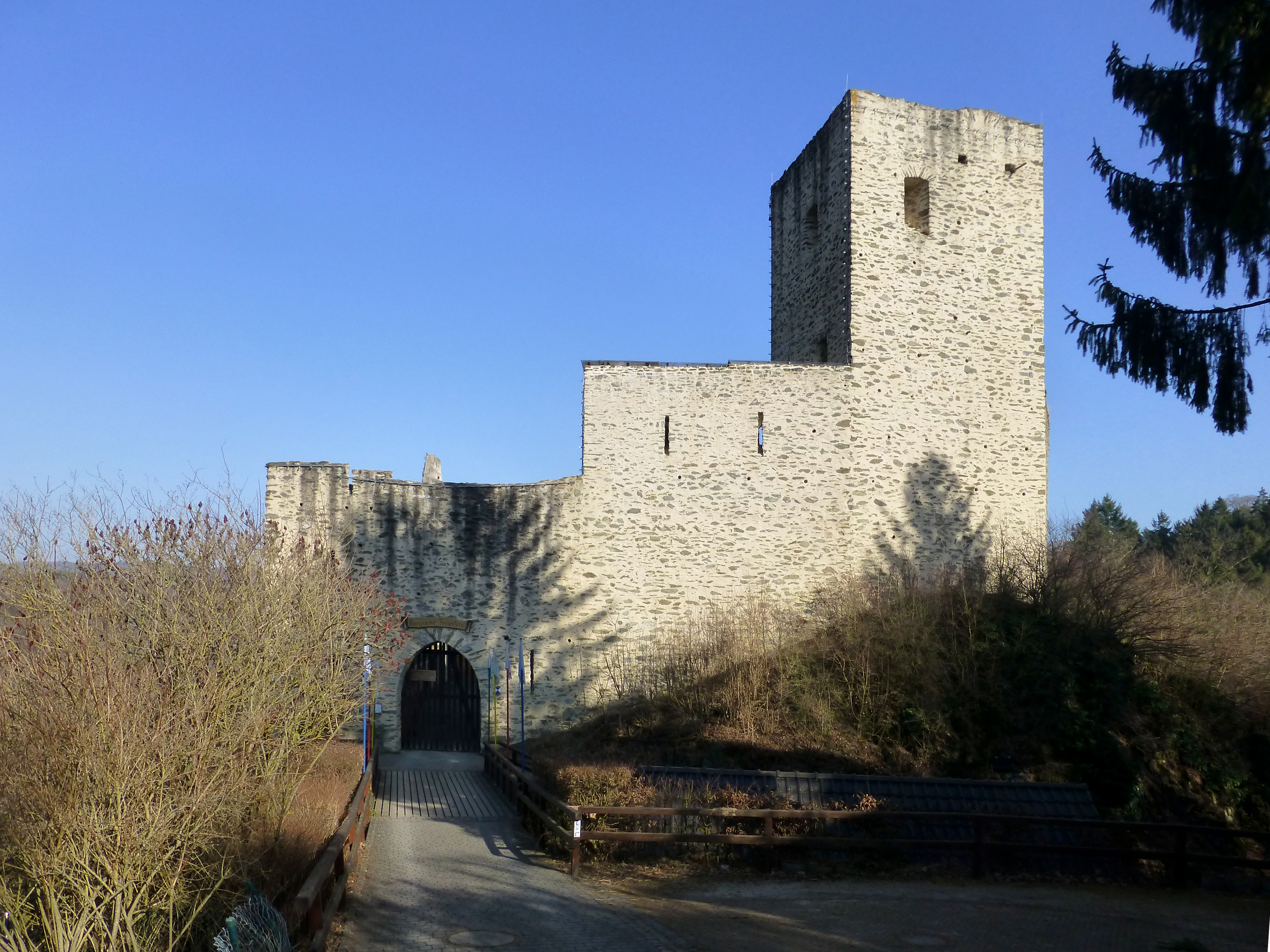
Freienfels

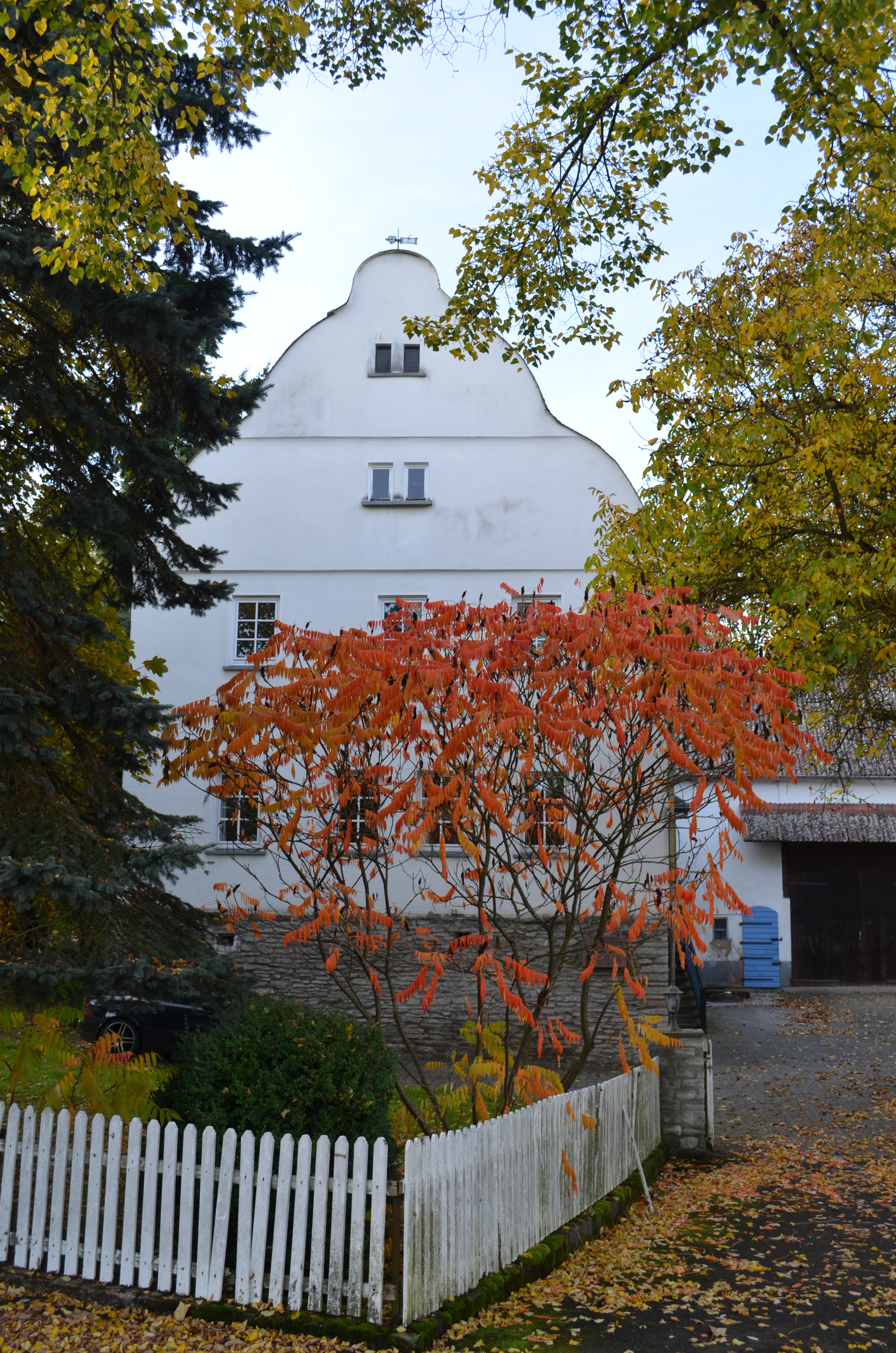
Eschbach

=== Later history ===
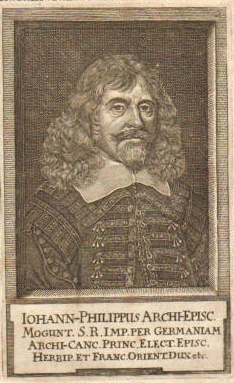
Archbishop Johann Philipp von Schönborn (1605–1673)

Johann Philipp von Schönborn of Eschbach, son of a minor nobleman in the employ of the then Lutheran counts of Wied, became a Catholic priest in the impoverished times of the Thirty Years' War. He was admitted as a minor canon by the cathedral chapter of Wurzburg. At the time, the Schönborn family consisted only of himself and his brother, a rather poor knight with limited estates. These two initially quite insignificant brothers brought the family to power and fame, and the new branches emanating from the non-celibate brother were to become widely known throughout Europe.

Johann Philipp became a priest at Wurzburg Cathedral at the age of 16, translated to Mainz Cathedral in 1625, and to Worms Cathedral in 1630. He became a provost and, in 1642, was elected prince-bishop of Wurzburg. His ruthless prosecution of the Counter Reformation eliminated Lutheranism from the territory he controlled. His diplomatic skills made him an important mediator during the negotiations that ended the Thirty Years' War in 1648. As a result, he was additionally elected Archbishop of Mainz in 1647, thus also ruler of the Electorate of Mainz and archchancellor of the Holy Roman empire. In 1663, he also received the princely-bishopric of Worms. He was an effective administrator of his principalities and was able to bring about economic recovery. He fortified the city of Mainz and founded hospitals and high schools. His court was a center of German politics in the post-war era. Johann Philipp was the first of six members of the Schönborn family who, in the course of more than three generations, were to rule over eight of the most prestigious ecclesiastical principalities of the Holy Roman Empire.

He made his brother Philip Erwein (1607–1668) a Vogt in the Electorate of Mainz where the latter acquired the castles of Gaibach in 1650, of Geisenheim in 1654 and of Heusenstamm (where he built a new castle) in 1661. In 1635, he married Maria Ursula von Greiffenclau-Vollraths, a close relative of the late archbishop and elector of Mainz Georg Friedrich von Greiffenklau; the couple had 12 children. In 1663, Philip Erwein became a baron. The family thus shifted its focus from its regions of origin, which had become predominantly Protestant, to the Catholic ecclesiastical principalities of the empire.

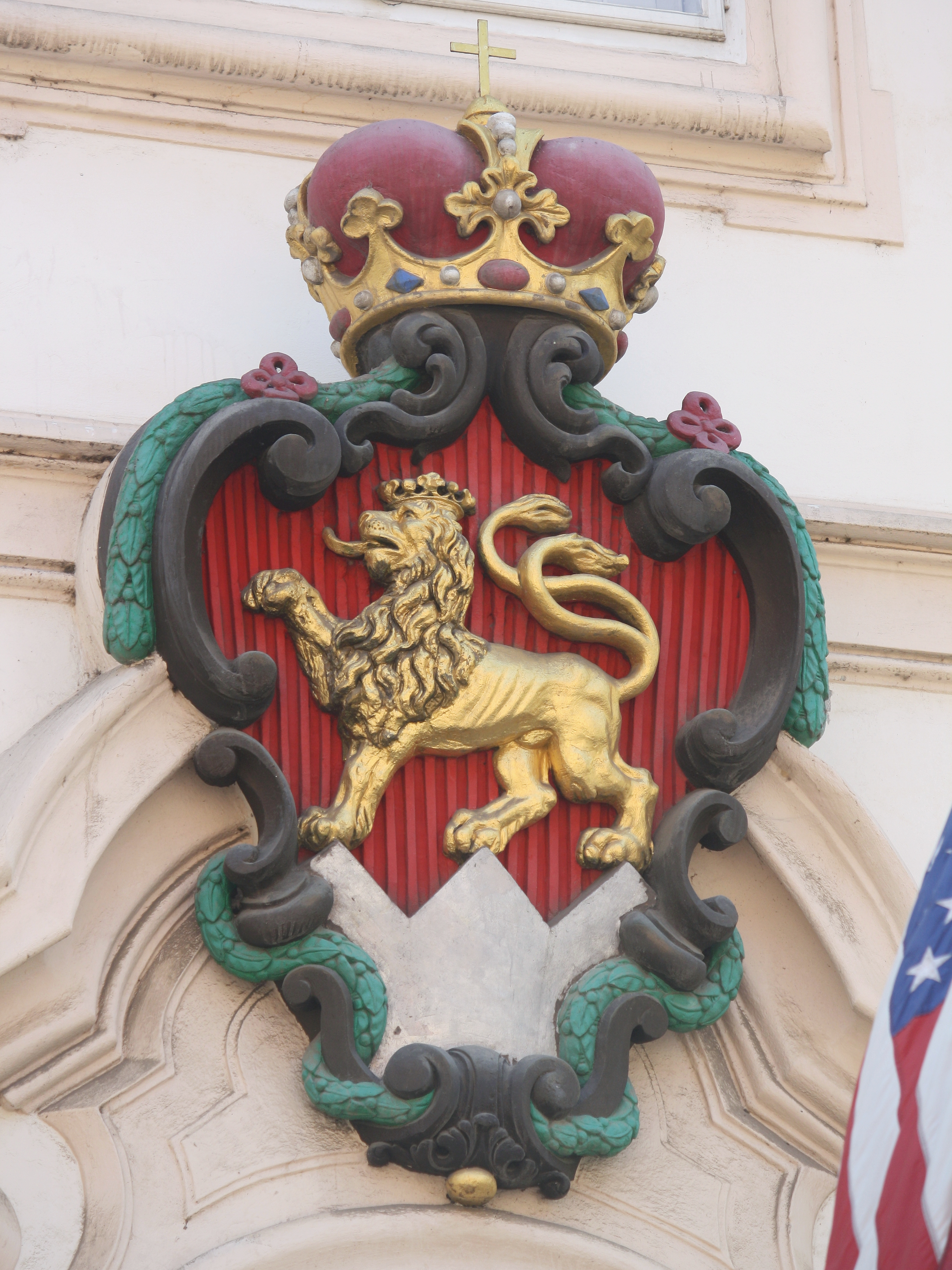
Arms of the Schönborn family at the Schönborn Palace in Prague

Philip Erwein's son, Lothar Franz von Schönborn, also became a prince-bishop of Wurzburg in 1693 and an elector-archbishop of Mainz in 1695. The latter's brother Melchior (1644–1717) acquired the fief of Reichelsburg (near Aub) from the prince-bishop of Wurzburg in 1671, giving him access to the Franconian Circle of the imperial knights.

In 1701, Melchior's son, Rudolf Franz (1677–1754), married Eleonore von Hatzfeld, widow of the Count von Dernbach, who had left her the Herrschaft Wiesentheid in Franconia, a small imperial state raised to a county in 1701. Thus, the family obtained imperial immediacy for the first time, and since the counts of Schönborn bear the prefix Illustrious Highness. She inherited the Austrian fiefs of Arnfels and Waldenstein in Carinthia from her first husband. Melchior then bought some further estates in Austria in 1710, Göllersdorf with Mühlberg and Aspersdorf in Lower Austria, from the Counts of Buchheim. In 1717, his estate was partitioned into the states of Schönborn-Wiesentheid and Schönborn-Heusenstamm, both retaining immediacy. Heusenstamm was inherited by Schönborn-Wiesentheid in 1801. The state of Schönborn-Wiesentheid was mediatised in 1806.

In 1726, Charles VI, Holy Roman Emperor, granted Palanok Castle with Mukacheve, Chynadiiovo and 200 villages in the Kingdom of Hungary (today part of Ukraine), to Elector Lothar Franz, after the latter had sent him troops to defeat Francis II Rákóczi, whose property it had been. The estate, one of the largest in Eastern Europe, remained in the family well into the 20th century.

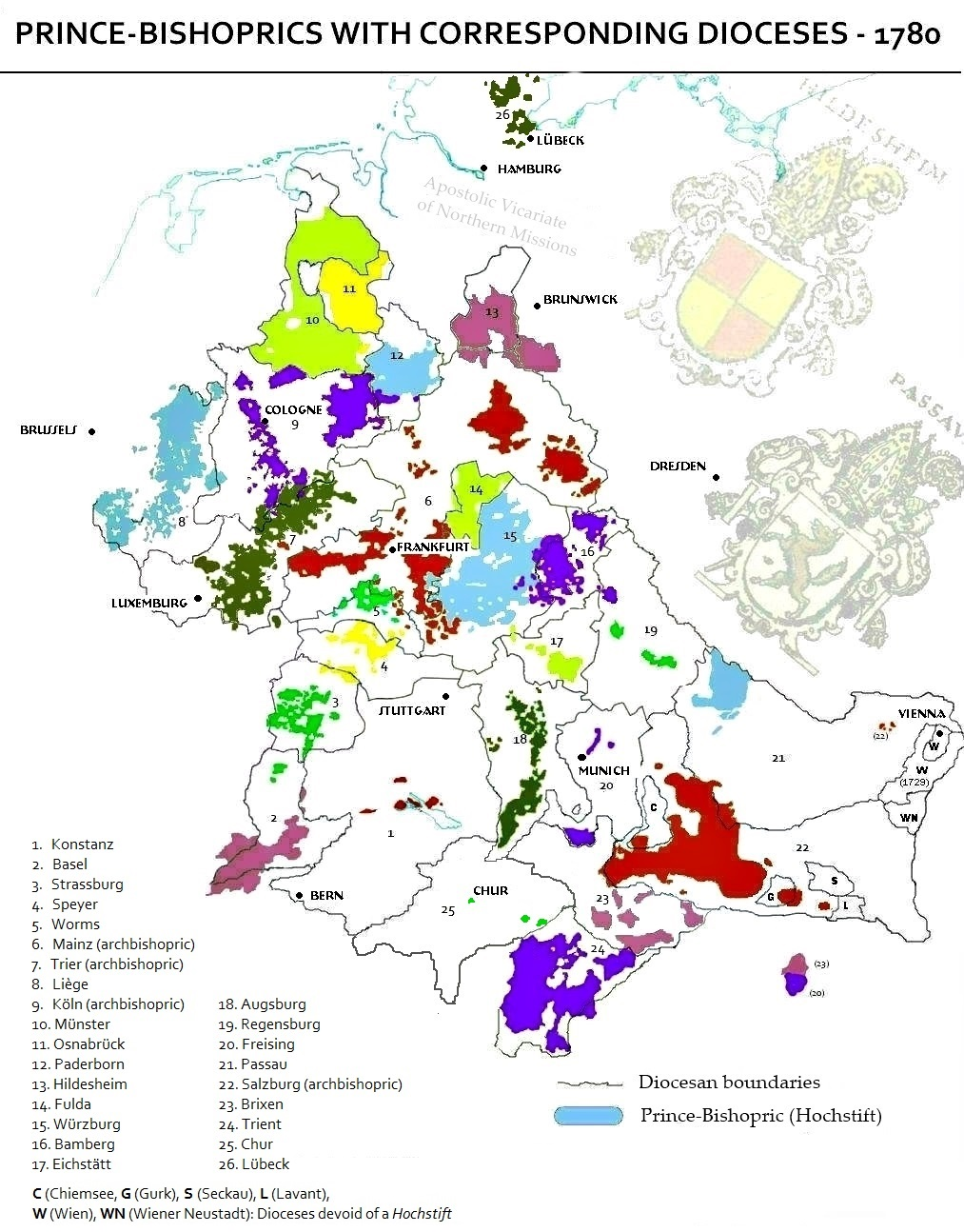
Ecclesiastical lands in the Holy Roman Empire, 1780

In 1743, members of the family ruled the following states, all sovereign princely-bishoprics within the Holy Roman Empire: Bamberg, Würzburg, Konstanz, Speyer, Worms and Trier, while the archdiocese and electorate of Mainz (and thus archchancellorship of Germany, a position that two Schönborns had held shortly before) were held by a close relative, Johann Friedrich Karl von Ostein. Not only were important parts of Southern Germany under their control, but also quite wealthy regions. The Schönborns were not restricted to ruling these territories. They followed through, over several generations, with one of the most ambitious building programs of the 18th century, including churches, monasteries, ecclesiastical residences, schools and hospitals. Again, in the 19th, 20th, and 21st centuries, two Schönborns rose to become archbishops and cardinals.

At the end of the 18th century, three brothers, who were great-grandsons of Rudolf Franz (1677–1754), established the three extant branches of the family:

- Franz Philipp (1768–1841) founded the Austrian branch, Schönborn-Buchheim, until today owning the Göllersdorf and Weyerburg estates and Palais Schönborn-Batthyány in Vienna;
- Franz Erwein (1776–1840) founded the Franconian branch (in Bavaria), Schönborn-Wiesentheid, until today owning the castles at Wiesentheid, Pommersfelden, Gaibach, Geisenheim and the wine estates Hallburg near Volkach and Hattenheim, and formerly also owning property in Bohemia; and
- Friedrich (1781–1849) founded the Bohemian branch, Schönborn, residing at Schönborn Palace (Prague), today the U.S. embassy, and until 1945 at Skalka Castle, Czech Republic.

The Schönborns were able to remain influential for long periods by repeatedly holding high church offices. This was not common among German noble families; other exceptions being the Walderdorff and the Eltz, who also became influential through church careers. These did not belong by birth to the great ruling houses of the Holy Roman Empire, but possessed only two insignificant counties with semi-sovereign status, which could not in the least justify their rise. Nor did they ever achieve the desired hereditary princely rank, but as a family always remained Imperial Counts. Only their elected prelates rose to the rank of prince. The jealousy of the other imperial princes regarding the power of the Schönborn family in the ecclesiastical territories as well as their contempt for their modest knightly origins and their small hereditary lands may also have played a role in preventing their elevation to the hereditary princely status when this was considered at the imperial court in 1717.

Since in the imperial church system of the Holy Roman Empire, episcopal dignities were awarded through elections of the cathedral chapter and not through papal selection – a tradition continued to this day by the Reich Concordat of 1933 – this sustained political ascent required suitable candidates across generations as well as a well-maintained political and ecclesiastical network. While the famous papal families, after a one-time success in the conclave, had almost unlimited access to power and wealth for a limited time, the German prince-bishops had to maneuver in the confusing tangle of powers, between the Holy Roman Emperor, the prince-electors, the ruling princes and prince-bishops, the nobility of the ecclesiastical territories, who filled the elective cathedral chapters, as well as the Roman Curia and foreign powers. The Schönborns maneuvered through this complicated, multi-leveled system with considerable success over several generations. The episcopal careers of the Schönborns were systematically flanked by advantageous marriages of lay members of the family, which led to significant acquisitions of property. The building projects the family constructed combined their landowning strategy with their cultural endeavours (see below, Baroque architecture), demonstrating their social and aesthetic cognisance, as well as persistent ambition, over long periods of time.

At the end of the 19th Century, the family owned 226,800 hectares of land.

== Rulers of Schönborn ==
=== Lords of Schönborn (1385–1663) ===
- Gerard (1385–1416)
- Gerard (1416–1460)
- John II (1460–1490)
- John IV (1490–1529)
- George II (1529–1560)
- Philip (1560–1589)
- George IV (1589–1613)
- Philipp Erwein (1613–1668), since 1663 Baron

=== Barons of Schönborn (1663–1701) ===
- Philipp Erwein (1663–1668)
- Johann Erwein (1668–1705), since 1701 Count, jointly with:

=== Counts of Schönborn (1701–1717) ===
- Johann Erwein (1701–1705)
- Melchior Friedrich (1705–1717)

Divided between the lines Heusenstamm and Wiesentheid.

=== After German Mediatisation ===
- Hugo Damian, Count 1772–1817 (1739–1817)
  - Franz Philipp, Count of Schönborn-Buchheim (1768–1841)
    - Schönborn-Buchheim Line
  - Franz Erwein, Count of Schönborn-Wiesentheid (1776–1840)
    - Schönborn-Wiesentheid Line
  - Friedrich, Count 1817–1849 (1781–1849) Bohemian Line
    - Erwein, Count 1849–1881 (1812–1881)
      - Karl, Count 1881–1908 (1840–1908)
        - Johann, Count 1908–1912 (1864–1912)
          - Karl Johann, Count 1912–1952 (1890–1952)
            - Hugo-Damian, Count 1952–1979 (1916–1979)
              - Philipp, Count 1979–present (born 1943)
              - Count Christoph, Archbishop of Vienna and cardinal (born 1945)
              - Count Michael (born 1954)
          - Count Heinrich (1910–1991)
            - Count Alexander (born 1938)
              - Count Damian (born 1987)
        - Count Zdenko (1879–1960)
          - Count Zdenko (1917–1993) – male heirs exist
      - Franziskus von Paula (1844–1899) was a Czech Catholic bishop of České Budějovice and later archbishop of Prague and cardinal.

== Counts of Schönborn-Buchheim ==
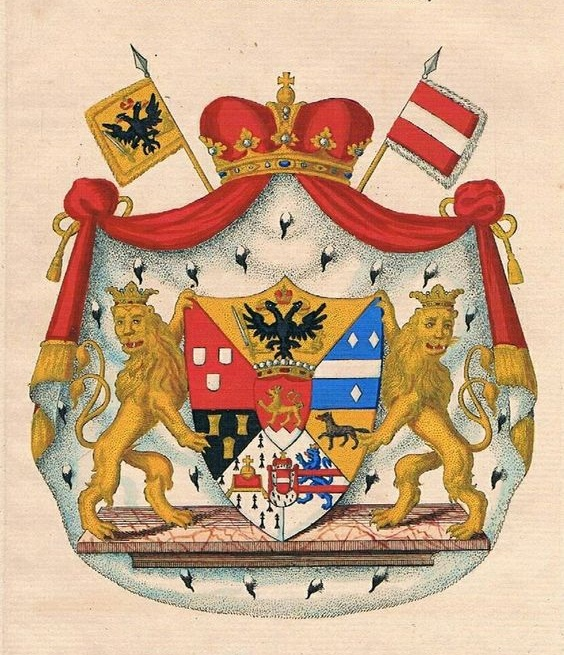
The coat of arms of the Counts of Schönborn-Buchheim, Lords of Munkacs

=== After German Mediatisation ===
- Franz Philipp, 1st Count 1817–1841 (1768–1841)
  - Erwein, 2nd Count 1841–1844 (1791–1864) – resigned rights to his brother in 1844
  - Karl, 3rd Count 1844–1854 (1803–1854)
    - Erwein, 4th Count 1854–1903 (1842–1903)
      - Friedrich Karl, 5th Count 1903–1932 (1869–1932)
        - Georg 6th Count 1932–1989 (1906–1989)
          - Friedrich Karl, 7th Count 1989–present (born 1938) ∞ Isabelle d'Orleans, Princess of France
            - Damian, Hereditary Count of Schönborn-Buchheim (born 1965)
            - Count Vinzenz (born 1966)
              - Count Philipp (born 2003)
              - Count Clemens (born 2005)
              - Count Alexander (born 2010)
            - Count Melchior (born 1977)
              - Count Theodor (born 2015)

== Counts of Schönborn-Heusenstamm (1717–1801) ==
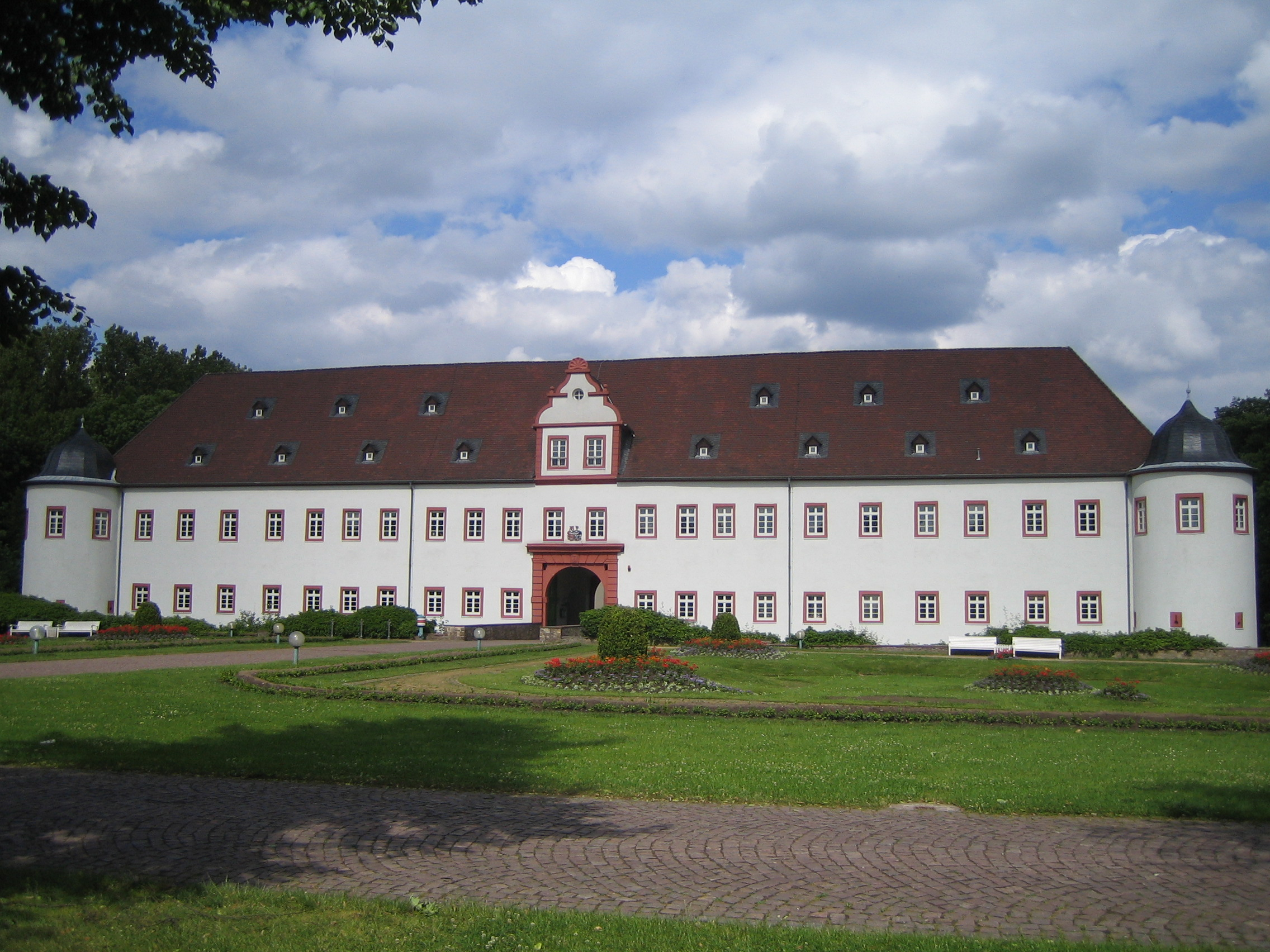
Heusenstamm Castle, built in 1661 for Philipp Erwein von Schönborn

Schönborn-Heusenstamm was a German statelet that was ruled by the Schönborn family and located in the south of modern-day Hesse, Germany. Schönborn-Heusenstamm was a partition of Schönborn, and it was inherited by Schönborn-Wiesentheid in 1801.

- Anselm Franz (1717–1726)
- Eugen Erwein the Posthumous (1727–1801)

== Counts of Schönborn-Wiesentheid (1717–1806) ==
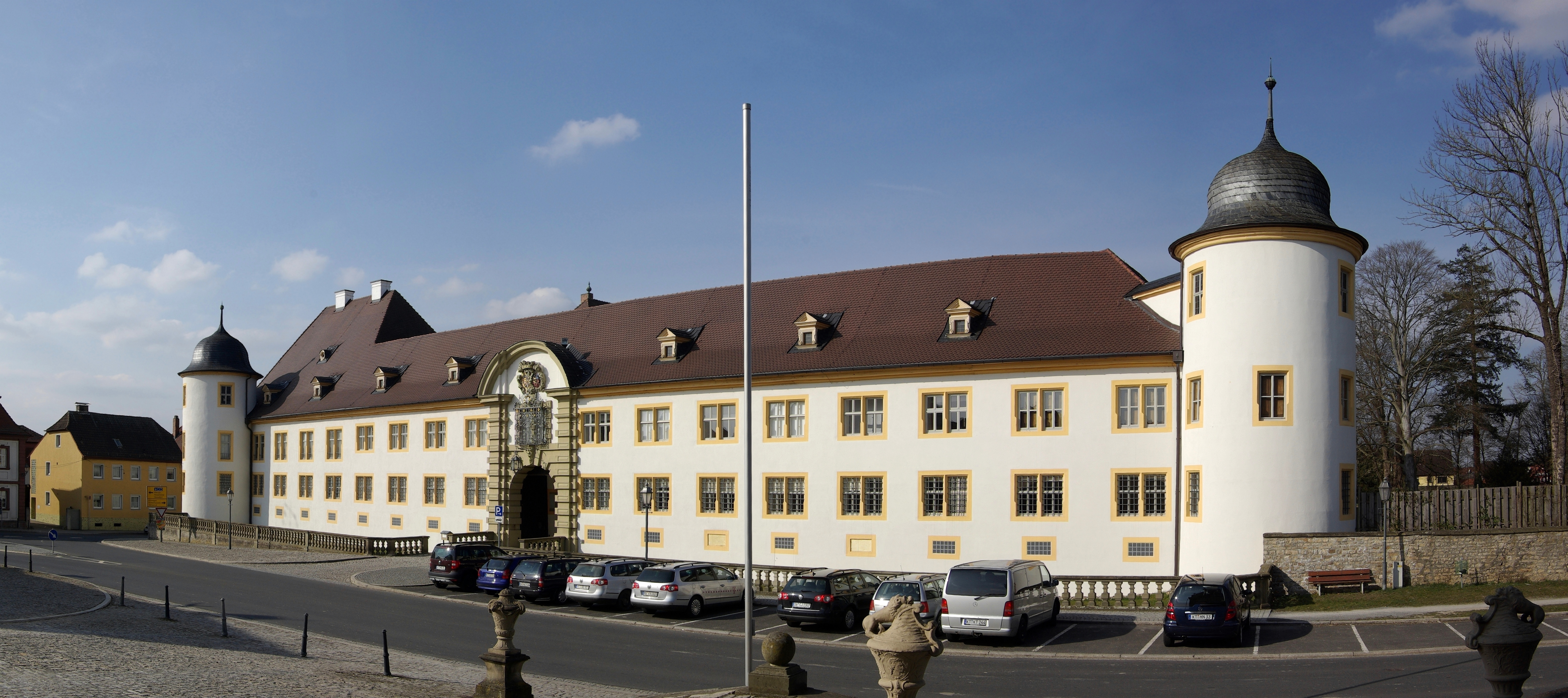
Wiesentheid Castle, built in 1701 for Rudolf Franz Erwein von Schönborn, to this day the main residence of the line of the same name.

Schönborn-Wiesentheid was a county in Lower Franconia, the northwestern region of modern-day Bavaria, Germany. It comprised various isolated districts spanning from the Regnitz River to the Main River east of Würzburg. Schönborn-Wiesentheid was a partition of Schönborn, and it inherited the territory of Schönborn-Heusenstamm in 1801. Schönborn-Wiesentheid was mediatised to Bavaria in 1806.

- Rudolf Franz Erwein (1717–1754)
- Joseph Francis Bonaventura (1754–1772)
- Hugo Damian Erwein (1772–1806)

=== After German Mediatisation ===
- Franz Erwein, 1st Count 1817–1840 (1776–1840)
  - Hugo, 2nd Count 1840–1865 (1805–1865)
  - Klemens, 3rd Count 1865–1877 (1810–1877)
    - Arthur, 4th Count 1877–1915 (1846–1915)
      - Erwein, 5th Count 1915–1942 (1877–1942)
        - Karl, 6th Count 1942–1998 (1916–1998)
          - Filipp, 7th Count 1998–2004 (born 1954) – renounced his title in 2004
          - Paul, 8th Count 1998–present (born 1964)
            - Franz, Hereditary Count of Schönborn-Wiesentheid (born 1990)
            - Count Alexander (born 1991)
            - Count Johannes (born 1991)
            - Count Georg (born 1995)
            - Count Michael (born 1997)

== Prelates of the family ==
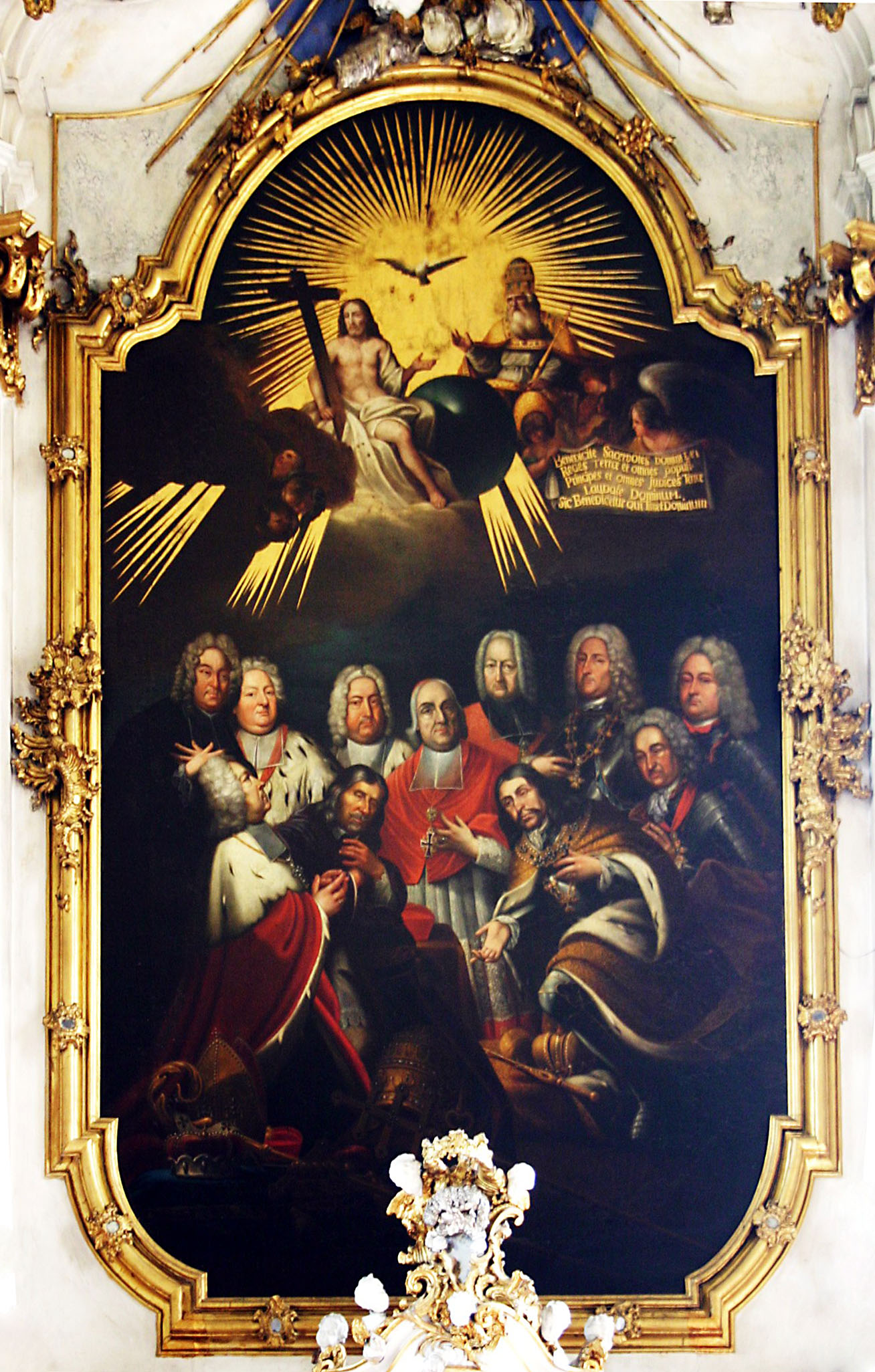
Altarpiece of 1745 at Gaibach Church: Three generations of the Schönborn family

This family counts several prelates of the Catholic Church:

- Johann Philipp von Schönborn (1605–1673), Prince-elector and Archbishop of Mainz, Bishop of Würzburg and Worms. His contemporaries gave him the honourable titles of "the Wise", "the German Solomon", and "the Cato of Germany".
- Lothar Franz von Schönborn, nephew of the above, was Prince-elector and Archbishop of Mainz (1695–1729) and Bishop of Bamberg (1693).
- Damian Hugo Philipp von Schönborn, Prince-Bishop of Speyer (1719–1743) and of Konstanz (1740), and was also a cardinal. He did much for the Diocese of Speyer, and was conspicuous for his culture, learning, and piety.
- Franz Georg von Schönborn, Prince-elector and Archbishop of Trier (1729–1756) and Bishop of Worms (1732). Both Frederick the Great and Maria Theresa praised him as an excellent ruler.
- Johann Philipp Franz von Schönborn, Bishop of Würzburg (1719–1724).
- Friedrich Karl von Schönborn (3 March 1674 – 26 July 1746) was Bishop of Bamberg and Würzburg (1729–1746). He was born at Mainz. He spent most of his time at the Imperial court in Vienna, serving as Vice-Chancellor of the Holy Roman Empire from 1705 to 1734. The last three prelates were brothers, and nephews of Lothar Franz.
- Franziskus von Paula Graf von Schönborn. (24 January 1844 – 6 June 1899). Born in Prague, he became Archbishop of Prague in 1885, and was created cardinal in 1889.
- Christoph Cardinal Schönborn (born 1945) is the current Archbishop Emeritus of Vienna.
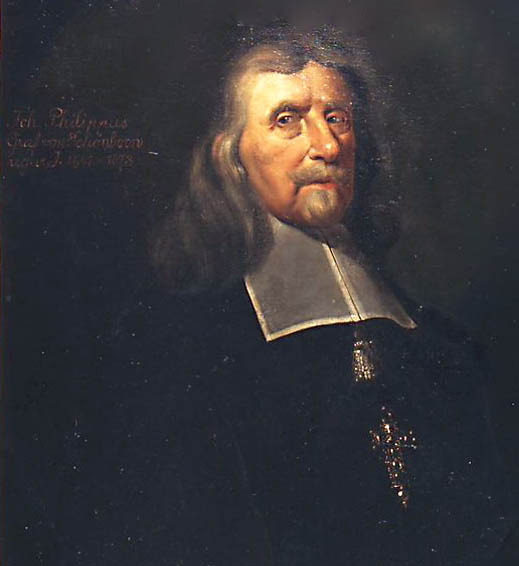
Johann Philipp von Schönborn (1605–1673), Prince-elector and Archbishop of Mainz, Bishop of Würzburg and Worms

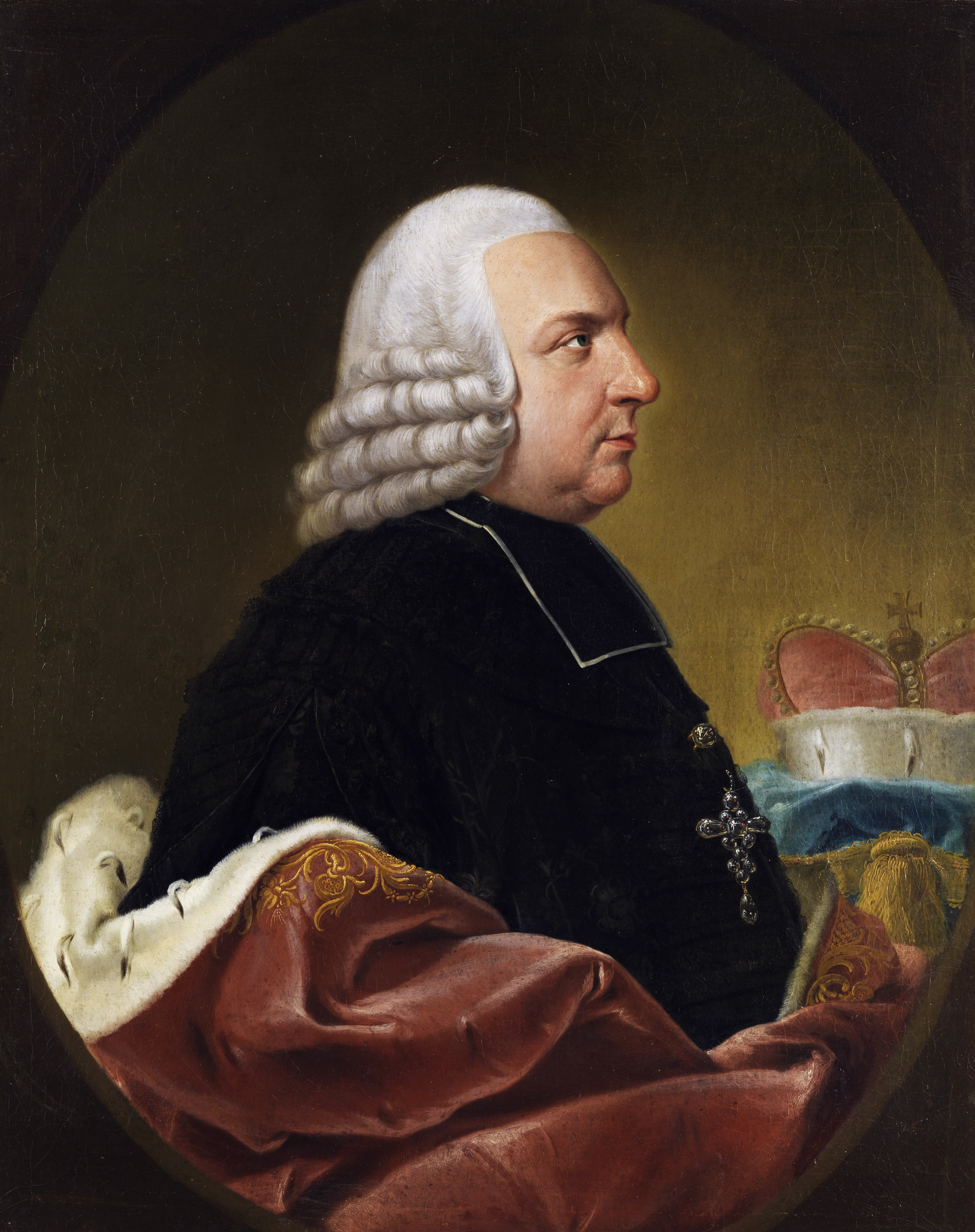
Lothar Franz von Schönborn (1655–1729), Prince-elector and Archbishop of Mainz (1695–1729) and Bishop of Bamberg (1693)

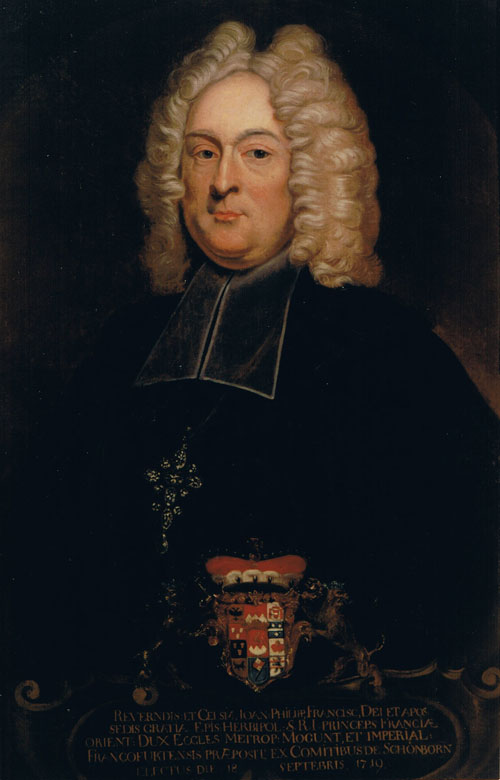
Johann Philipp Franz von Schönborn (1673–1724), Bishop of Würzburg (1719–1724)

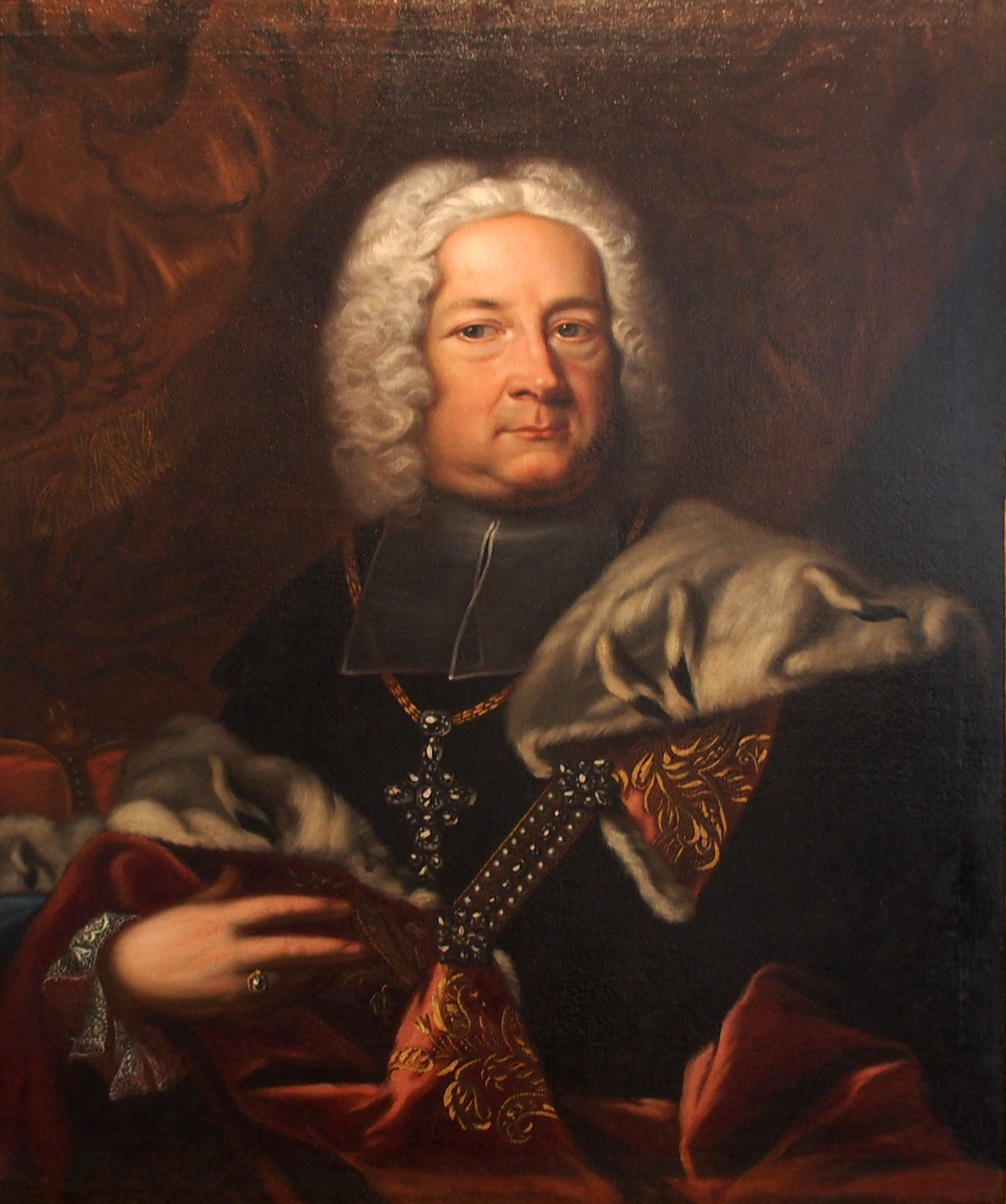
Friedrich Karl von Schönborn (1674–1746), Bishop of Bamberg and Würzburg (1729–1746), Vice Chancellor of the Holy Roman Empire

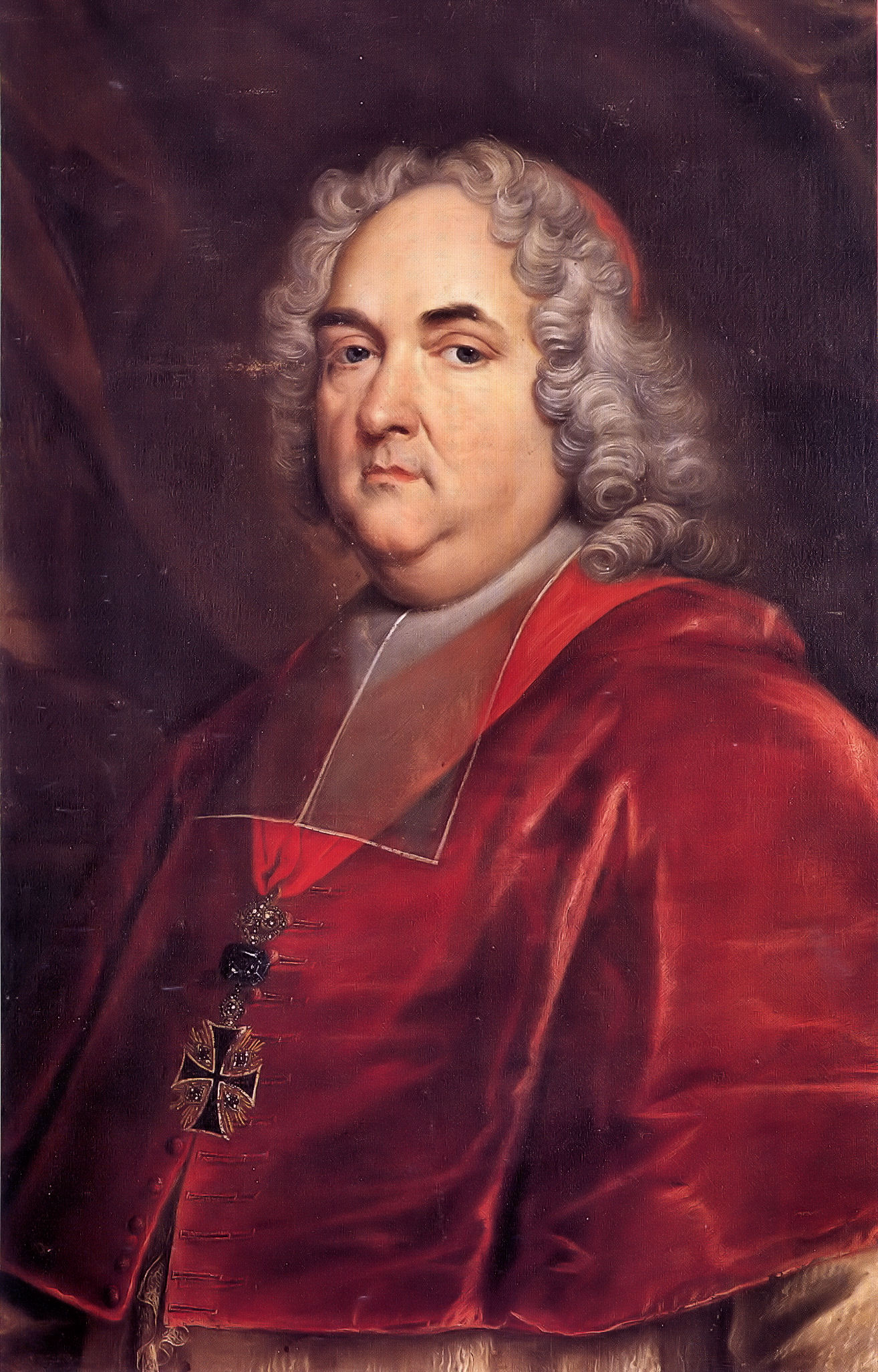
Cardinal Damian Hugo Philipp von Schönborn, Prince-Bishop of Speyer (1719–1743) and of Konstanz (1740)

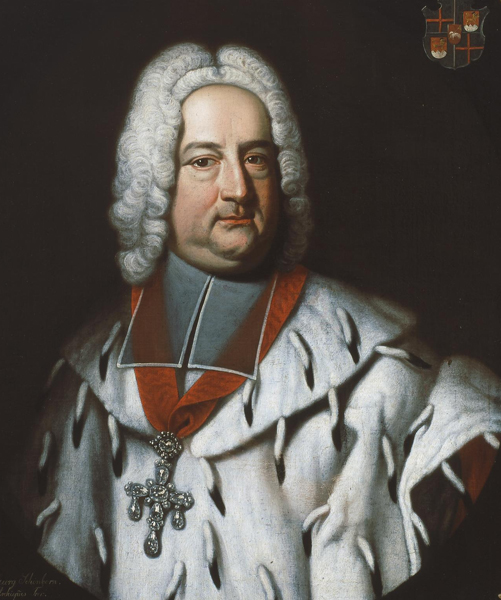
Franz Georg von Schönborn, Prince-elector and Archbishop of Trier (1729–1756) and Bishop of Worms (1732), Prince-provost of Ellwangen

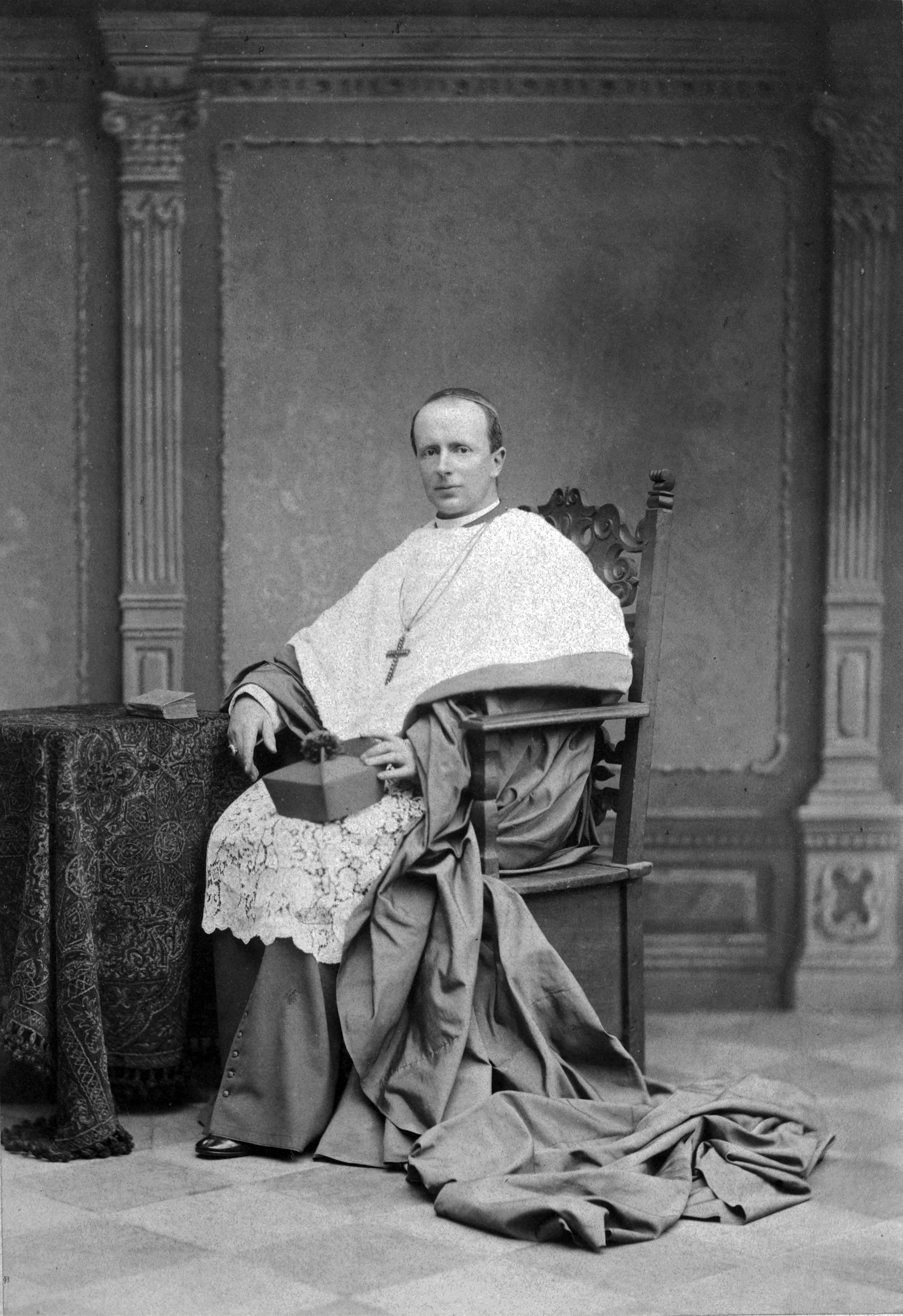
Cardinal Franziskus von Paula Graf von Schönborn (1844–1899), Archbishop of Prague (1885)

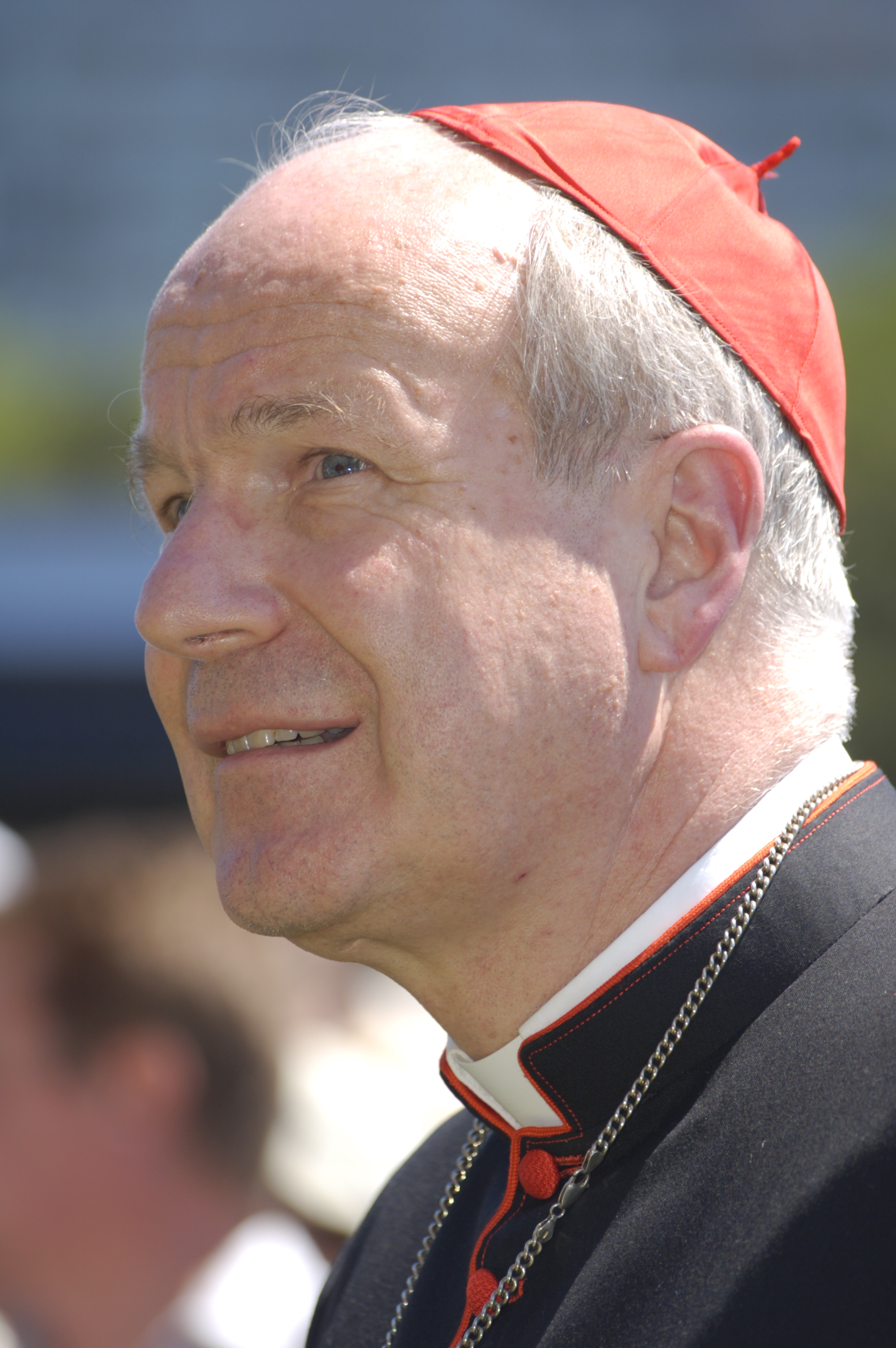
Christoph Cardinal Schönborn (born 1945), Archbishop of Vienna

== Baroque architecture ==
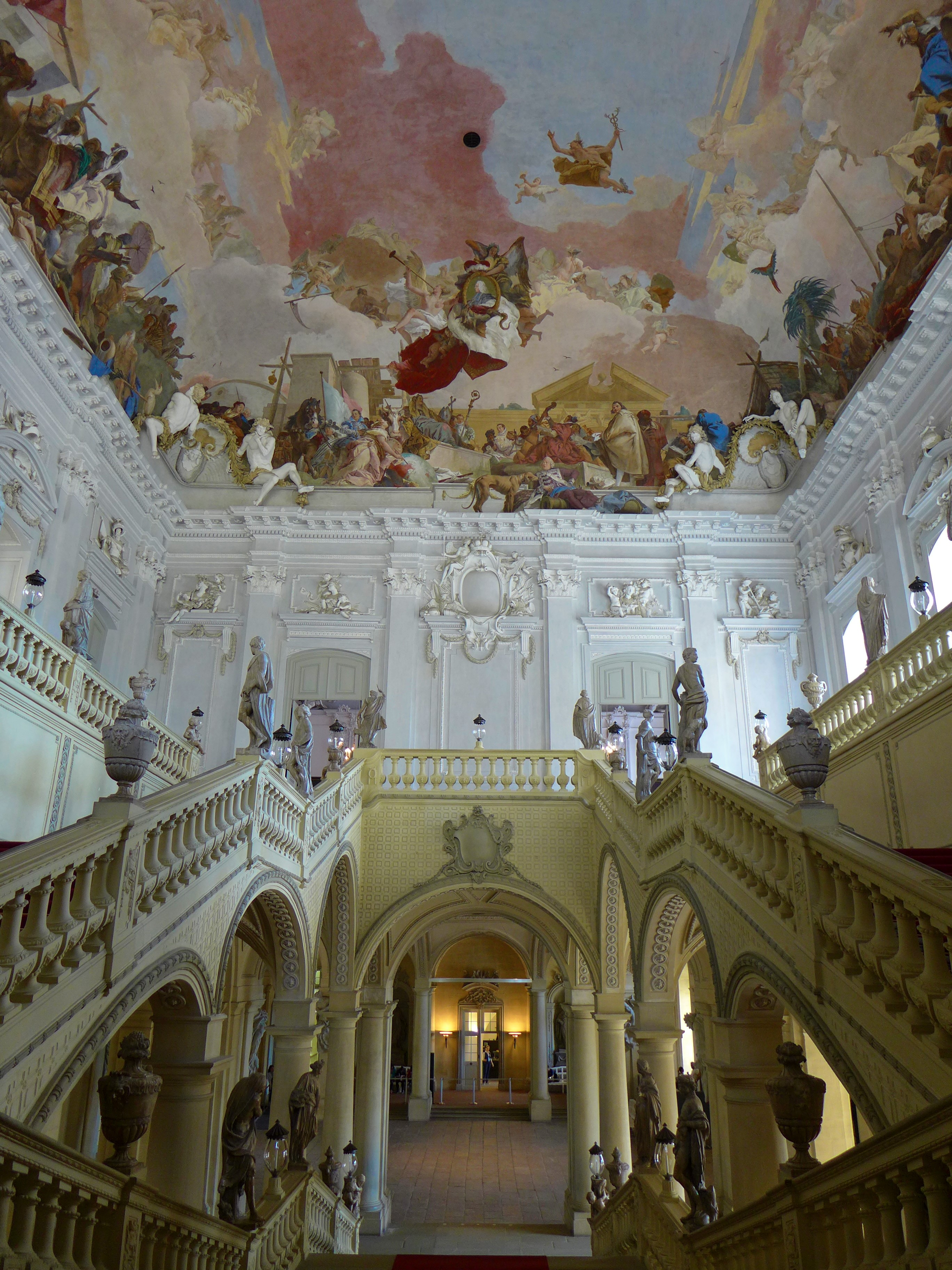
Neumann's staircase of the Würzburg Residence is considered a highlight of southern German Baroque.

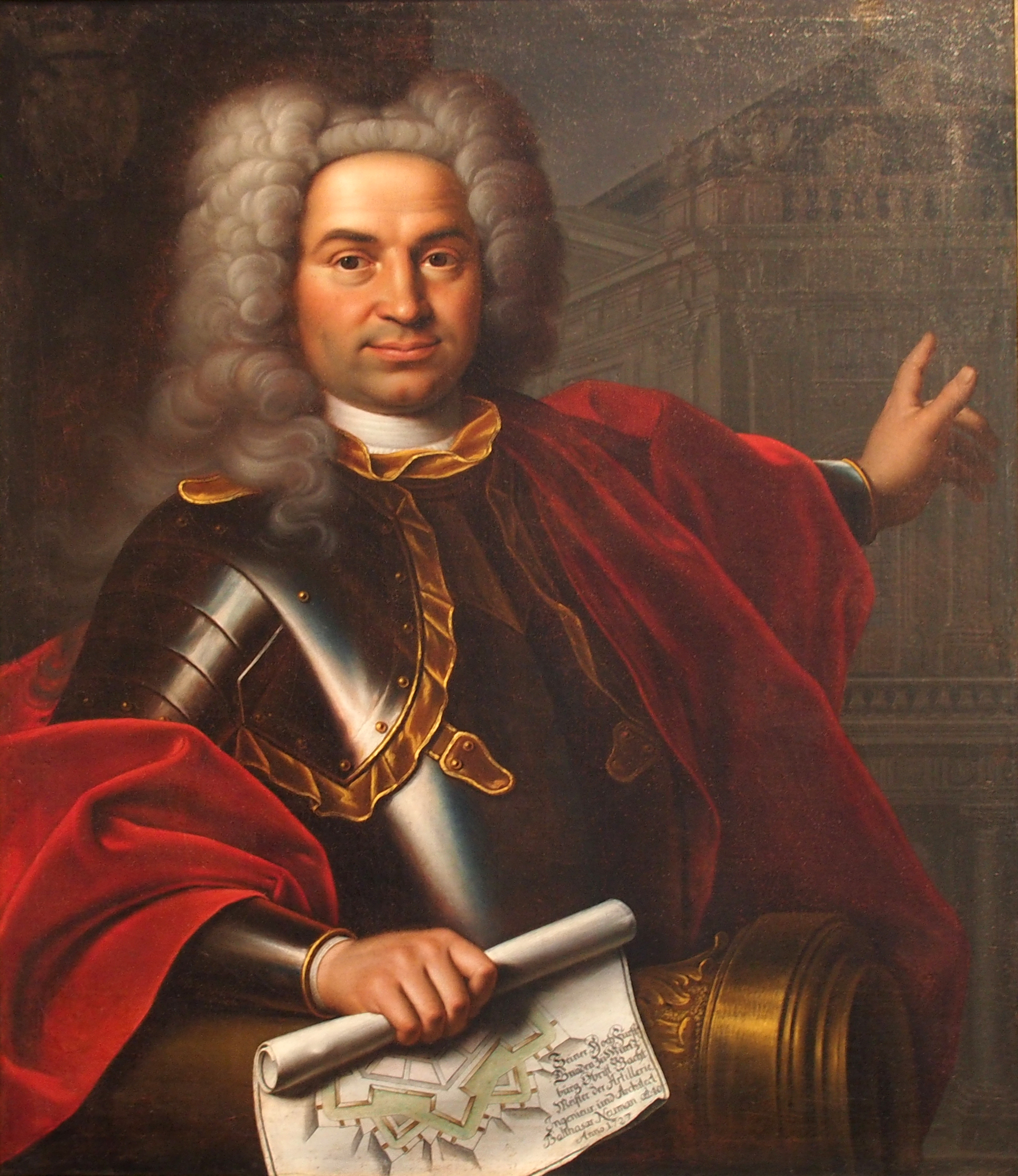
Balthasar Neumann (1687–1753), architect to 4 Schönborn bishops

The House of Schönborn, especially its ruling prelates of the Catholic Church, were among the most important builders of Southern German baroque architecture. While the private estates, at a large part still today owned by the family, were of more modest size, sometimes of elder origin, churches, monasteries, ecclesiastical residences and hospitals built by the Schönborn bishops were of immense grandness and splendor. Financing these was only possible with flourishing economies, which the Schönborn bishops did their best to uphold and enhance. Court architect Balthasar Neumann was responsible for many of these buildings, others were Johann Dientzenhofer, Maximilian von Welsch and Johann Lukas von Hildebrandt. The family gave the name Schönbornzeit (Age of the Schönborns) to an era (1642–1756) which spanned more than a century and is sometimes nostalgically remembered in the popular consciousness as an era of marked prosperity. Today, the term Schönbornzeit denotes a particular style of Rhenish and Franconian baroque.

The ecclesiastical residences were owned by the church, and continued to be inhabited by successive bishops, while the private estates remained inheritance of the family. They were mostly acquired by the ruling prelates' brothers through marriage or from the income of the high lay offices entrusted to them in the states of their brothers. Of the grand bishops' palaces, only Weissenstein Palace at Pommersfelden continues to be privately owned by the family, as it was built, from 1711, with an initial amount of 100.000 guilders which were personally granted to elector Lothar Franz by Charles VI, Holy Roman Emperor, in reward of his services and his continuous political support. It contains the largest private baroque art collection in Germany, including paintings by Breughel, van Dyck, Rubens, and Titian, among others. Large collections of furniture, glass, and porcelain are also preserved.

=== Private residences ===
- Burg Schönborn (built around 1100)
- Burgschwalbach castle (a fief of the County of Katzenelnbogen, administrated in the Middle Ages by the Lords of Schönborn)
- Freienfels castle near Weinbach, 1466–1687 owned by the family
- Schloss Gaibach (near Volkach), since 1650 to this day owned by the Counts of Schönborn-Wiesentheid
- Schloss Geisenheim, since 1652 to this day owned by the Counts of Schönborn-Wiesentheid
- Heusenstamm Castle (built from 1661)
- Schönborner Hof in Mainz (built from 1668)
- Schönborner Hof in Aschaffenburg (built from 1673)
- Wiesentheid Castle, from 1701 to this day owned by the Counts of Schönborn-Wiesentheid and serving as their private residence

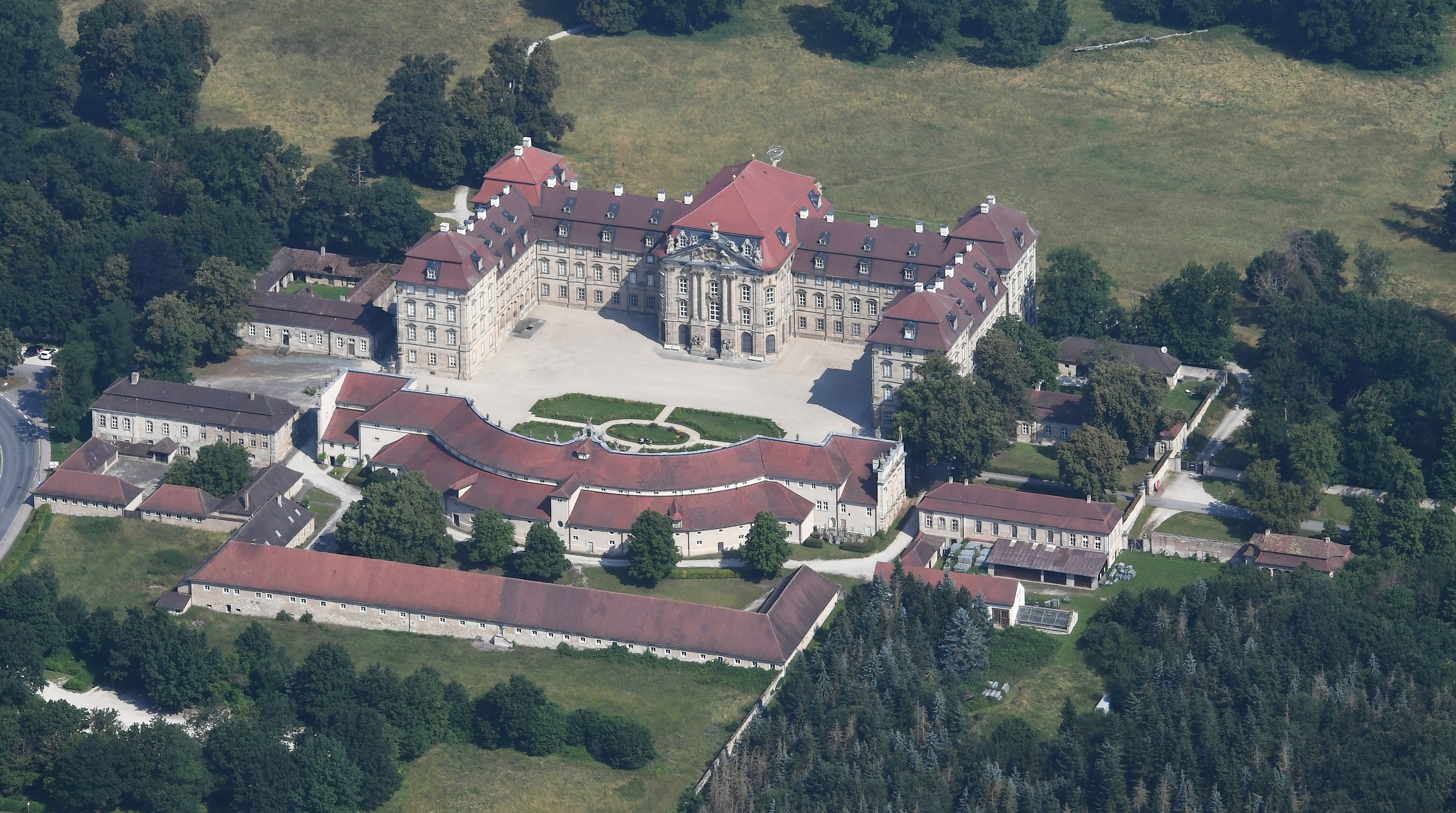
Weissenstein Palace in Bavaria, still owned by the Wiesentheid branch

- Weissenstein Palace at Pommersfelden (built from 1711 to 1718 for Lothar Franz von Schönborn), still owned by the Counts of Schönborn-Wiesentheid. The palace, which is open to the public, contains the largest private Baroque art collection in Germany, containing over 600 pictures. Baroque and Renaissance artists represented include Peter Paul Rubens, Albrecht Dürer, Titian, Rembrandt, Anthony van Dyck and Artemisia Gentileschi. It also houses a collection of 17th–19th century musical manuscripts and prints, the "Musical Collection of the Counts Schönborn-Wiesentheid", mainly acquired by Count Rudolf Franz Erwein von Schönborn (1677–1754), a talented amateur cellist who had ordered original cello compositions from various composers including Platti and Vivaldi. This is called the "elder repertoire" and consists of 147 prints and 497 mss. Its contents are listed with RISM. The "younger repertoire" was acquired by the cellist's grandson Hugo Damian Erwein (1738–1817) and great-grandson Franz Erwein von Schönborn (1774–1840). It consists of 141 prints and 98 mss. The whole library has been microfilmed.

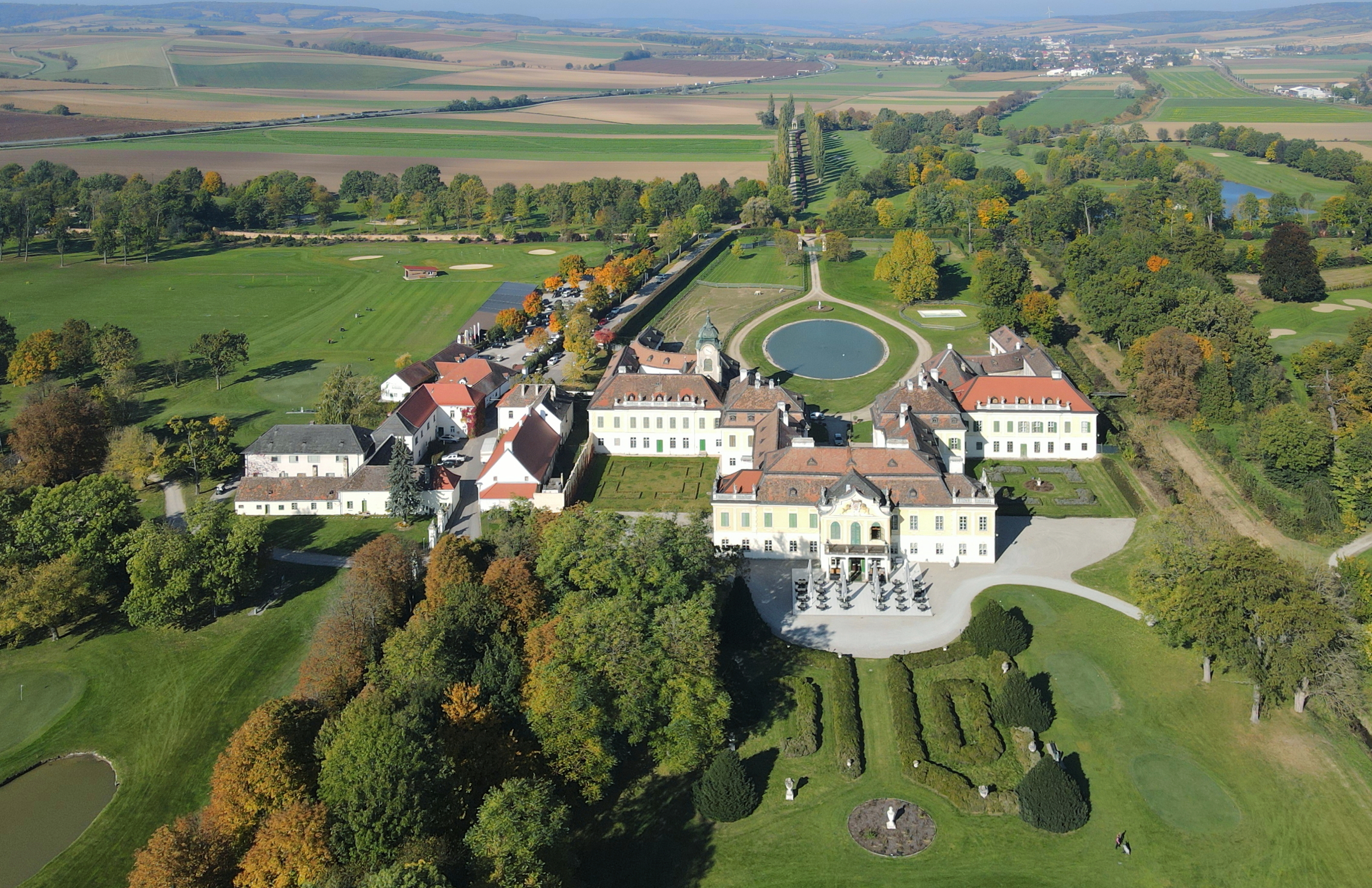
Schloss Schönborn in Austria, still the seat of the Buchheim branch

- Schloss Schönborn in Göllersdorf, Austria (since 1710 owned by the Counts of Schönborn-Buchheim)
- Weyerburg Castle, Austria (since 1714 owned by the Counts of Schönborn-Buchheim)
- Palais Schönborn-Batthyány, Vienna (since 1740 owned by the Counts of Schönborn-Buchheim)
- Palais Schönborn, Laudongasse, Vienna
- Schönborn Palace (Prague), sold by the Bohemian branch in 1919, since then the embassy of the United States
- Skalka Castle near Vlastislav (Litoměřice District), Czech Republic, owned by the Bohemian branch until expropriation by the state in 1946 (place of birth of Christoph Cardinal Schönborn)
- Chynadiiovo Castle, Ukraine
- Schönborn palace (Beregvar), near Chynadiiovo, Ukraine

=== Images of some private residences ===
(* means still family owned)

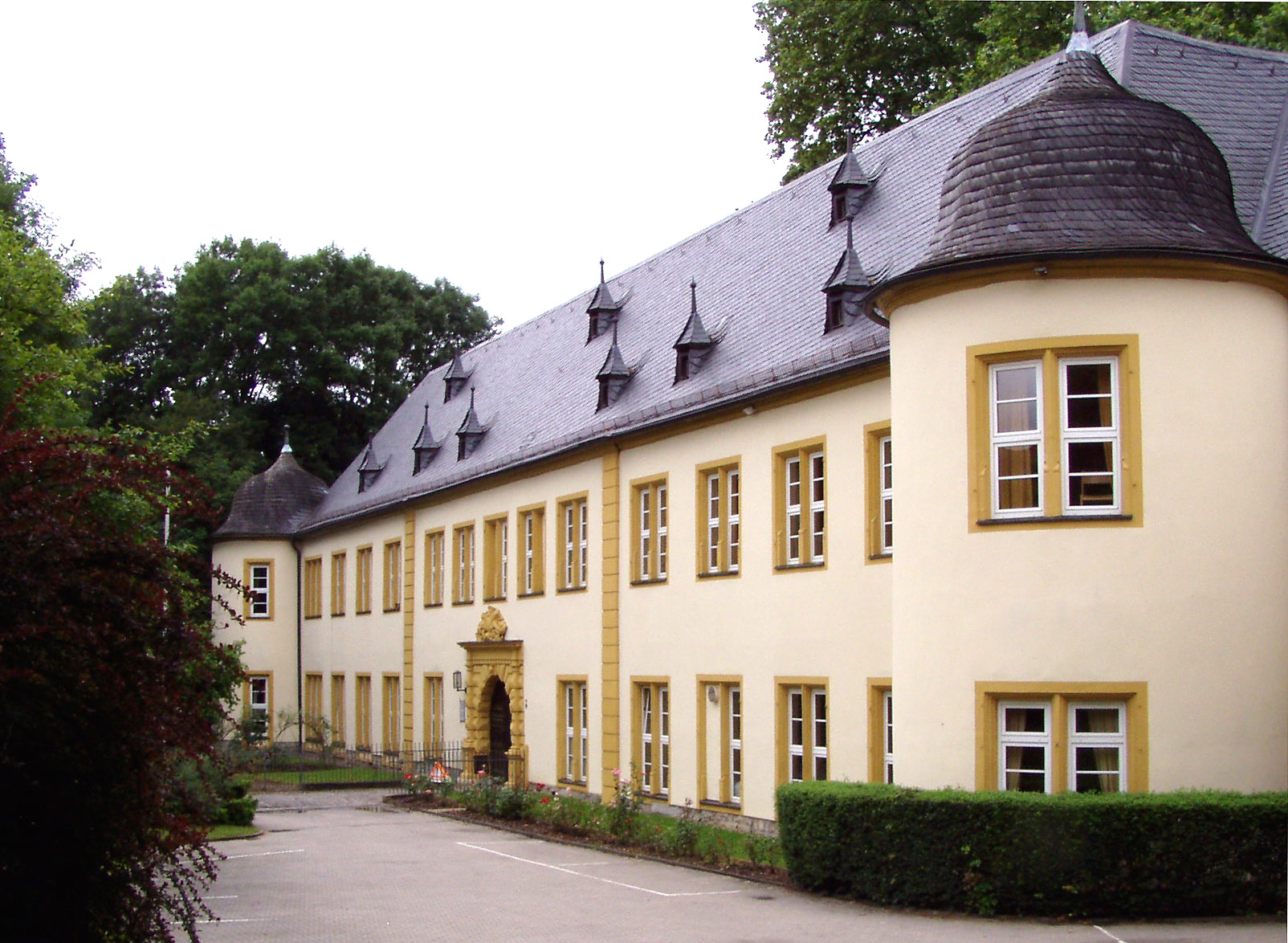
Gaibach castle*

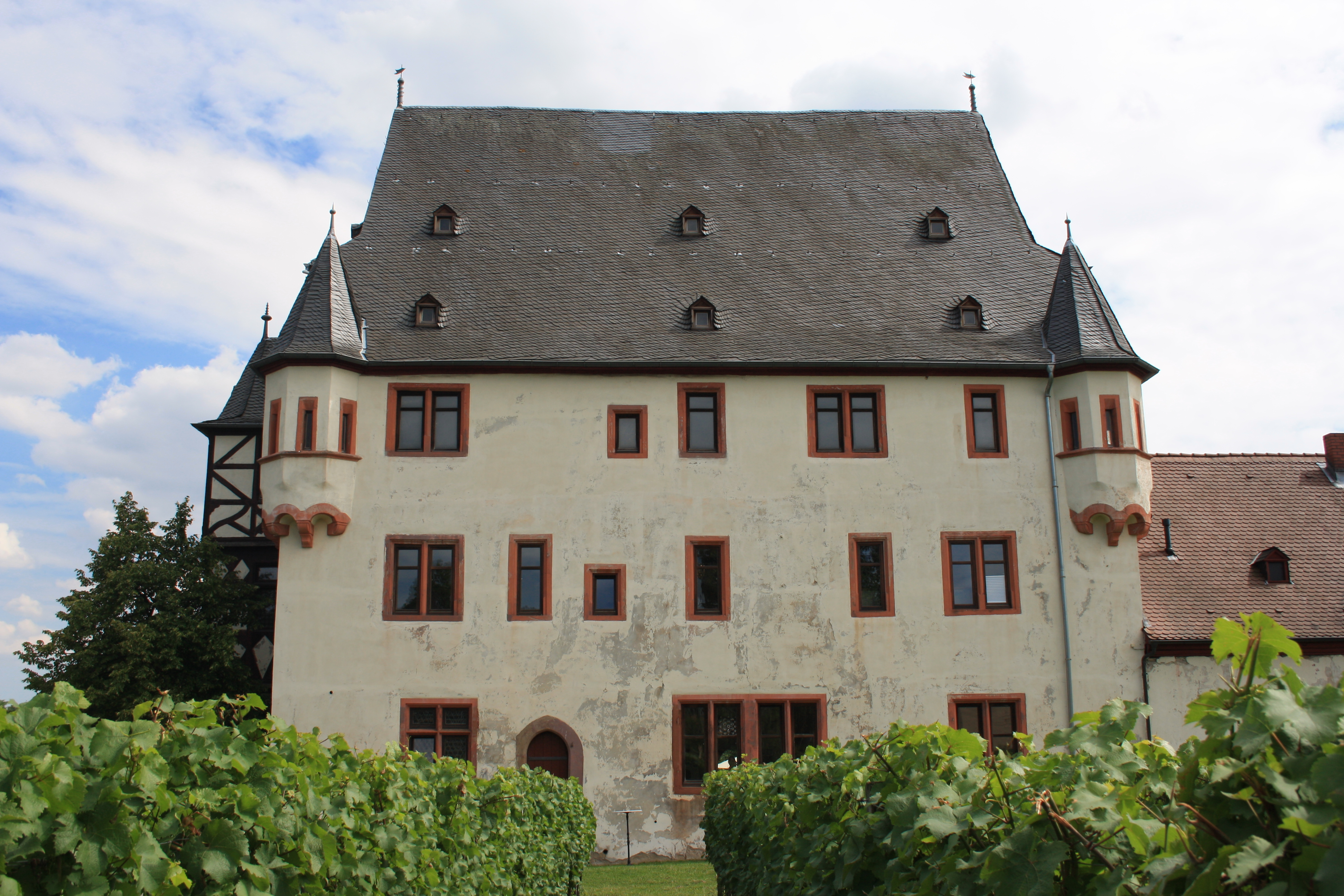
Geisenheim castle*

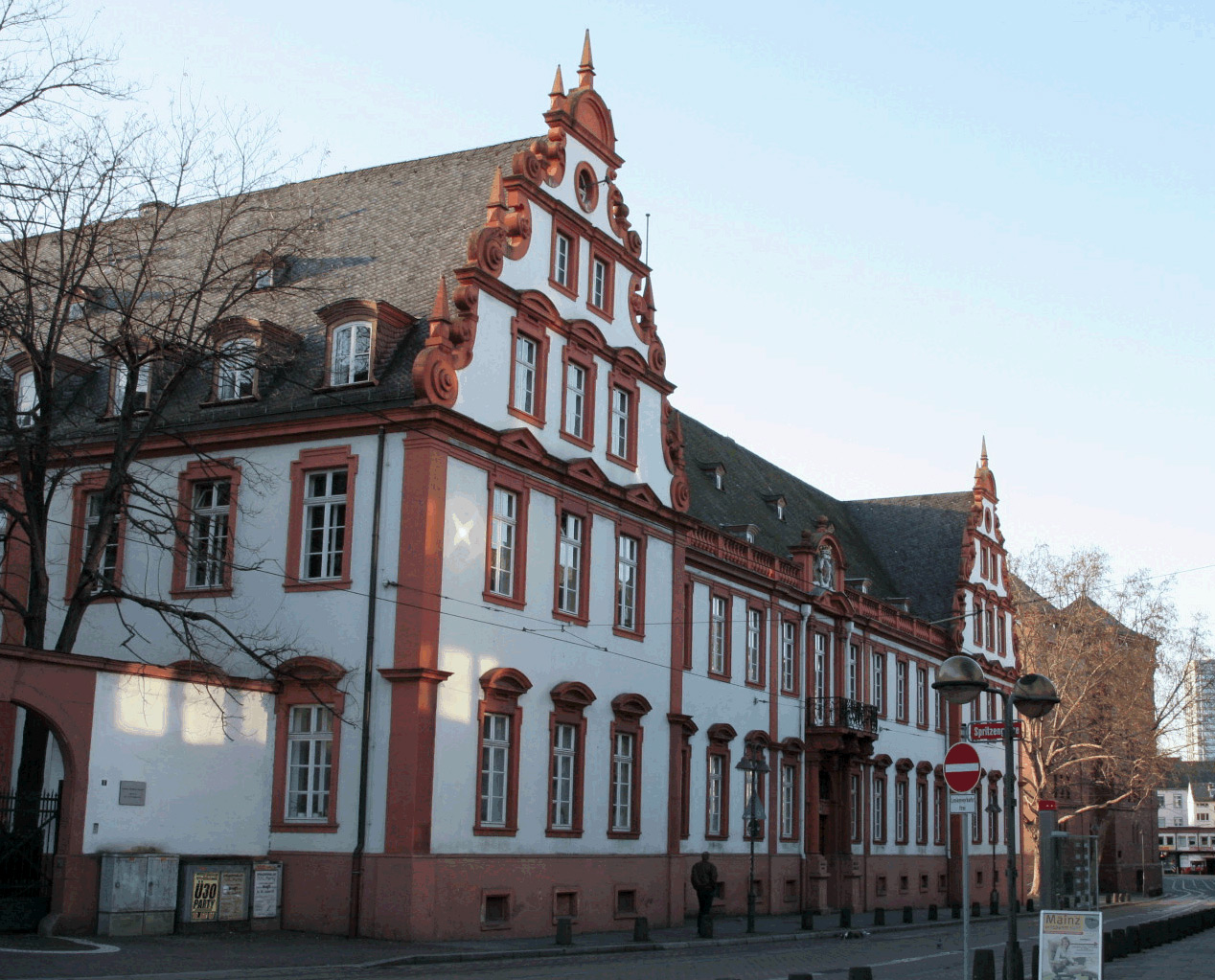
Schönborner Hof* (Mainz)

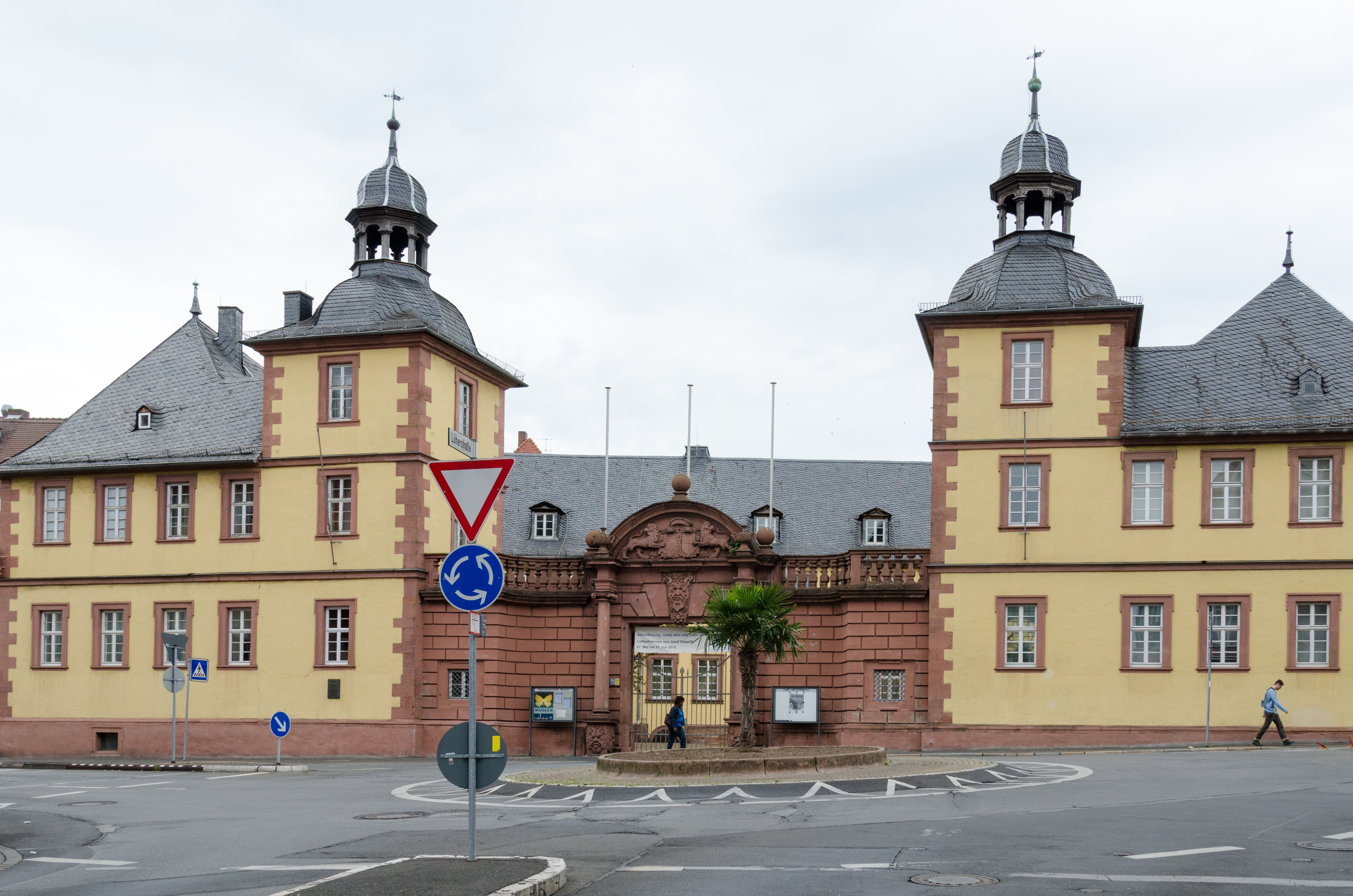
Schönborner Hof (Aschaffenburg)

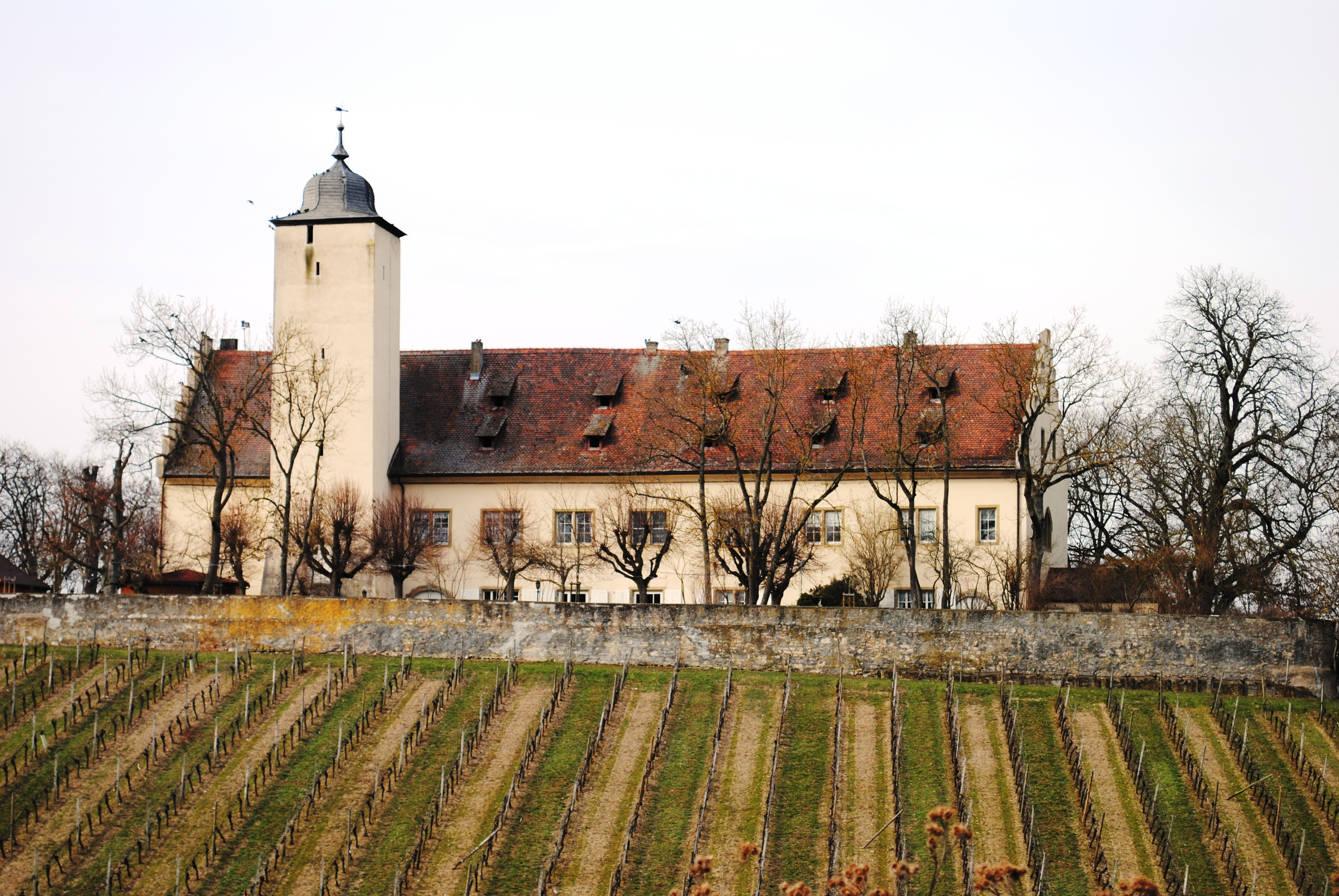
Hallburg castle*

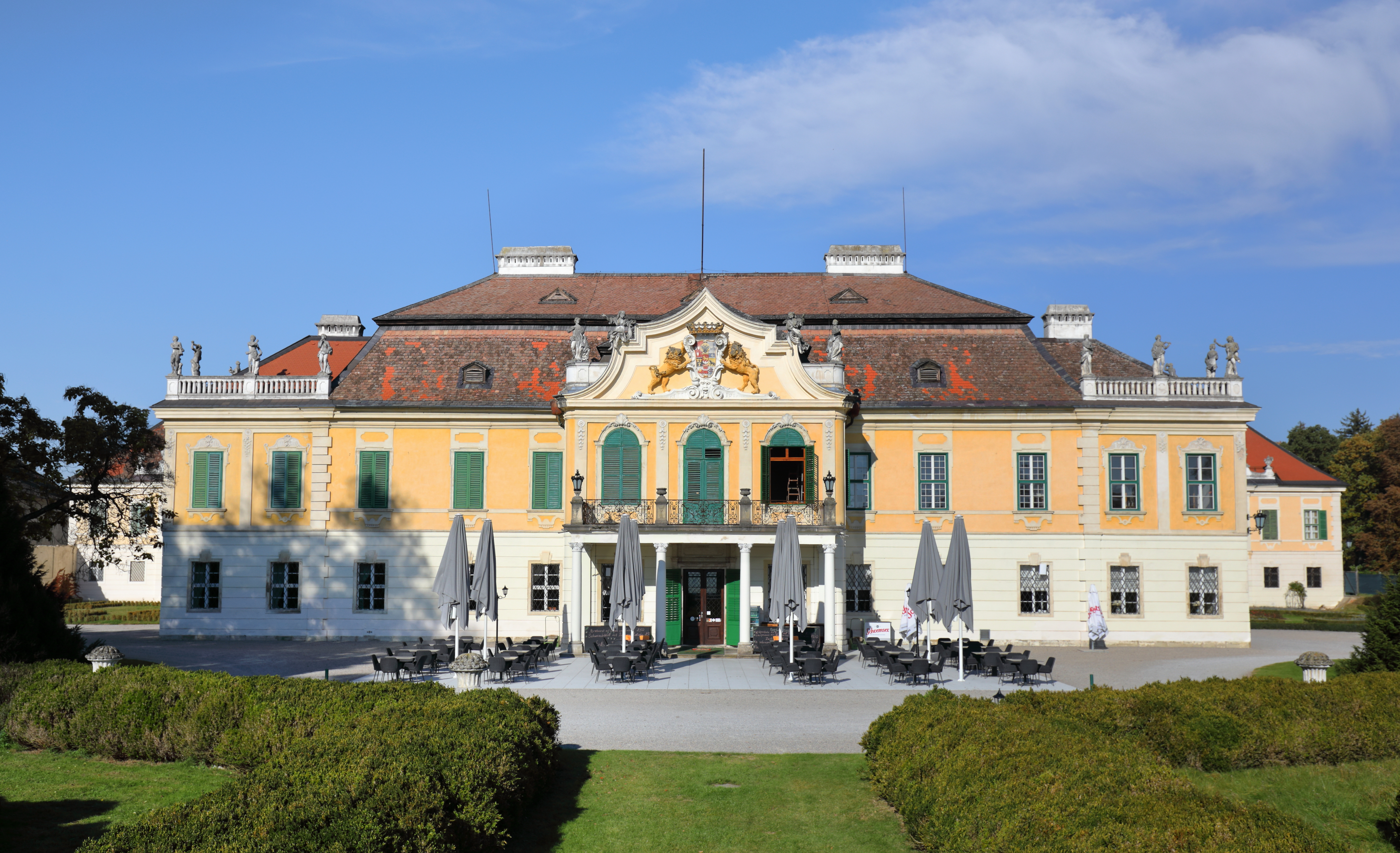
Schloss Schönborn, Austria*

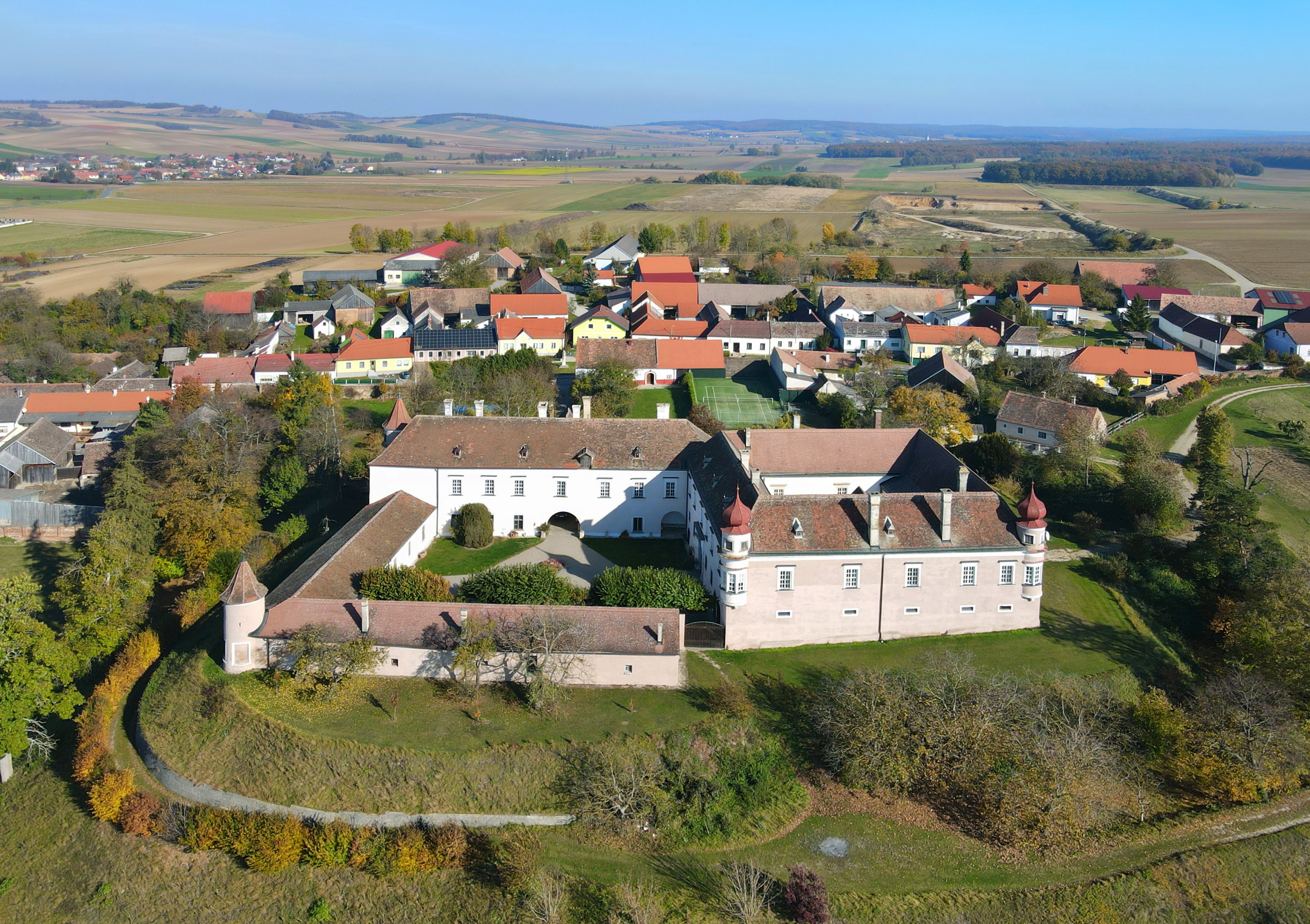
Weyerburg castle, Austria*

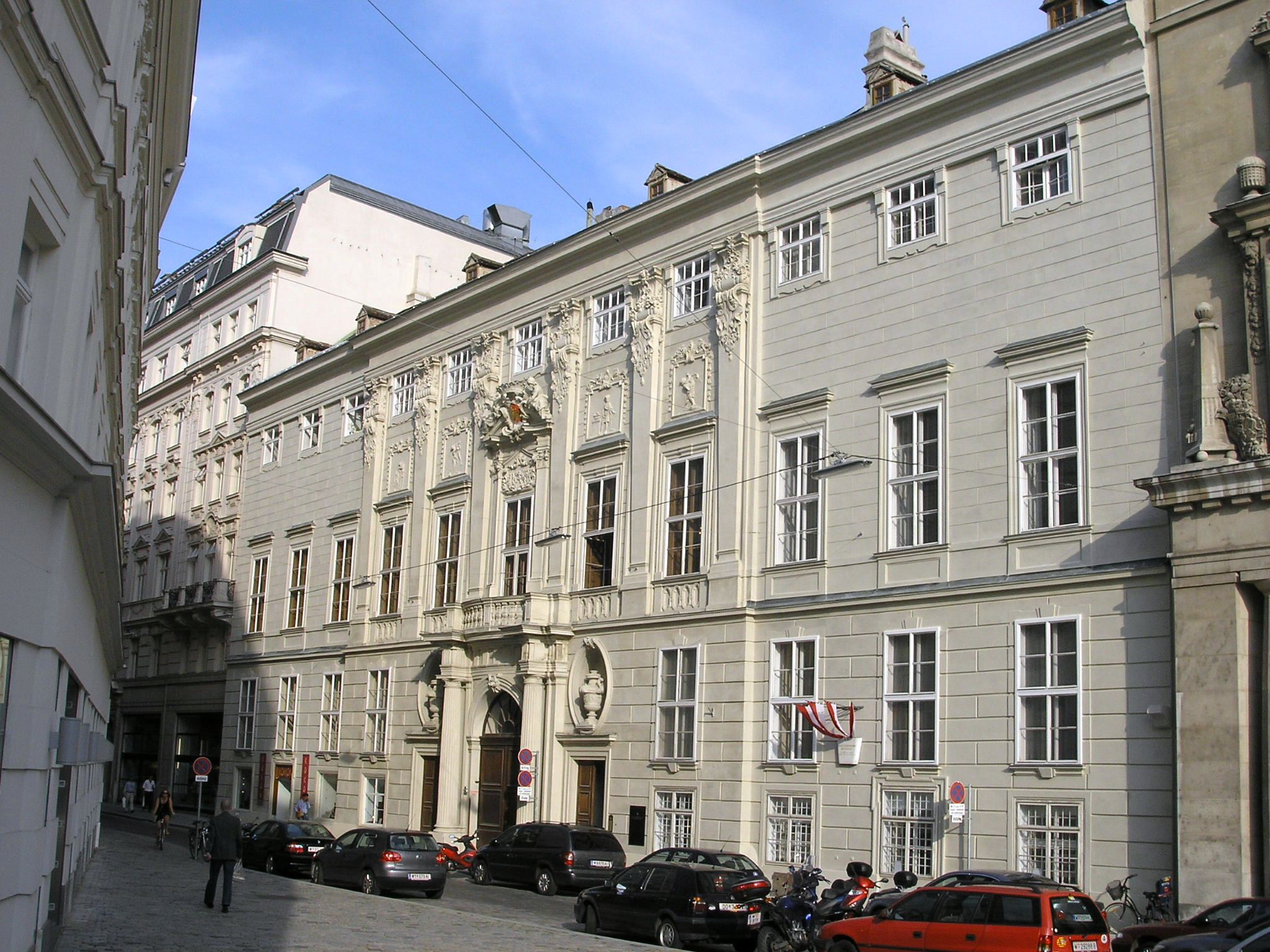
Palais Schönborn-Batthyány, Vienna*

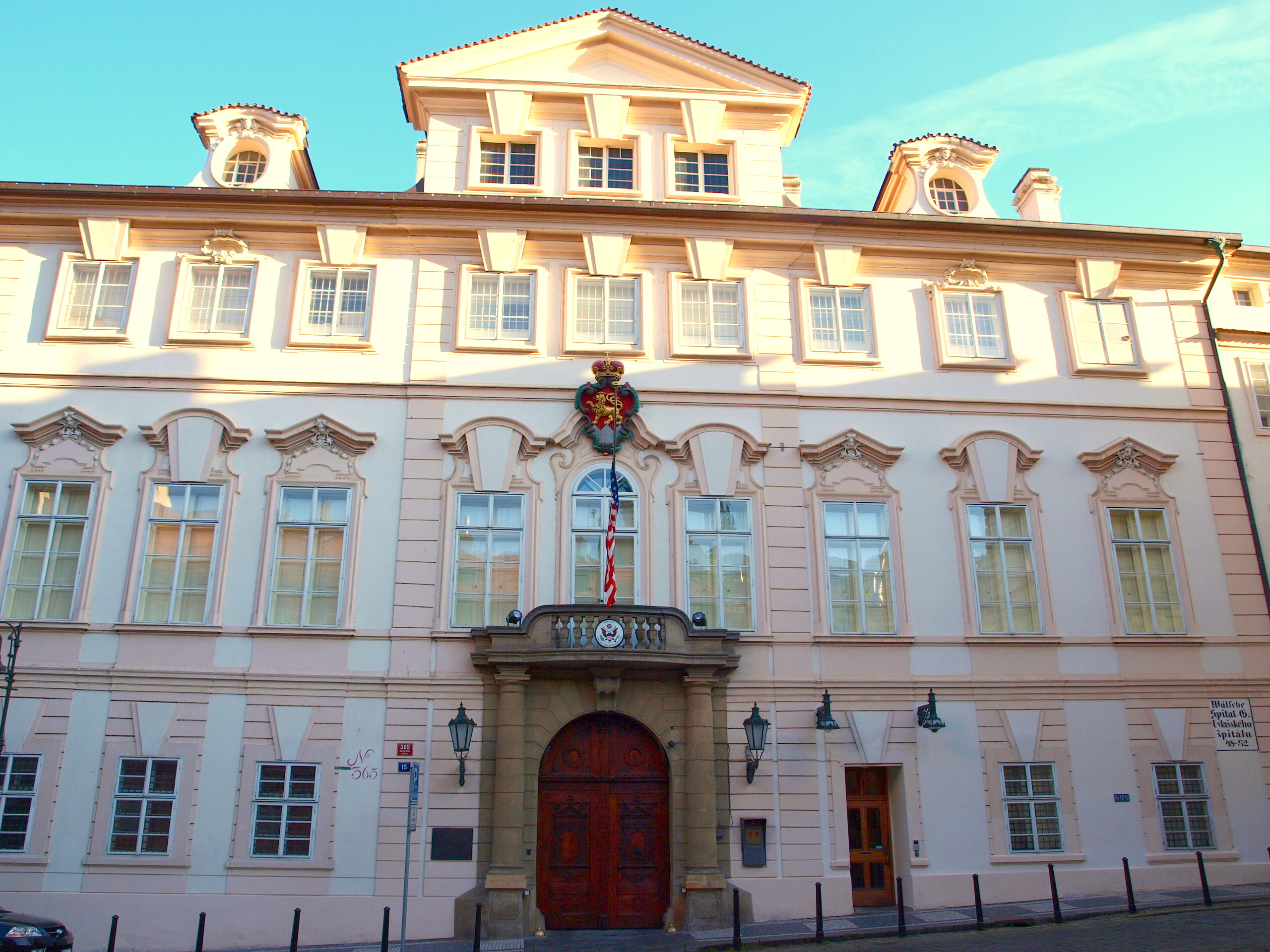
Schönborn Palace (Prague)

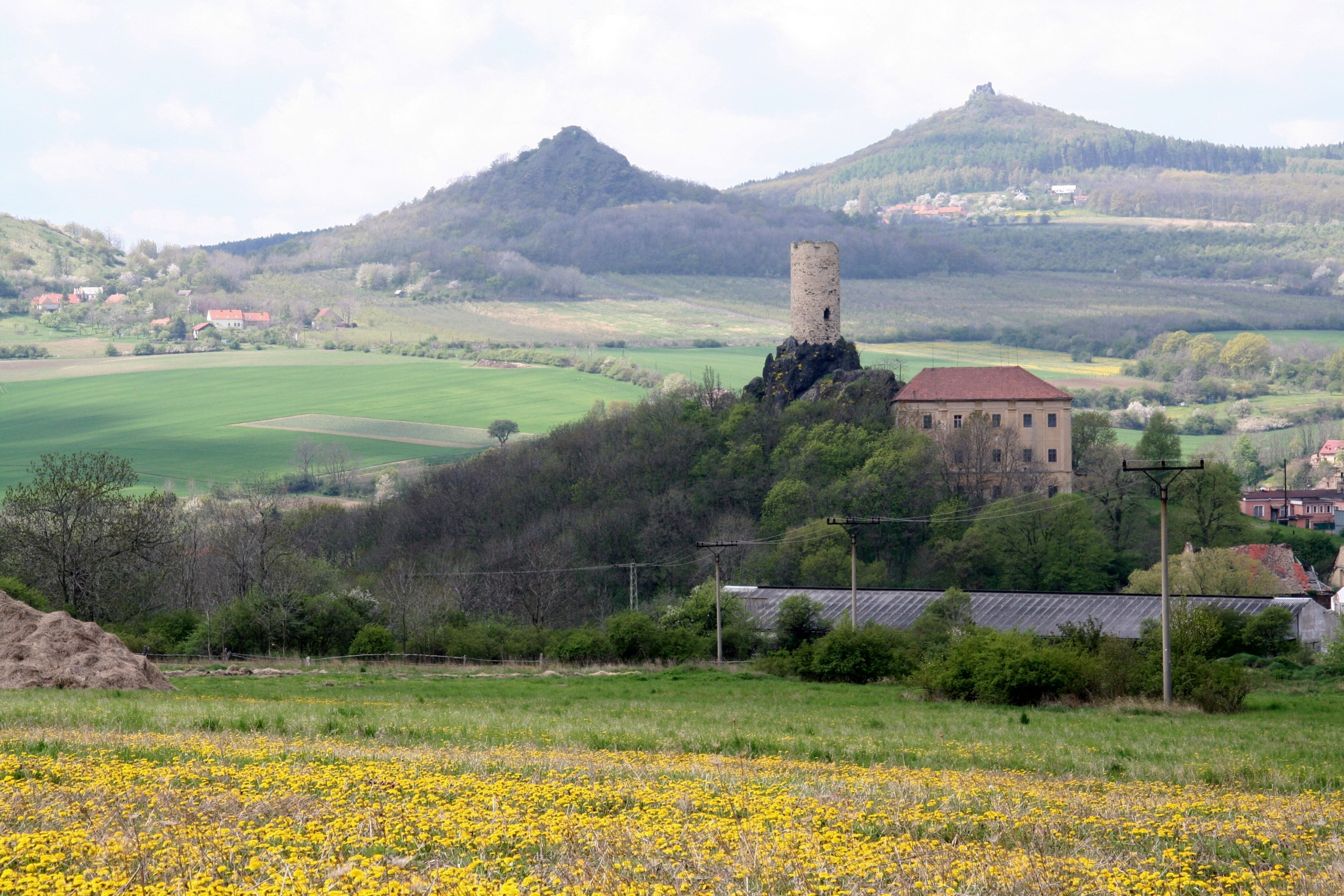
Skalka Castle, Vlastislav, Bohemia, birthplace of Cardinal Christoph Schönborn

=== Churches ===
More than 100 churches were built during the rule of Schönborn bishops, many of them by their famous court architect Balthasar Neumann, among them:

- Würzburg Residence court chapel
- Basilica of the Fourteen Holy Helpers
- Court chapel of Meersburg Residence
- Pilgrimage church of the Holy Trinity at Gößweinstein
- St Mauritius (Wiesentheid)
- St Cäcilia (Heusenstamm)
- Basilica of St. Paulinus, Trier
- St Laurence at Dirmstein
- St. Peter at Bruchsal
- Prüm Abbey, new buildings from 1748
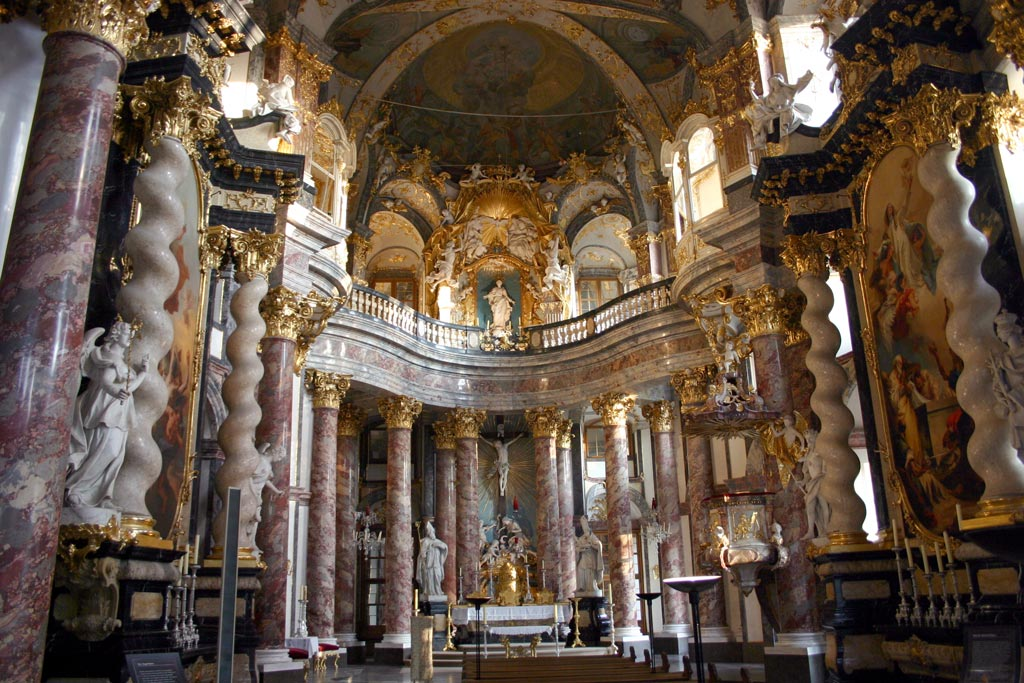
Court chapel of Würzburg Residence

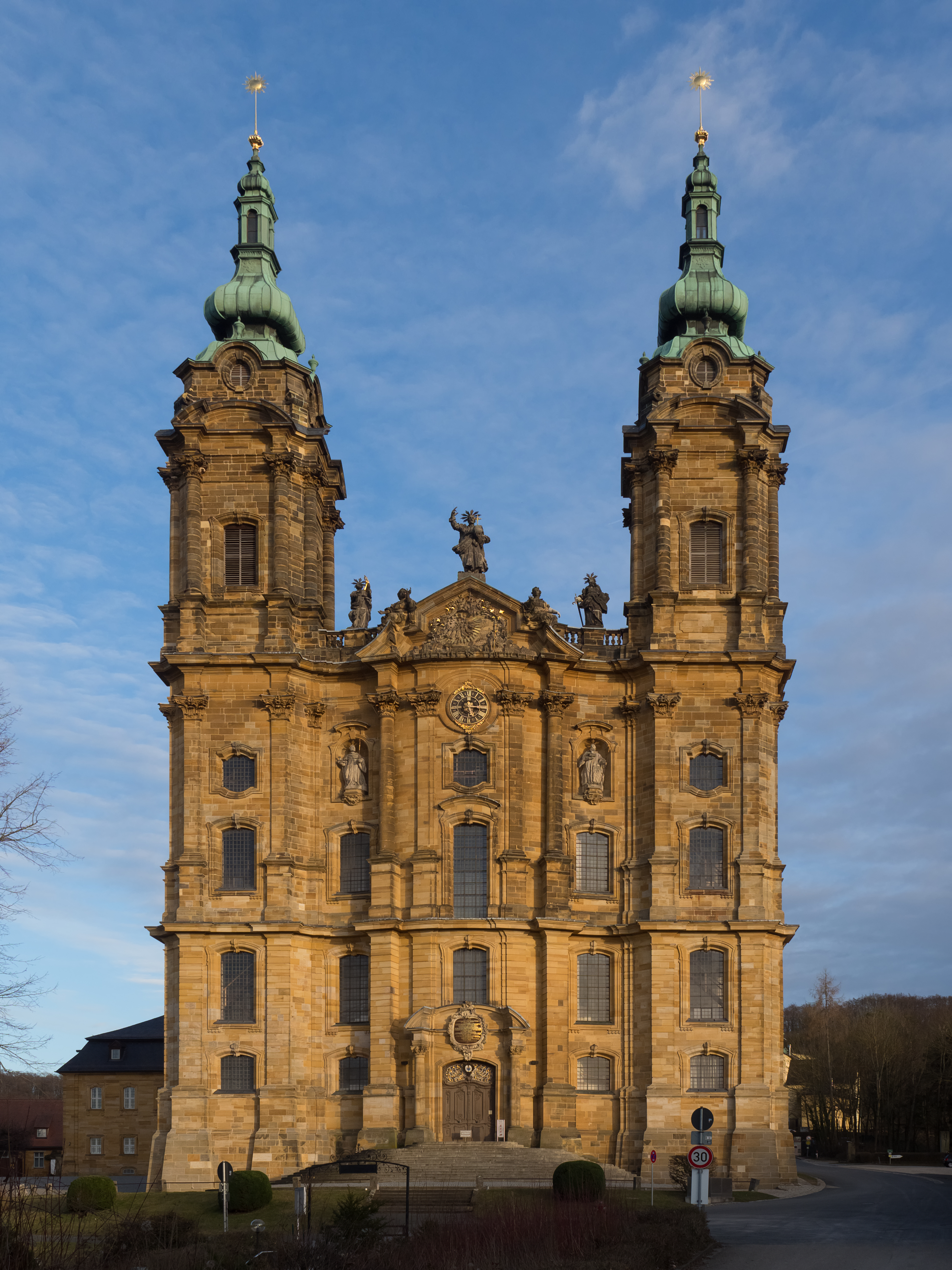
Basilica of the Fourteen Holy Helpers

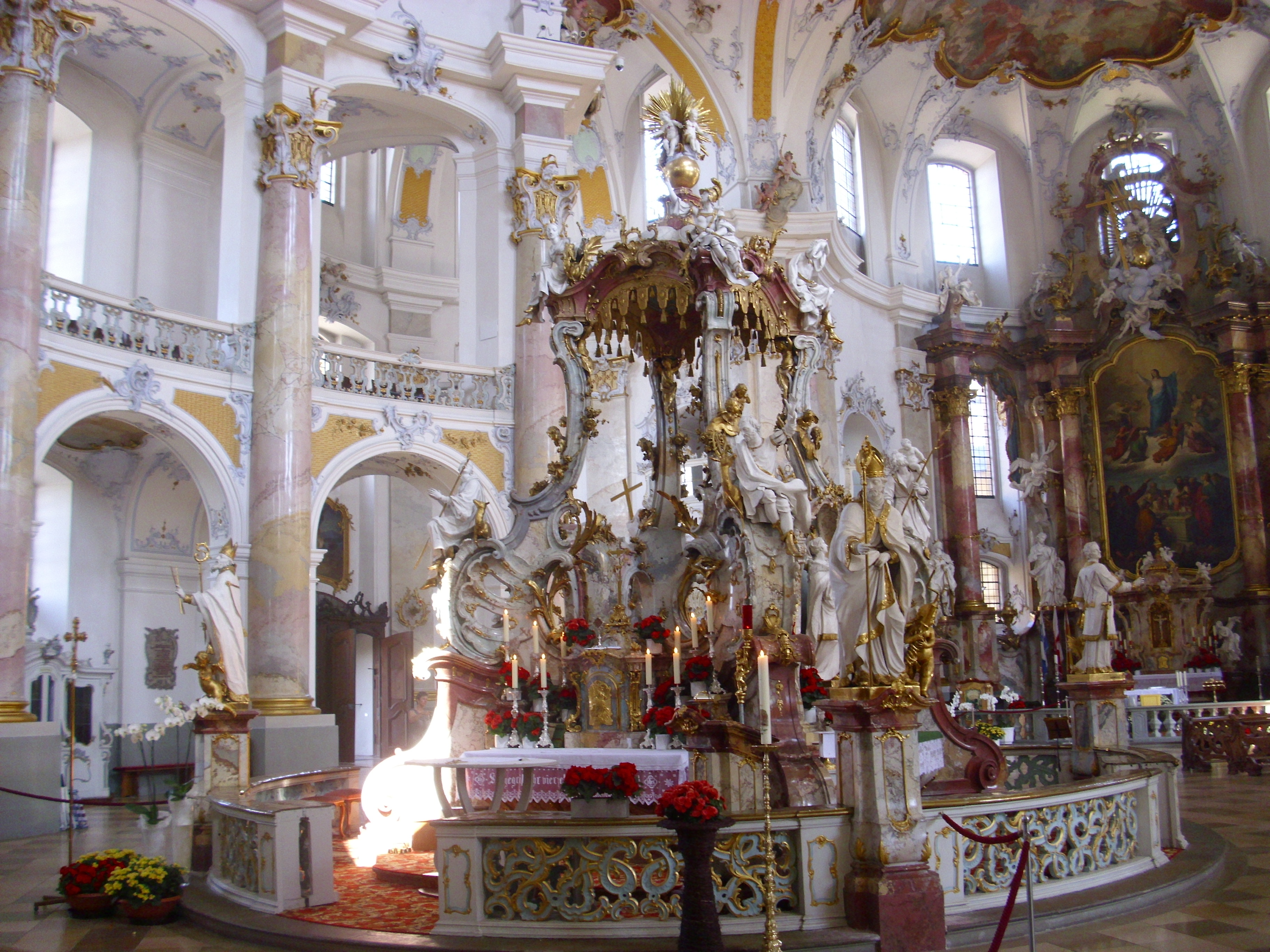
Basilica of the Fourteen Holy Helpers

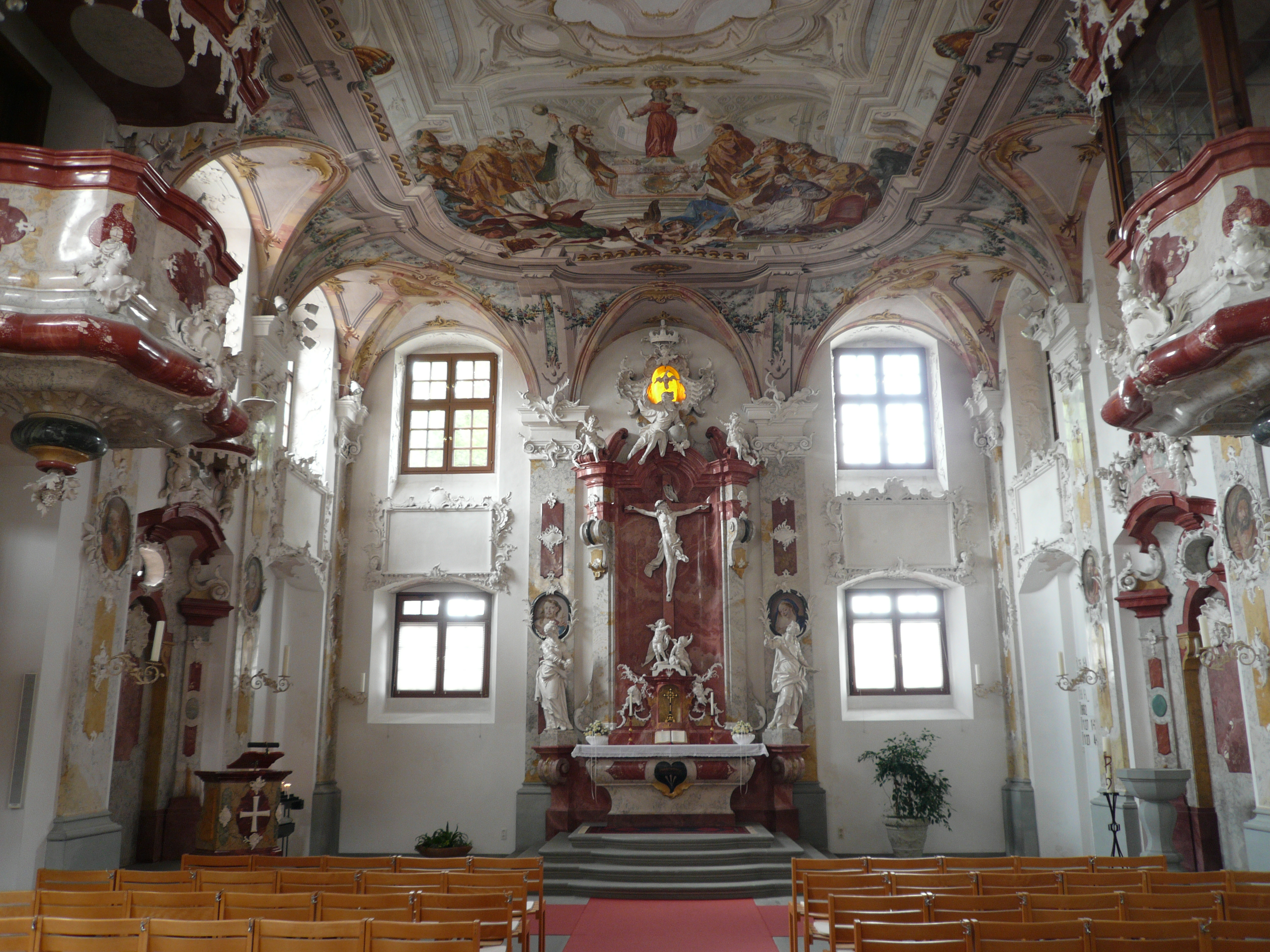
Court chapel of Meersburg

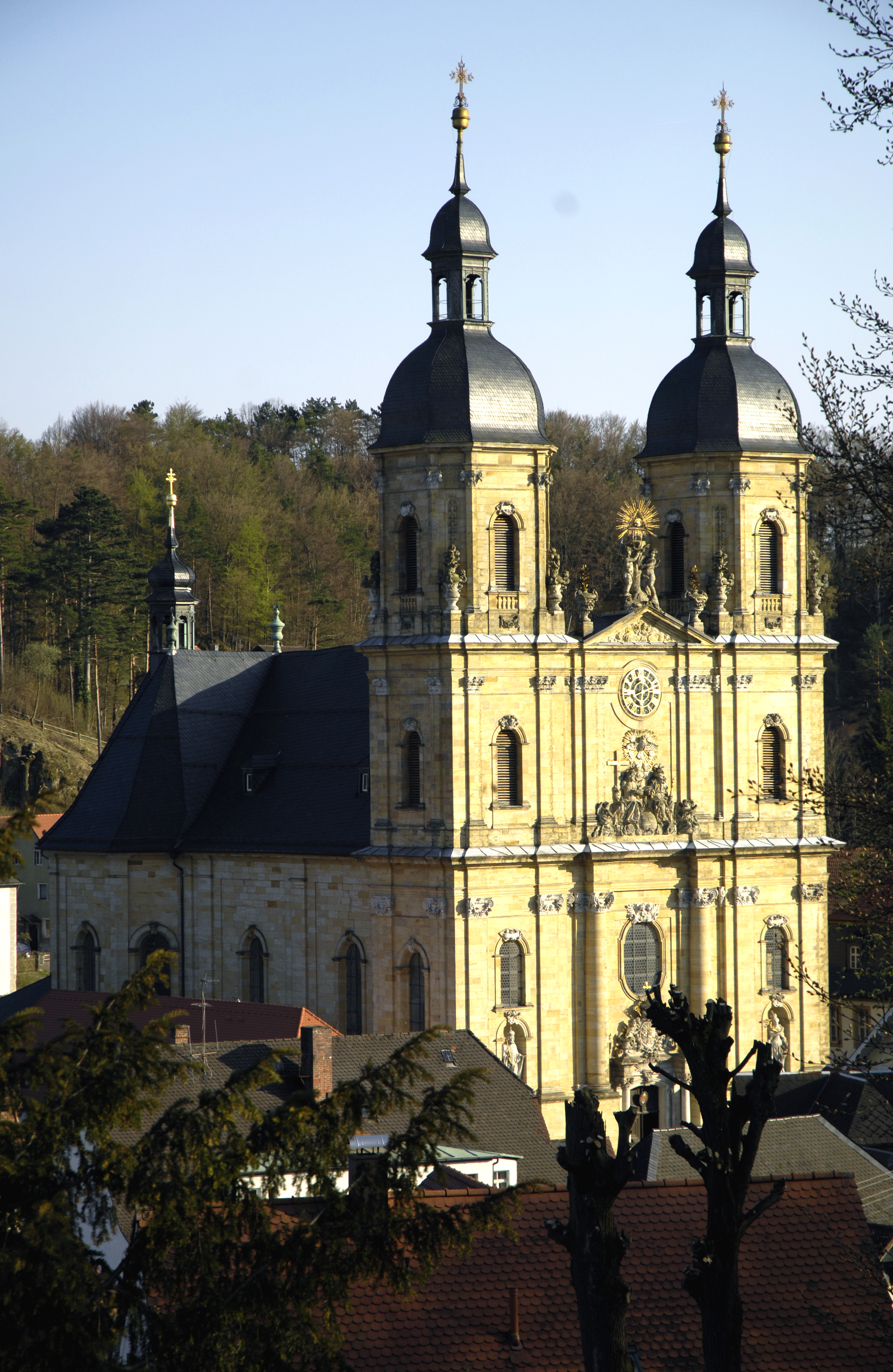
Holy Trinity church at Gößweinstein

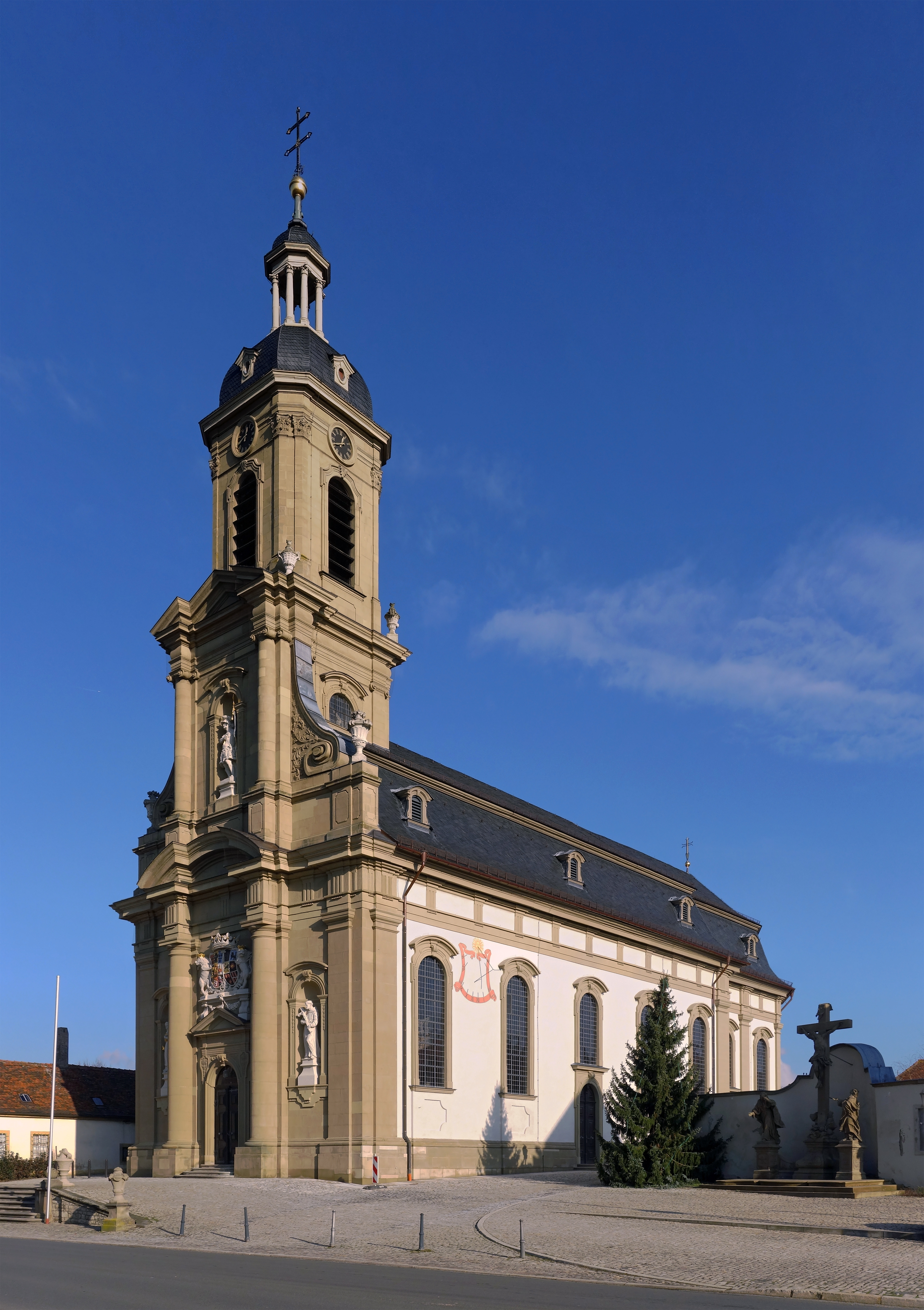
St. Mauritius, Wiesentheid

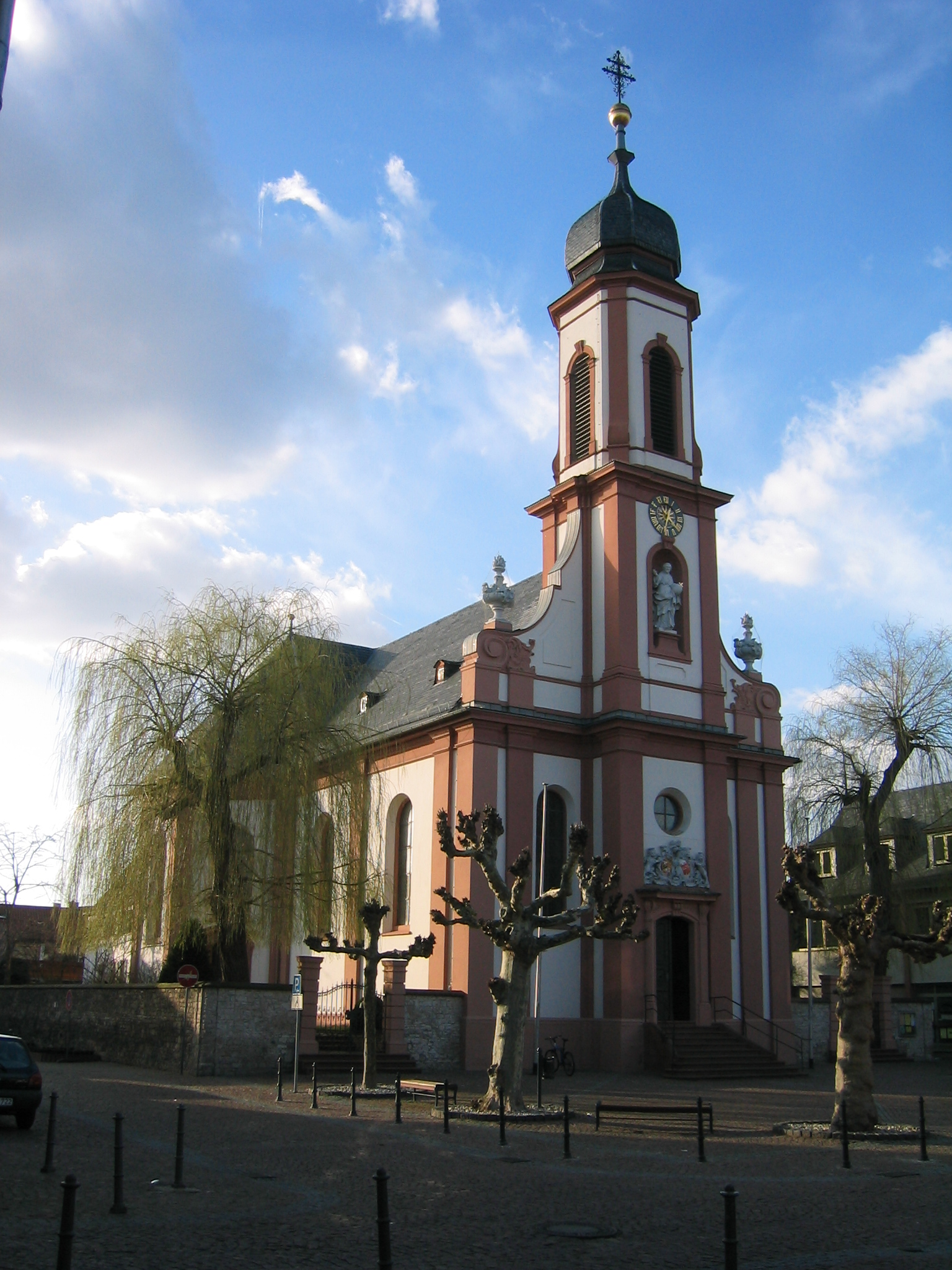
St. Cecilia, Heusenstamm

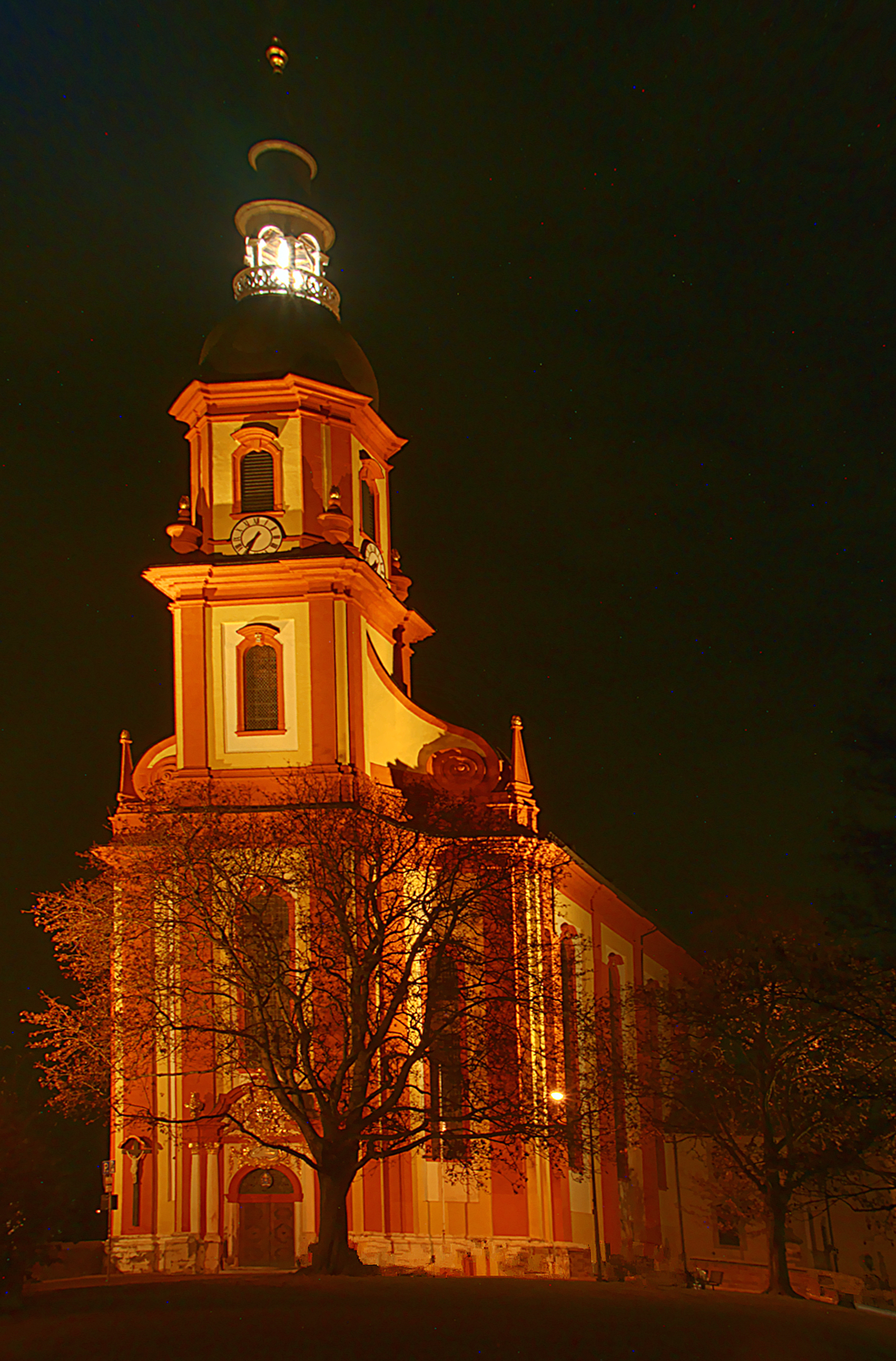
St. Paul at Trier

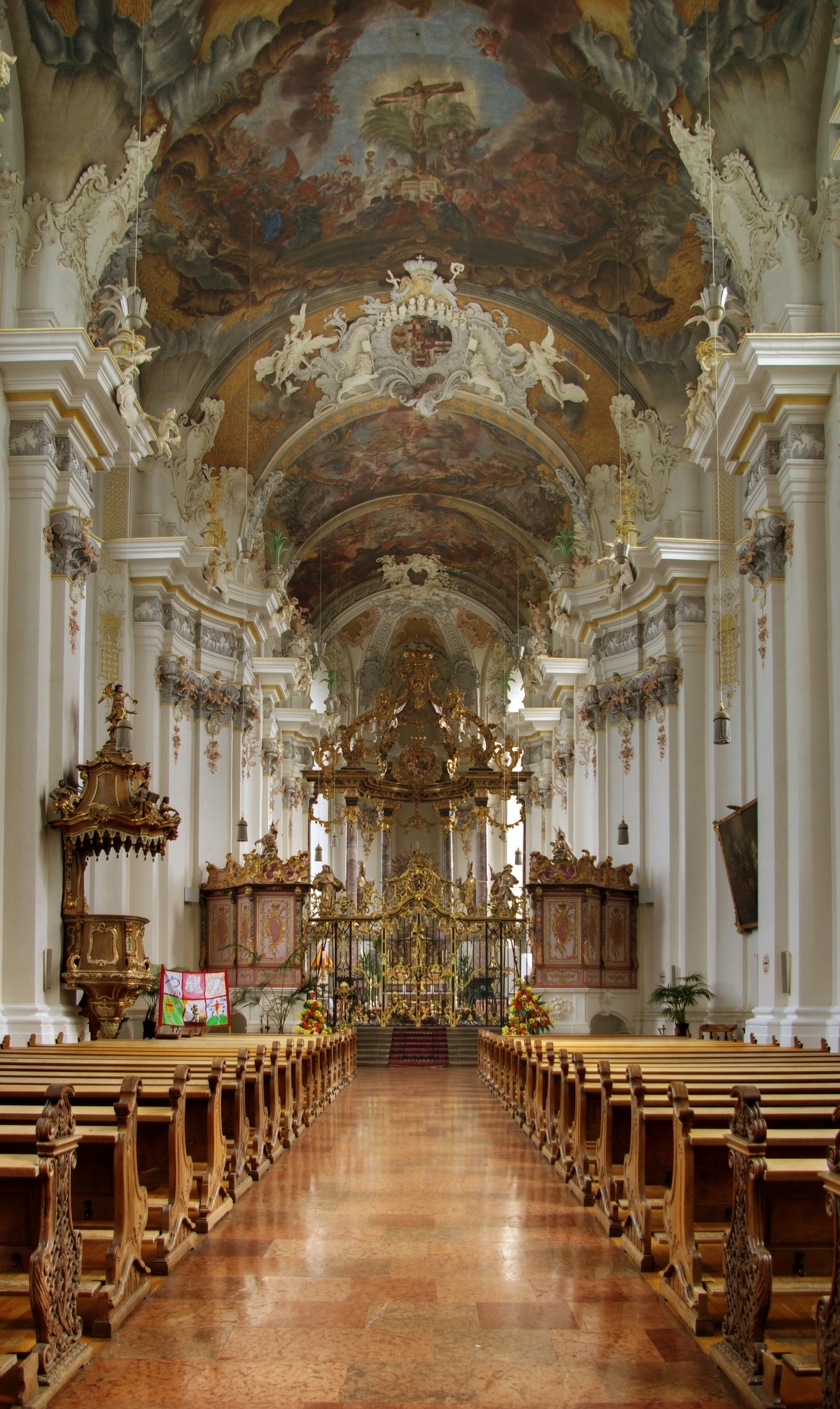
St. Paul, Trier

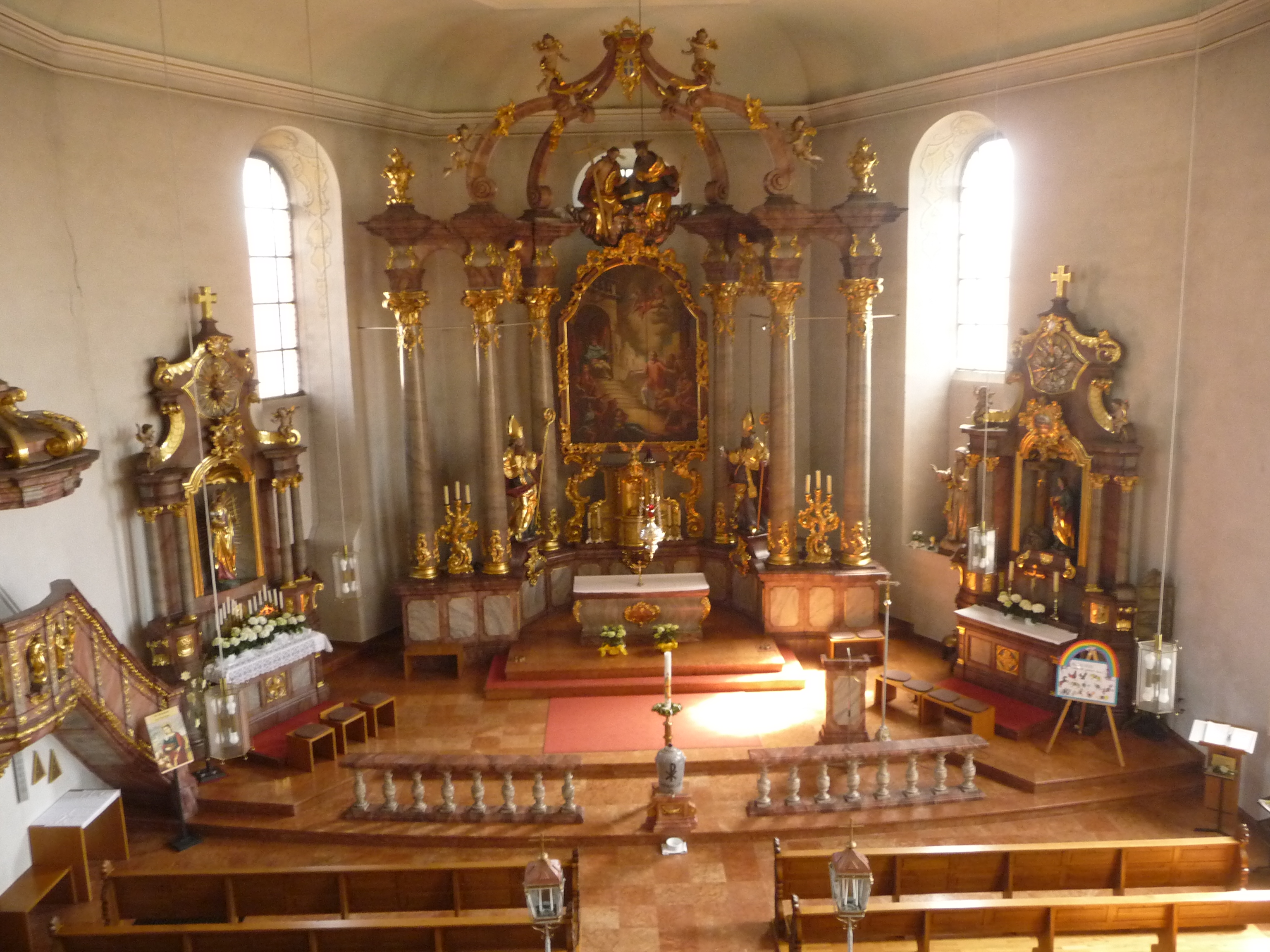
St. Laurence, Dirmstein

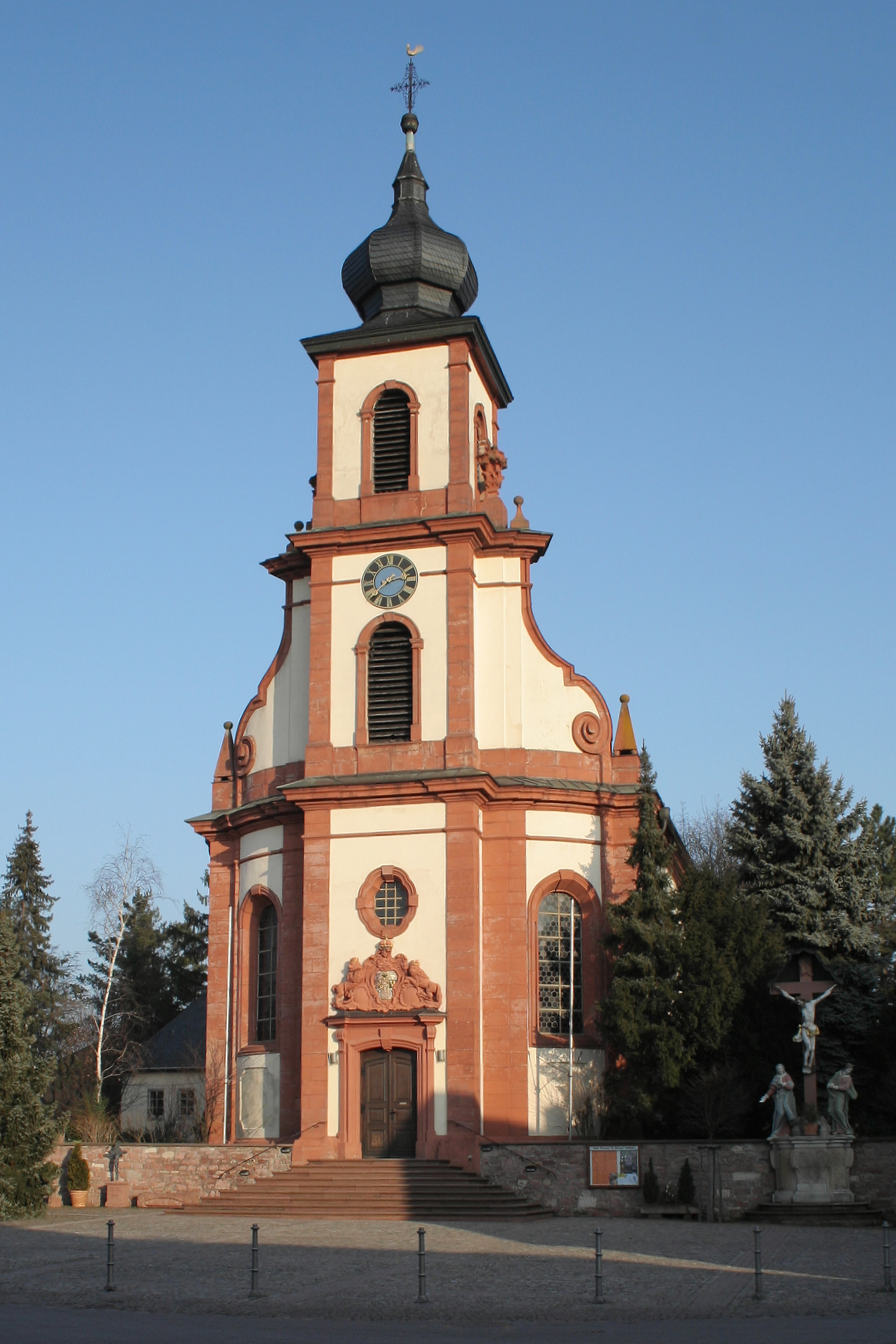
St. Michael, Hofheim

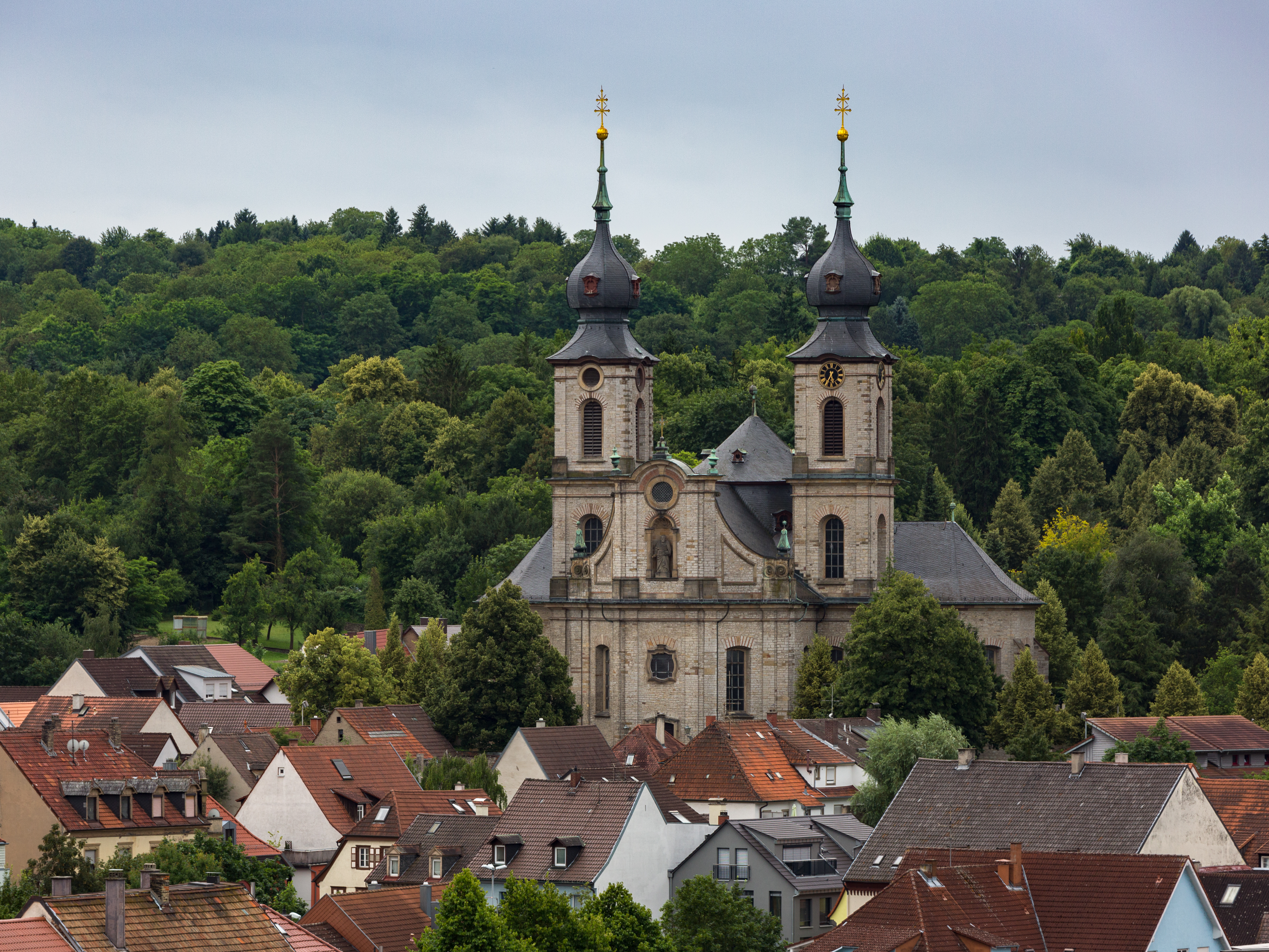
St. Peter at Bruchsal

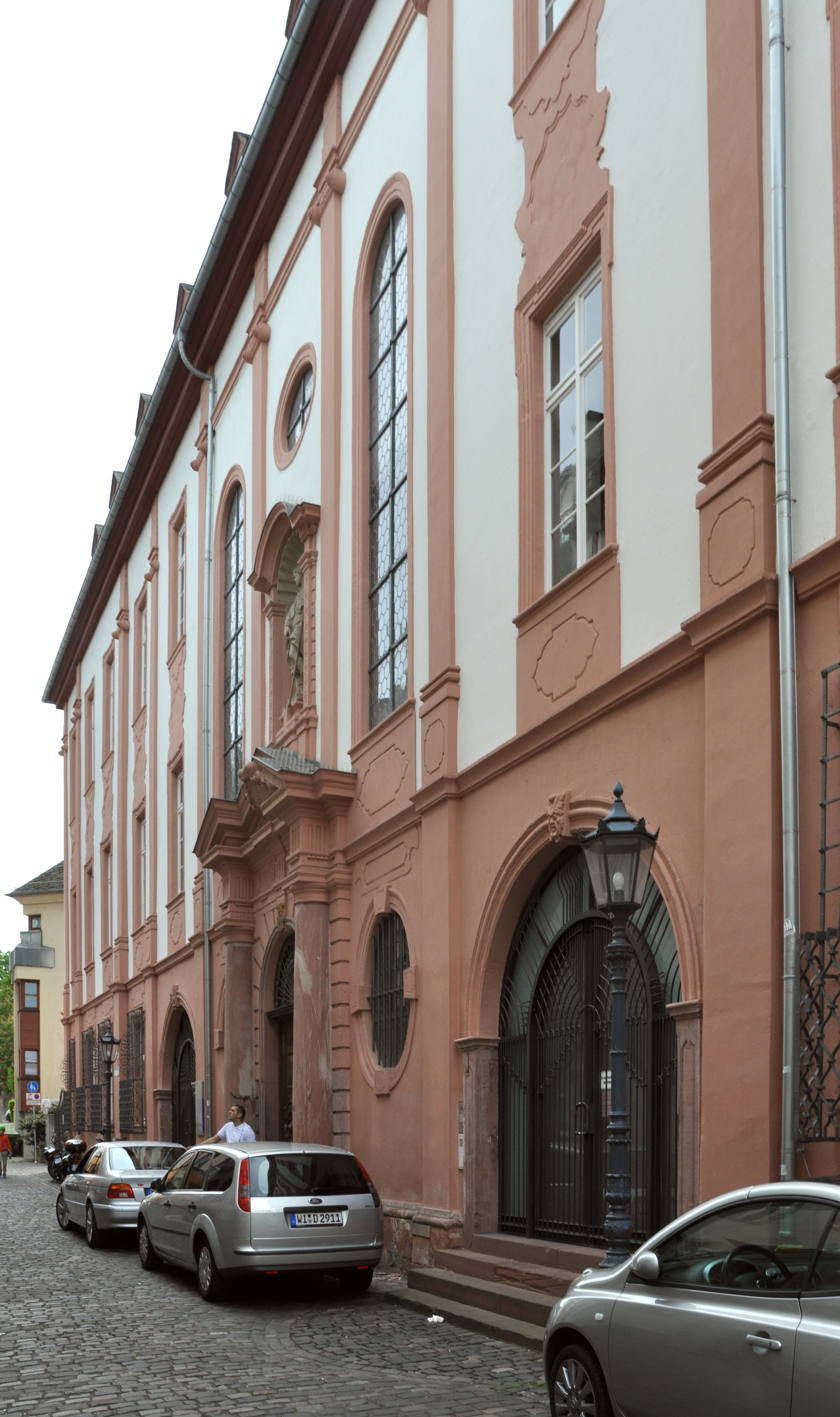
St. Rochus Hospital, Mainz

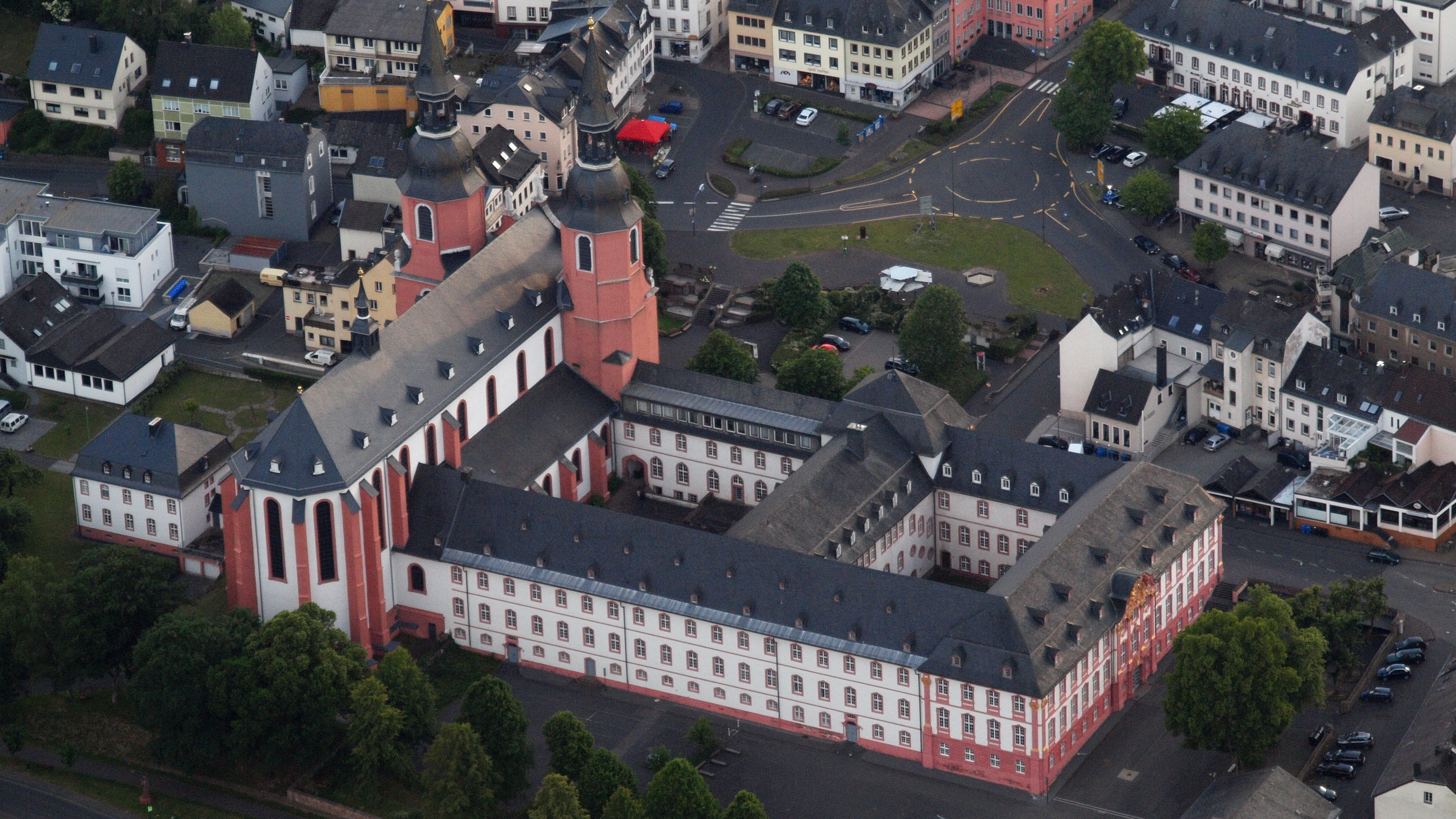
Prüm Abbey

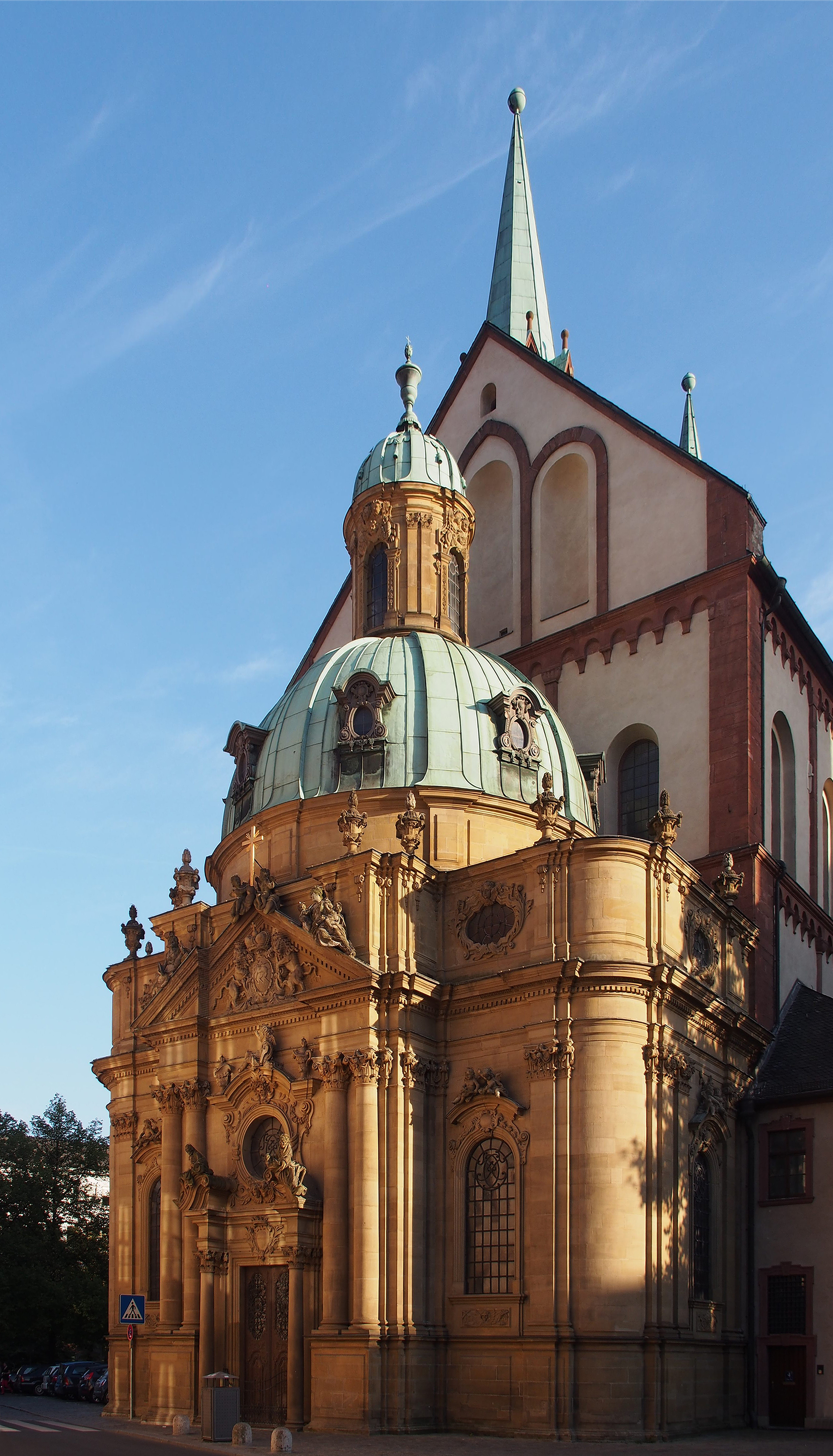
Würzburg Cathedral with adjacent Schönborn burial chapel

=== Ecclesiastical and official residences ===
- Fortress of Mainz and Mainz Citadel (built between 1655 and 1675 for Johann Philipp)
- New Residence in Bamberg (built from 1697 for Lothar Franz)
- Favorite Palace in Mainz (built from 1700 for Lothar Franz)
- The Federal Chancellery of Austria, built 1717–1719 for Vice-Chancellor Friedrich Karl von Schönborn
- Blauer Hof Laxenburg (1710–1720 for Friedrich Karl)
- Würzburg Residence (built from 1719 for Johann Philipp Franz von Schönborn, accomplished under Friedrich Karl)
- Bruchsal Palace (built from 1720 for Damian Hugo)
- Imperial Chancellory Wing of the Hofburg Palace in Vienna (1723–30 under Vice-Chancellor Friedrich Karl von Schönborn)
- Schloss Werneck (built from 1733 for Friedrich Karl)
- Schloss Philippsburg (Dicasterial Building), Koblenz (1738–1749 for Franz Georg)
- Neues Schloss (Meersburg), completion of the palace (from 1740 for Damian Hugo)
- Schloss Schönbornslust at Koblenz-Kesselheim (1748–1752 for Franz Georg)

== Gallery ==
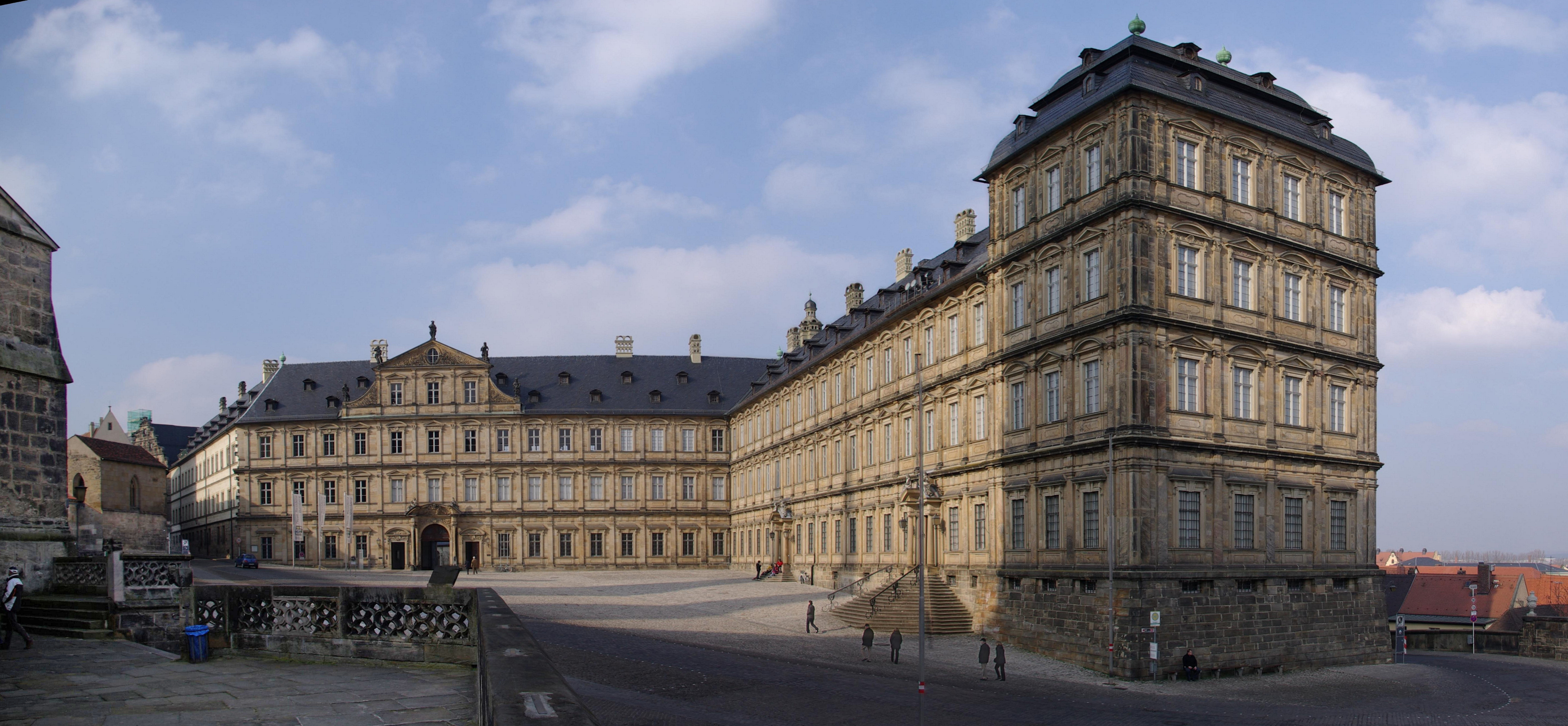
The New Residence of the Bishops at Bamberg, built 1697-1703 for Lothar Franz von Schönborn

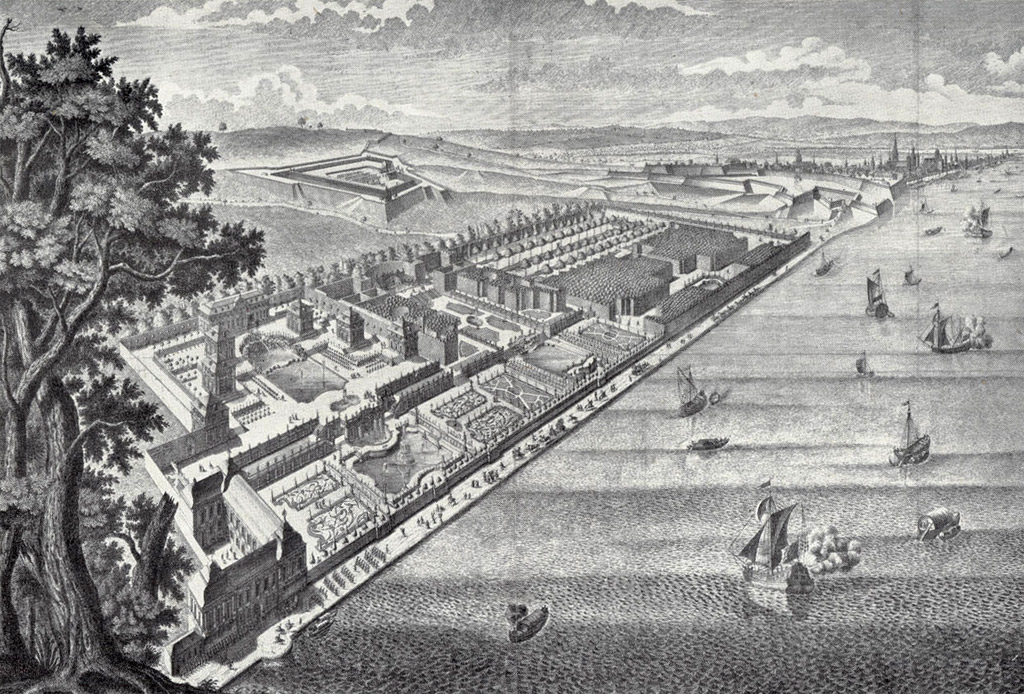
Favorite Palace at Mainz, built 1700-1722 for Lothar Franz

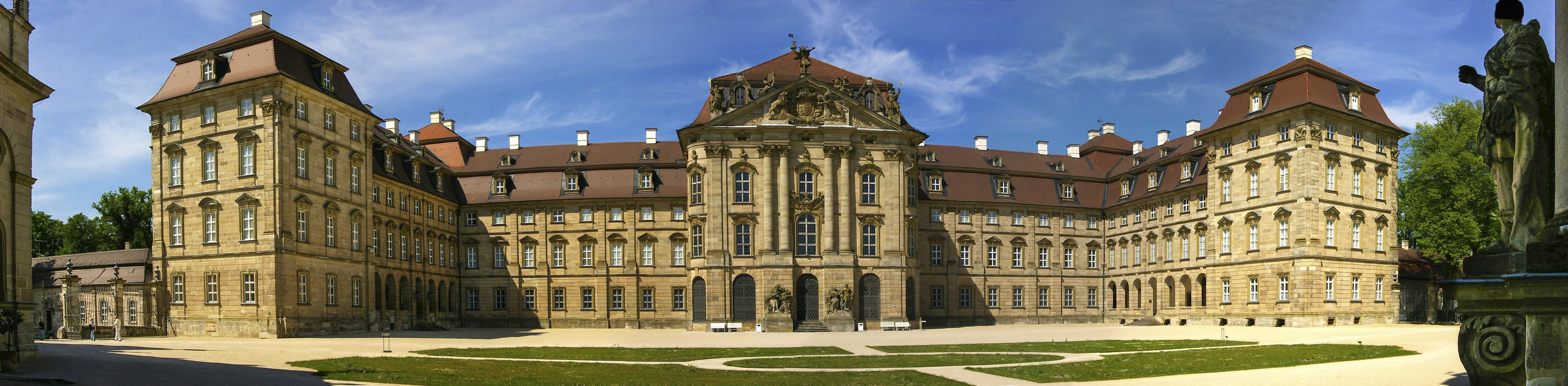
Schloss Weissenstein at Pommersfelden, built 1711-1718 for Lothar Franz, to this day a private residence of the Counts of Schönborn-Wiesentheid

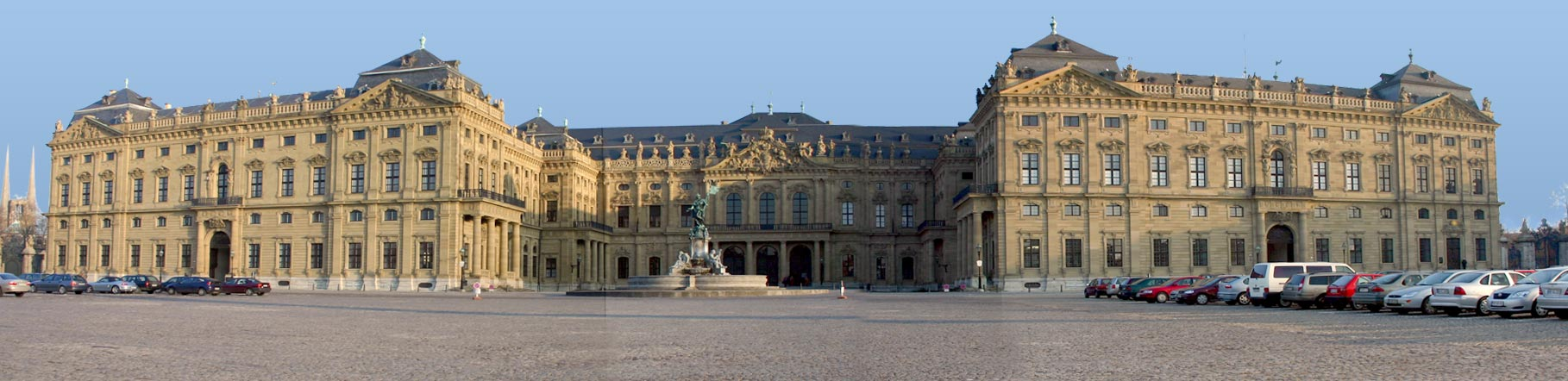
Würzburg Residence, one of the most impressive baroque palaces in Germany, built 1719-1744 for Johann Philipp Franz von Schönborn and Friedrich Karl von Schönborn

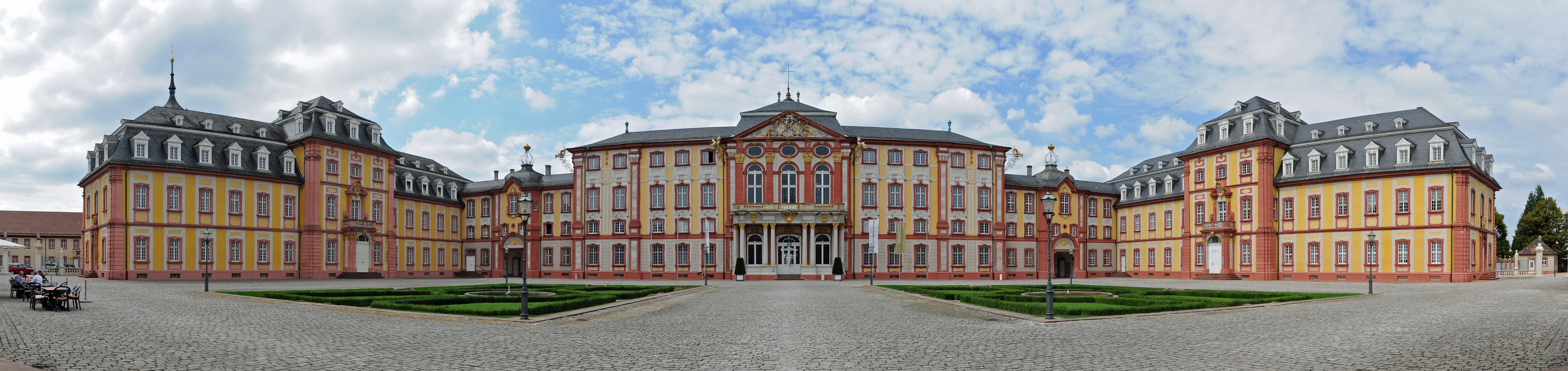
Bruchsal Palace, built from 1720 for Damian Hugo Philipp von Schönborn

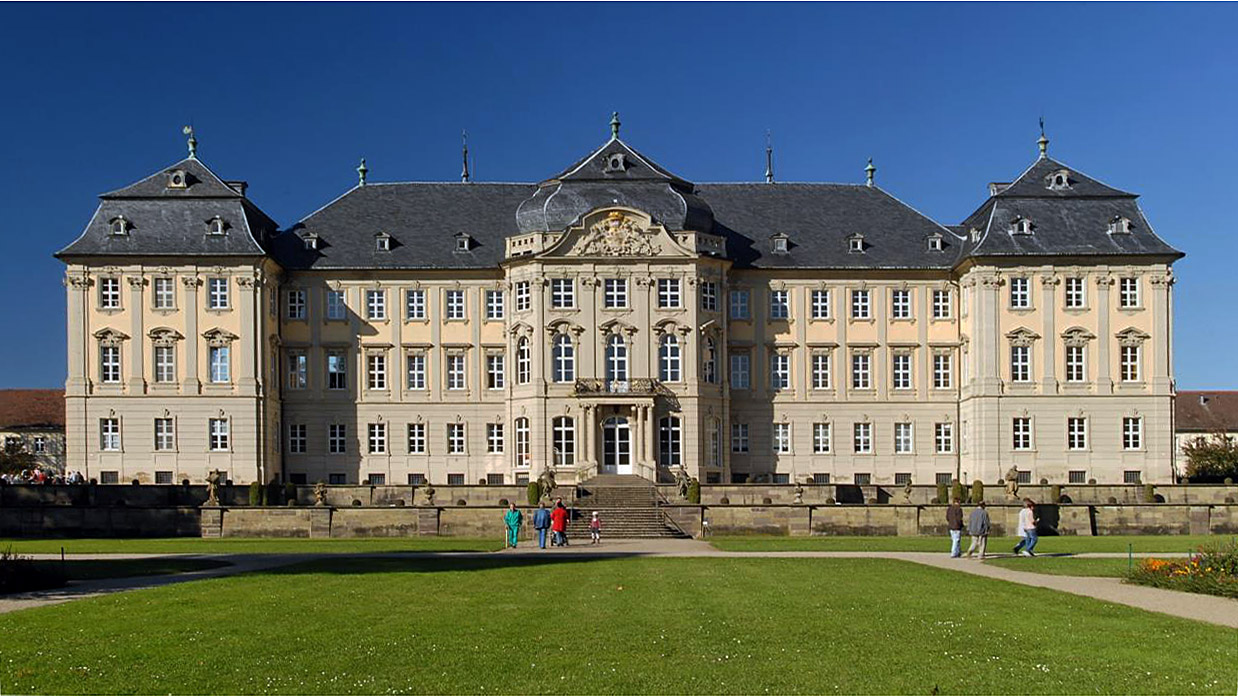
Werneck Palace, built 1733-1745 for Friedrich Karl von Schönborn

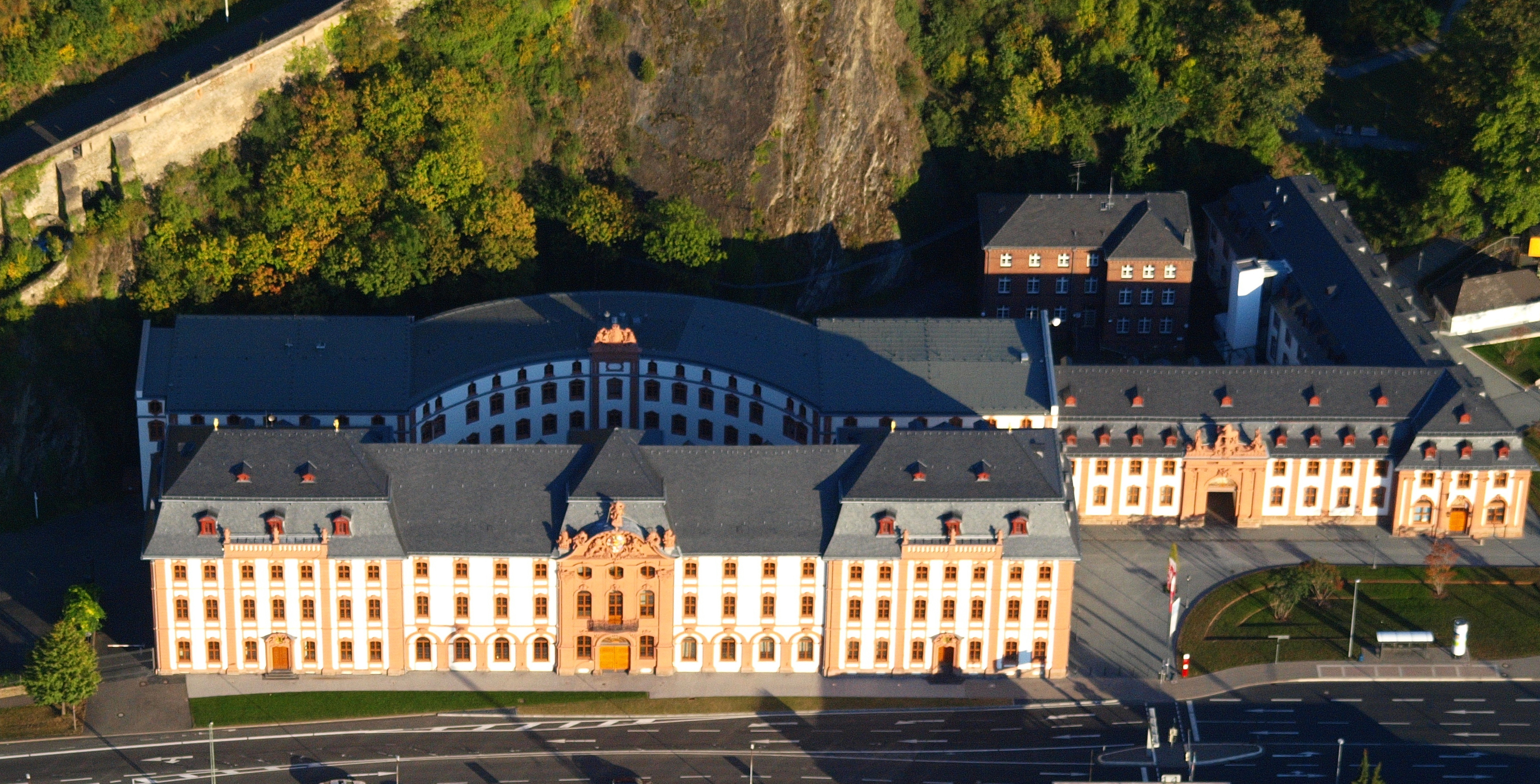
Philippsburg Palace at Koblenz, built 1738-1749 for Franz Georg von Schönborn

== See also ==
- Franziskus von Paula Graf von Schönborn
