= Eugen Erwein von Schönborn-Heusenstamm =

Count of Schönborn-Heusenstamm (1727–1801)

Eugen Erwein von Schönborn
- Count of Schönborn-Heusenstamm
- Born: 27 January 1727; Mainz
- Died: 25 July 1801 (aged 74); Vienna
- Spouse: Elisabeth Josepha zu Salm-Salm
- House: Schönborn-Heusenstamm
- Father: Anselm Franz von Schönborn-Heusenstamm
- Mother: Maria Theresia von Montfort-Tettnang

Eugen Erwein von Schönborn-Heusenstamm (27 January 1727 – 25 July 1801) was Imperial and Royal Privy Councillor and Colonel Hereditary Cupist of Austria.

== Early life ==
Schönborn was born on 27 January 1727 in Mainz, a few months after the death of his father, Anselm Franz von Schönborn-Heusenstamm (1681–1726). His mother, Countess Maria Theresia von Montfort (1698–1751), was a daughter of Count Anton III von Montfort-Pfannberg and Countess Maria Anna Leopoldine von Thun und Hohenstein.

His father was a younger son of Melchior Friedrich von Schönborn-Buchheim, a Minister of State of the Electorate of Mainz, and the former Baroness Maria Anna Sophia Johanna von Boineburg-Lengsfeld. Among his extended family were uncles, the Prince-Bishops of Würzburg Johann Philipp Franz von Schönborn, Friedrich Karl von Schönborn-Buchheim (who served as Vice-Chancellor of the Holy Roman Empire under Joseph I from 1705 to 1734), and Prince-Bishop of Speyer Damian Hugo Philipp von Schönborn-Buchheim, as well as the diplomat and composer Rudolf Franz Erwein von Schönborn and the Elector and Archbishop of Trier, Franz Georg von Schönborn.

== Career ==
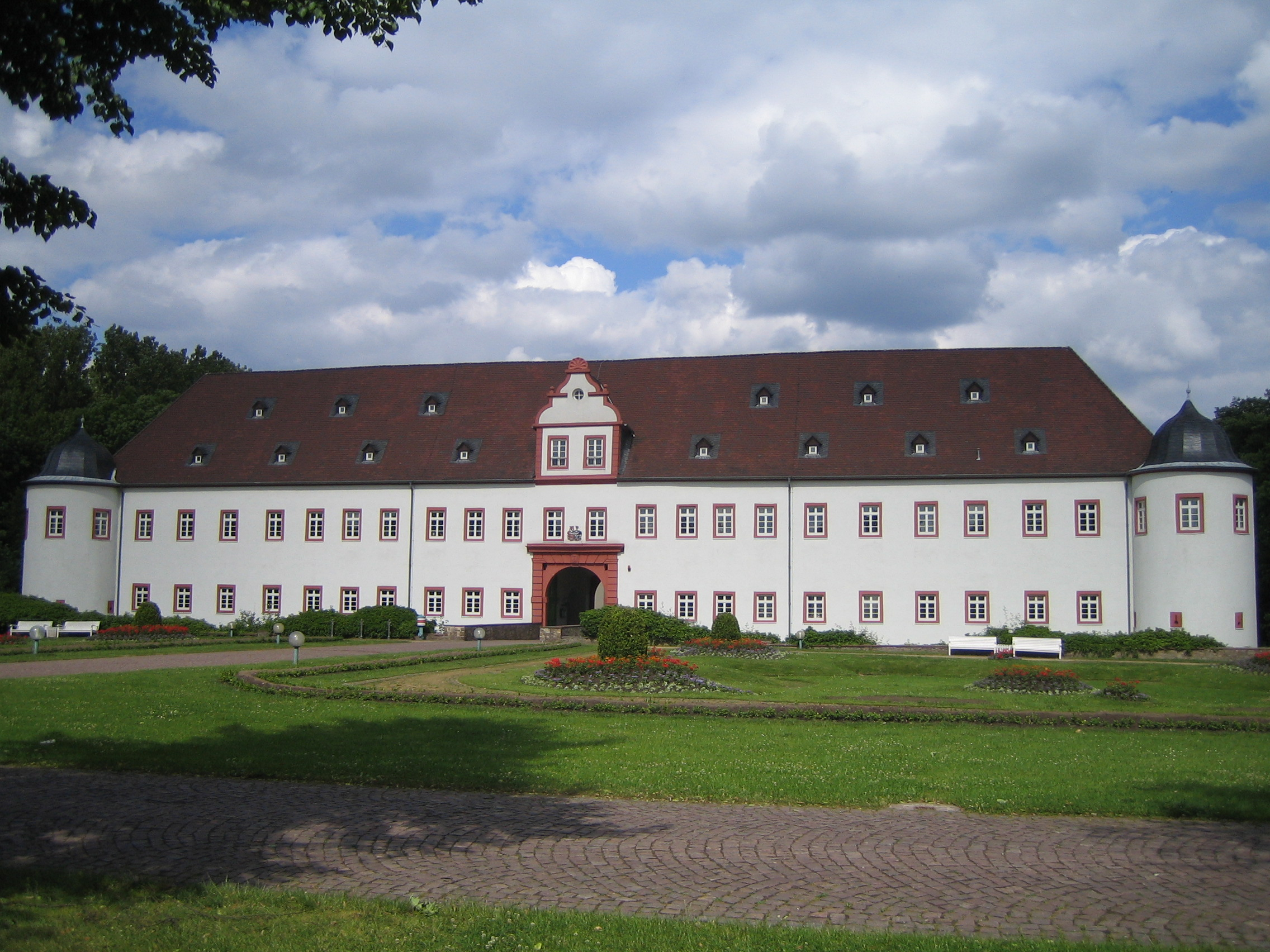
Heusenstamm Castle, built by his grandfather, Baron Philipp Erwein von Schönborn

Upon his birth, he became reigning Count of the County of Schönborn-Heusenstamm, a German statelet formed in 1717 as a partition of Schönborn (in the south of modern Hesse, Germany). The County included Heusenstamm Castle which had been built in 1661 by his grandfather, Baron Philipp Erwein von Schönborn. He expanded the family's significant holdings considerably. He inherited the Weyerburg estate and the Mautern an der Donau estate from his uncle. In 1766, he also bought the Rossatz estate, not far from Mautern. He bought Hessenstein Castle and the large Hungarian estate of Munkács from his uncle, Rudolf Franz. In Munkács, the Count built a hosiery factory and a sizable stud farm. In 1782, he built a bridge over the Latorica river.

After receiving his education, he became an Imperial Privy Councillor and Chamberlain and Supreme Hereditary Cupbearer of Austria. In 1790, he received the Order of the Golden Fleece.

== Personal life ==
In 1751, the Count married Princess Elisabeth Josepha zu Salm-Salm (1729–1775), a daughter of Prince Nikolaus Leopold zu Salm-Salm. The couple had five daughters and two sons, including:

- Marie Christine von Schönborn (1754–1797), who married Count Franz Stephan von Silva-Tarouca.
- Amalie Ludovica von Schönborn (1756–1802), who became a canoness in Mons.
- Maria Theresia von Schönborn (1758–1838), who married Count Johann Rudolf Czernin von und zu Chudenitz.
- Elisabeth Franziska von Schönborn (b. 1759), who became a canoness in Thorn.
- Maria Franziska von Schönborn (1763–1825), who married Franz Joseph von Sternberg-Manderscheid in 1787.
- Wilhelm Eugen von Schönborn (1765–1770), who died young.
- Marquard Wilhelm von Schönborn (1766–1769), who died young.

After the death of his first wife, he married Princess Marie Theresia of Colloredo (b. 1744) in 1776. The marriage remained childless.

Schönborn died on 25 July 1801 in Vienna. Since both of his sons died as children and his daughters could not inherit, the estates fell to the older, or Franconian line, whose founder was Count Rudolph Franz Erwein.
