= Johann Friedrich Karl von Ostein =

- Archbishop of Mainz
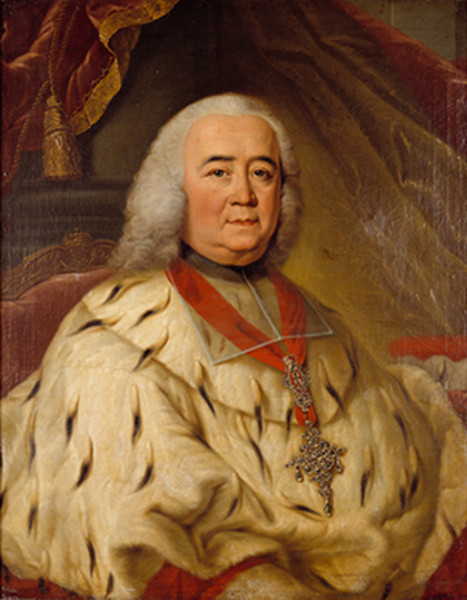
- Portrait by Heinrich Carl Brandt
- Church: Catholic Church
- Diocese: Electorate of Mainz
- In office: 1743–1763

Personal details
- Born: 6 July 1689
- Died: 4 June 1763 (aged 73)

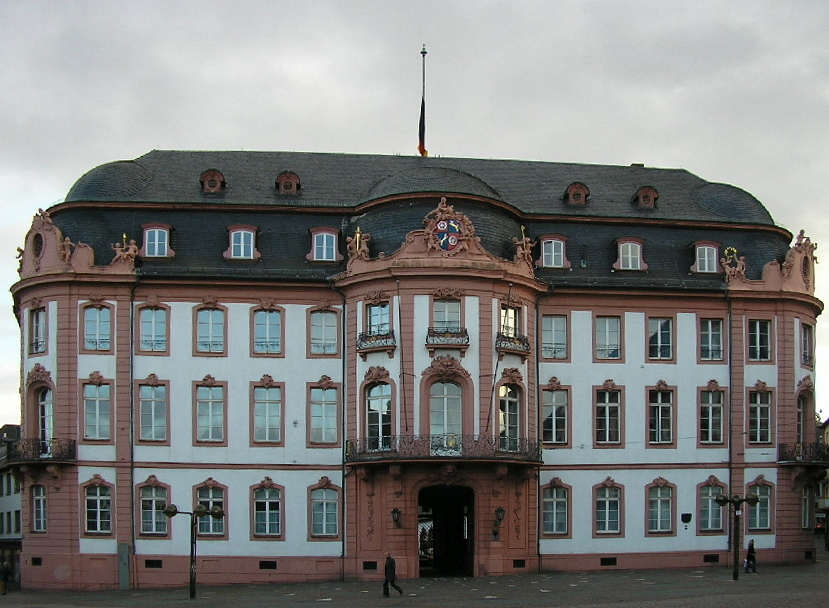
Osteiner Hof on Schillerplatz in Mainz

Johann Friedrich Karl von Ostein (6 July 1689 – 4 June 1763) was the Archbishop of Mainz, Elector of Mainz and Prince-Bishop of Worms.

== Early life ==
He was born as the eldest son of Count Johann Franz Sebastian von Ostein (1652-1718) and his wife, Countess Anna Karolina Maria von Schönborn (1671-1746). Among his siblings were Johann Franz Heinrich Carl von Ostein, Austrian Ambassador to England and Russia.

One of his ancestors was Johann Heinrich von Ostein, Prince-Bishop of Basel during the Thirty Years' War. His maternal grandparents were Count Melchior Friedrich von Schönborn-Buchheim and Baroness Maria Anna Sophia Johanna von Boyneburg-Lengsfeld (a daughter of Johann Christian von Boyneburg). Among his maternal family were uncles, Johann Philipp Franz von Schönborn, the Prince-Bishop of Würzburg, Friedrich Karl von Schönborn-Buchheim, the Prince-Bishop of Würzburg and Prince-Bishop of Bamberg who served as Vice-Chancellor of the Holy Roman Empire under Joseph I, Damian Hugo Philipp von Schönborn-Buchheim, the Prince-Bishop of Speyer and Bishop of Konstanz, Rudolf Franz Erwein von Schönborn, a diplomat and composer, Anselm Franz von Schönborn, and Franz Georg von Schönborn, the Elector and Archbishop of Trier who was also Prince-Bishop of Worms and Prince-Provost of Ellwangen.

== Career ==
On 22 April 1743, he was selected as a compromise candidate for Archbishop. His rule was overshadowed by the War of the Austrian Succession, Seven Years' War and subsequent peace treaty. Having supported the losing side in the Seven Years' War, the cost of reparations bankrupted Mainz.

A new mansion, Osteiner Hof was built along the Diethmarkt, now Schillerplatz, as his principal residence. The town experienced at Osteins time big changes. The electoral palace was largely completed in 1752.

In addition, the new buildings of St. Peter's and the Jesuit church were built, as well as the Bassenheimer Hof on Diethmarkt.

== Personal life ==
Johann Friedrich Karl died on 4 June 1763 and was buried in Mainz Cathedral.

Catholic Church titles
Regnal titles
Preceded by Philipp Karl von Eltz-Kempenich	Archbishop-Elector of Mainz; 1743-1763	Succeeded by Emmerich Joseph von Breidbach zu Bürresheim
Preceded by Franz Georg von Schönborn-Buchheim	Prince-Bishop of Worms; 1756-1763	Succeeded by Johann IX Philipp von Walderdorff
