= Anselm Franz von Schönborn-Heusenstamm =

Anselm Franz von Schönborn
- Count of Schönborn-Heusenstamm
- Born: 5 January 1681; Mainz
- Died: 10 August 1726 (aged 45); Mainz
- Spouse: Maria Theresia von Montfort-Tettnang
- Issue: Eugen Erwein von Schönborn-Heusenstamm
- House: Schönborn-Heusenstamm
- Father: Melchior Friedrich Graf von Schönborn-Buchheim
- Mother: Maria Anna Sophia Johanna von Boineburg-Lengsfeld

Anselm Franz, Graf von Schönborn-Heusenstamm (5 January 1681 – 10 August 1726) was a German landowner and aristocrat.

== Early life ==
Schönborn was born on 5 January 1681 in Mainz. He was a younger son of Melchior Friedrich von Schönborn-Buchheim (1644–1717), a Minister of State of the Electorate of Mainz, and his wife, Baroness Maria Anna Sophia Johanna von Boineburg-Lengsfeld (1652–1726). Among his brothers were the Prince-Bishops of Würzburg Johann Philipp Franz von Schönborn, Friedrich Karl von Schönborn-Buchheim (who served as Vice-Chancellor of the Holy Roman Empire under Joseph I from 1705 to 1734), and Prince-Bishop of Speyer Damian Hugo Philipp von Schönborn-Buchheim, as well as the diplomat and composer Rudolf Franz Erwein von Schönborn and the Elector and Archbishop of Trier, Franz Georg von Schönborn.

His paternal grandfather was Baron Philipp Erwein von Schönborn and his uncle was Lothar Franz von Schönborn, the Archbishop-Elector of Mainz and Bishop of Bamberg, who is known today for commissioning a number of Baroque buildings, such as the palace Schloss Weissenstein. His maternal grandfather was Baron Johann Christian von Boyneburg.

== Career ==
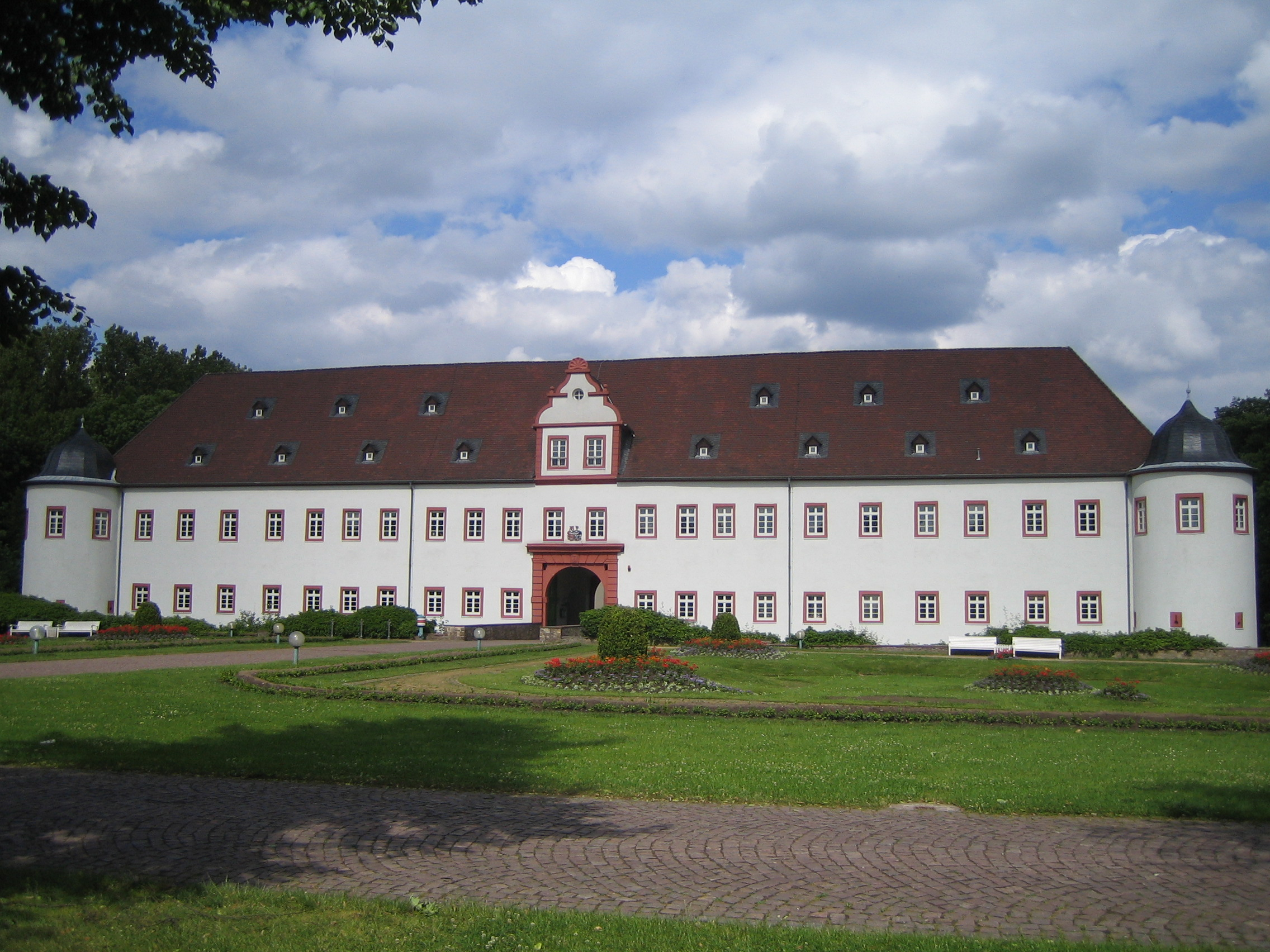
Heusenstamm Castle, built in 1661 for Baron Philipp Erwein von Schönborn

As his father became increasingly wealthy, especially in the Aschaffenburg area, he gave up his previous residence in Schönborn Castle in Heusenstamm, which had been built by his father, Baron Philipp Erwein von Schönborn, in favor of Anselm Franz. Established as a German statelet in 1717, the County of Schönborn-Heusenstamm was a partition of Schönborn, in the south of modern Hesse, Germany.

== Personal life ==
Schönborn was married to Countess Maria Theresia von Montfort (1698–1751), a daughter of Count Anton III von Montfort-Pfannberg and Countess Maria Anna Leopoldine von Thun und Hohenstein. Together, they were the parents of one son:

- Eugen Erwein von Schönborn-Heusenstamm (1727–1801), who married Princess Elisabeth Josepha zu Salm-Salm, a daughter of Prince Nikolaus Leopold zu Salm-Salm.

Schönborn died on 10 August 1726 in Mainz before his son and heir, Eugen Erwein, was born there on 17 January 1727. After his son's death in 1801, the Heusenstamm property passed into the hands of the Wiesentheid branch of the family.
