= Philipp Erwein von Schönborn =

German nobleman

Philipp Erwein, Freiherr von Schönborn zu Freienfels-Eschbach (1607 – 4 November 1668), was a German nobleman who is considered the founder of the economic success of the Counts of Schönborn.

== Early life ==
Philipp Erwein was born in Eschbach, Südliche Weinstraße, in 1607. He was a son of Maria Barbara von der Leyen and Georg von Schönborn (d. 1613), who served as Bailiff (Viscount) of the Protestant County of Wied-Runkel in 1605. The family lived in a manor house at Laubuseschbach (present-day Hesse). Among his siblings were elder brother, Johann Philipp von Schönborn, a mediator during the Peace of Westphalia negotiations (that ended the Thirty Years' War) which led to his election as the Archbishop of Mainz, and sister, Agatha Maria von Schönborn, wife of Georg Anton Waldbott von Bassenheim.

The Schönborn family had knightly rank and was first mentioned in 1275. However, by the time Philipp Erwein and his brother Johann Philipp grew up, most branches of the family had extinguished. In 1640, the brothers were bequeathed a sizeable fortune by their cousin, Friedrich Georg von Schönborn, a money lender to the Archbishop of Mainz and "Senior of the diocese of Mainz".

== Career ==
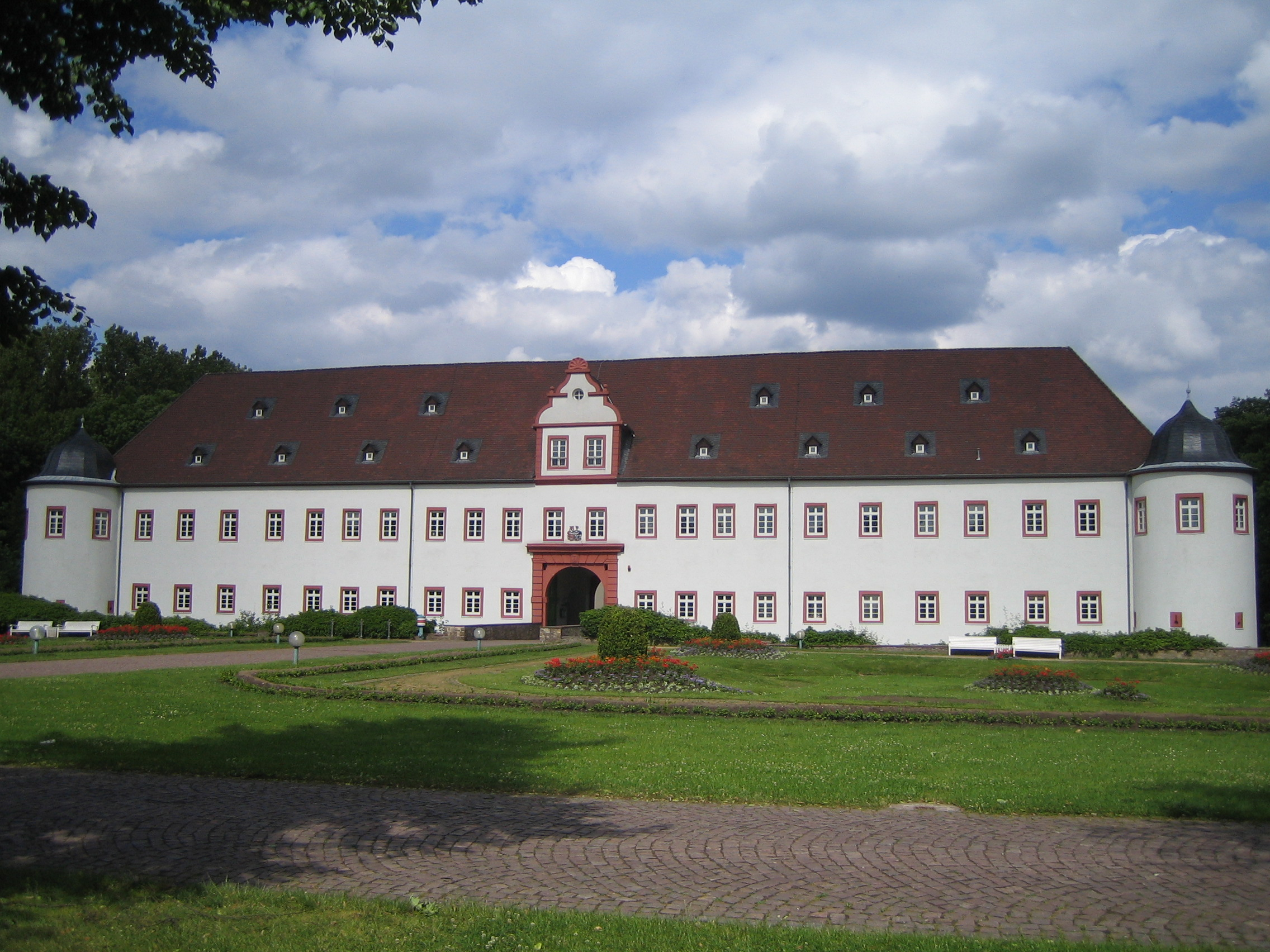
Heusenstamm Castle

His brother, Johann Philipp, appointed him as the Electorate of Mainz's chief magistrate at Steinheim, as the Hereditary Cupbearer of the Archbishopric of Mainz and as the Hereditary Cupbearer of the Bishopric of Würzburg. Emperor Leopold I granted him, and all his descendants, the title of noble standard-bearer (German: Bannerherr) and made him a Freiherr (Baron) of the Empire. At the same time, he was granted the great palatine title and extensive privileges. He also bore the titles of Imperial Court Councillor and Privy Councillor of the Electorate of Mainz.

In 1650, he acquired the town of Gaibach, including Schloss Gaibach and the right of patronage over the local parish church. In 1657, he was recorded as the owner of the House of Stone (German: Haus zum Stein), the oldest preserved and inhabited building in Mainz.

He was Burgrave of Frauenstein Castle until 1662. On 30 August 1661, Philipp Erwein received the feudal charter for the Court of Blood Justice in Heusenstamm from Emperor Leopold. Between 1663 and 1668, he built Heusenstamm Castle in front of the moated castle of the former Lords of Heusenstamm. Through inheritance, purchase and fiefdom, he also acquired land and property on both sides of the Rhine, on the Main, in the Taunus and the Wetterau.

== Personal life ==
In 1635, he was married to Baroness Maria Ursula von Greiffenclau-Vollraths (d. 1682), a daughter of Baron Heinrich von Greiffenclau-Volrads and Anna Maria von und zu Eltz. Together, they were the parents of twelve children, including:

- Maria Ursula von Schönborn (1636–1677), who married Baron Heinrich Fredrich Wambold von Umstadt.
- Anna Margareta von Schönborn (1637–1676), who married Baron Wolfgang Heinrich von Metternich-Burscheid, brother of Lothar Friedrich von Metternich-Burscheid was Elector of Mainz.
- Franz Georg von Schönborn (1639–1674), the Canon of Mainz.
- Johann Philipp von Schönborn (1642–1703), a Knight of St. John and Imperial General.
- Melchior Friedrich von Schönborn-Buchheim (1644–1717), who married Baroness Maria Anna Sophia Johanna von Boyneburg-Lengsfeld, a daughter of Johann Christian von Boyneburg.
- Maria Clara von Schönborn (1647–c. 1716), who married Baron Friedrich Dietrich Kämmerer von Worms von Dalberg.
- Anna Barbara von Schönborn (1648–1721), who married, as his second wife, Count Ludwig Gustaf zu Hohenlohe-Waldenburg-Schillingsfürst.
- Eva Rosina von Schönborn (1650–c. 1715), who married Baron Wolfgang Dietrich Truchsess von Wetzhausen.
- Katharina Elisabeth von Schönborn (1652–1707), who married Count Heinrich von Hatzfeld-Gleichen, the brother of Count zu Hohenlohe-Waldenburg-Schillingsfürst's first wife, Maria Eleanore von Hatzfeld (niece and nephew of Count Melchior von Hatzfeldt and Prince-Bishop Franz von Hatzfeld).
- Johann Erwein von Schönborn (1654–1705), Mainz Privy Councillor and Lord of Reichelsberg.
- Lothar Franz von Schönborn (1655–1729), who became the Prince-Bishop of Bamberg and Archbishop of Mainz; he constructed the baroque palace known as Schloss Weißenstein.

Philipp Erwein died in Geisenheim on 4 November 1668. His tomb in the parish church of Geisenheim was reportedly created by Matthias Rauchmiller. He was succeeded by his son, Johann Erwein, who was only 14 years old at the time of his death. When Johann Erwein died in 1705, he was succeeded by his elder brother, Melchior Friedrich.

=== Descendants ===
Through his son Melchior Friedrich, he was a grandfather of seven grandsons, among whom were "four reigning Bishops, including one who became Vice-Chancellor of the Empire, and one who was a Cardinal, an Imperial general, a Count of Wiesentheid, and a pluralist who held prebends in four cathedral chapters." They were: Johann Philipp Franz von Schönborn, the Prince-Bishop of Würzburg; Friedrich Karl von Schönborn-Buchheim, the Prince-Bishop of Würzburg and Prince-Bishop of Bamberg who served as Vice-Chancellor of the Holy Roman Empire under Joseph I; Damian Hugo Philipp von Schönborn-Buchheim, the Prince-Bishop of Speyer and Bishop of Konstanz; Rudolf Franz Erwein von Schönborn, a diplomat and composer; and Franz Georg von Schönborn, the Elector and Archbishop of Trier who was also Prince-Bishop of Worms and Prince-Provost of Ellwangen.
