= Melchior Friedrich von Schönborn-Buchheim =

German politician

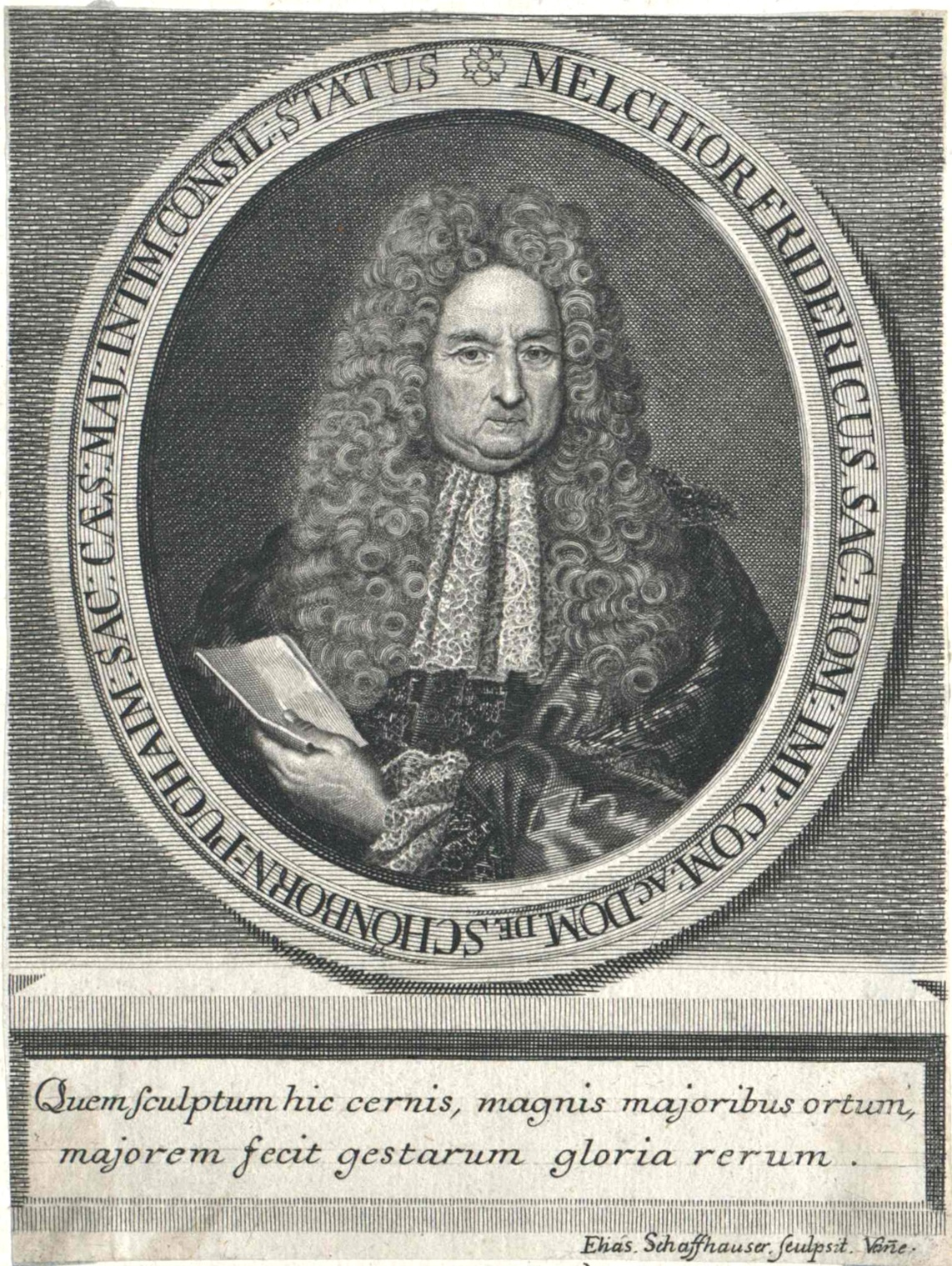
Engraving of Melchior Friedrich von Schönborn-Buchheim

Melchior Friedrich, Count of Schönborn-Buchheim (16 March 1644 – 19 May 1717), was a German politician who served as a Minister of State of the Electorate of Mainz. After his death, four of his sons became German Prince-Bishops.

== Early life ==
He was born in Steinheim on 16 March 1644 as the son of Baron Philipp Erwein von Schönborn (1607–1668) and Maria Ursula von Greiffenclau-Vollraths. His younger brother, Lothar Franz von Schönborn, was the Archbishop-Elector of Mainz and Prince-Bishop of Bamberg, who is known best today for commissioning a number of Baroque buildings, such as the palace Schloss Weissenstein.

His father, the Bailiff of the Electorate of Mainz, was the only brother of Johann Philipp von Schönborn, Archbishop of Mainz from 1647 until 1673. Through his mother, he was a grand nephew of Georg Friedrich von Greiffenklau, the Elector and Archbishop of Mainz from 1626 until 1629. His uncle had appointed his father as Bailiff in Steinheim and then granted him offices and titles, including Hereditary Cupbearer of the Archbishopric of Mainz and Hereditary Cupbearer of the Bishopric of Würzburg.

== Career ==
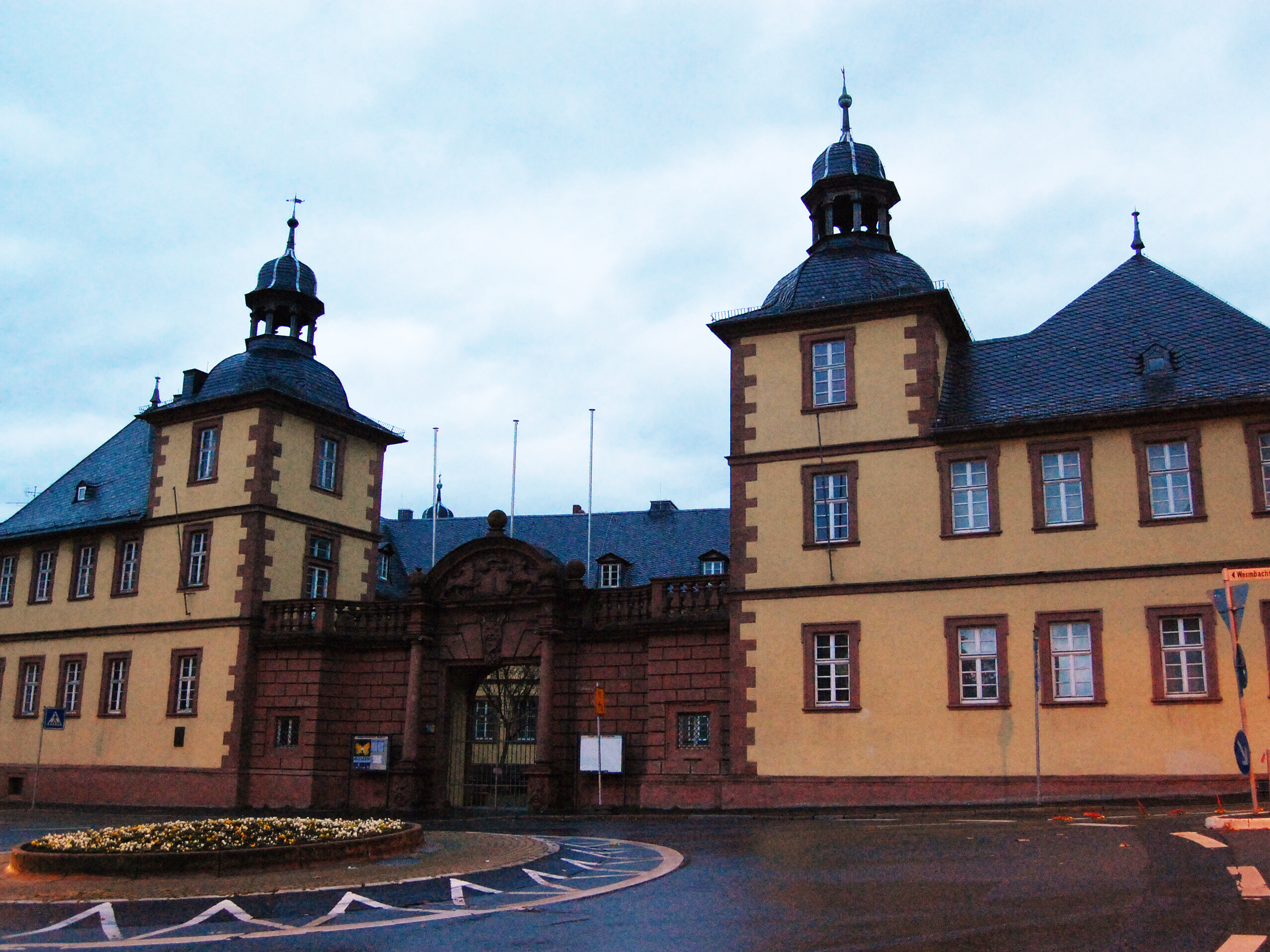
Schönborner Hof (Aschaffenburg), built 1673–1681

In 1654, his father had acquired the noble residence of the Stockheim family in Geisenheim, dating back to 1550, which later became known as Schönborn Castle. He had also bought the Count of Heusenstamm's estate 1661. The old castle had been partially destroyed in the Thirty Years' War, so his father restored it between 1663 and 1668 in the Renaissance style. In 1671, Melchior acquired the fief of Reichelsberg (near Aub) from the Prince-Bishop of Würzburg, giving him access to the Franconian Circle of the Imperial Knights. As heir, and in keeping with his status, he was appointed Imperial Count on 5 August 1701, then also in Mainz, the seat of his brother, the ruling Elector and Archbishop, arranged for the construction of the Schönborner Hof in Mainz from 1668 to 1670, although he did not live to see its completion.

The Schönborner Hof in Aschaffenburg, a city palace, was built from 1673 to 1681 as the Aschaffenburg residence for the Mainz High Court Marshal and Vice-Dominion Melchior Freiherr von Schönborn and his wife Sophia Maria Anna. It was built according to the designs of the Mainz Capuchin Father Matthias von Saarburg. As Melchior Friedrich became increasingly wealthy, especially in the Aschaffenburg area, he gave up his previous residence in Schönborn Castle in Heusenstamm in favor of his son Anselm Franz, which had been built by his father Philipp Erwein von Schönborn.

=== Schönborn-Buchheim ===
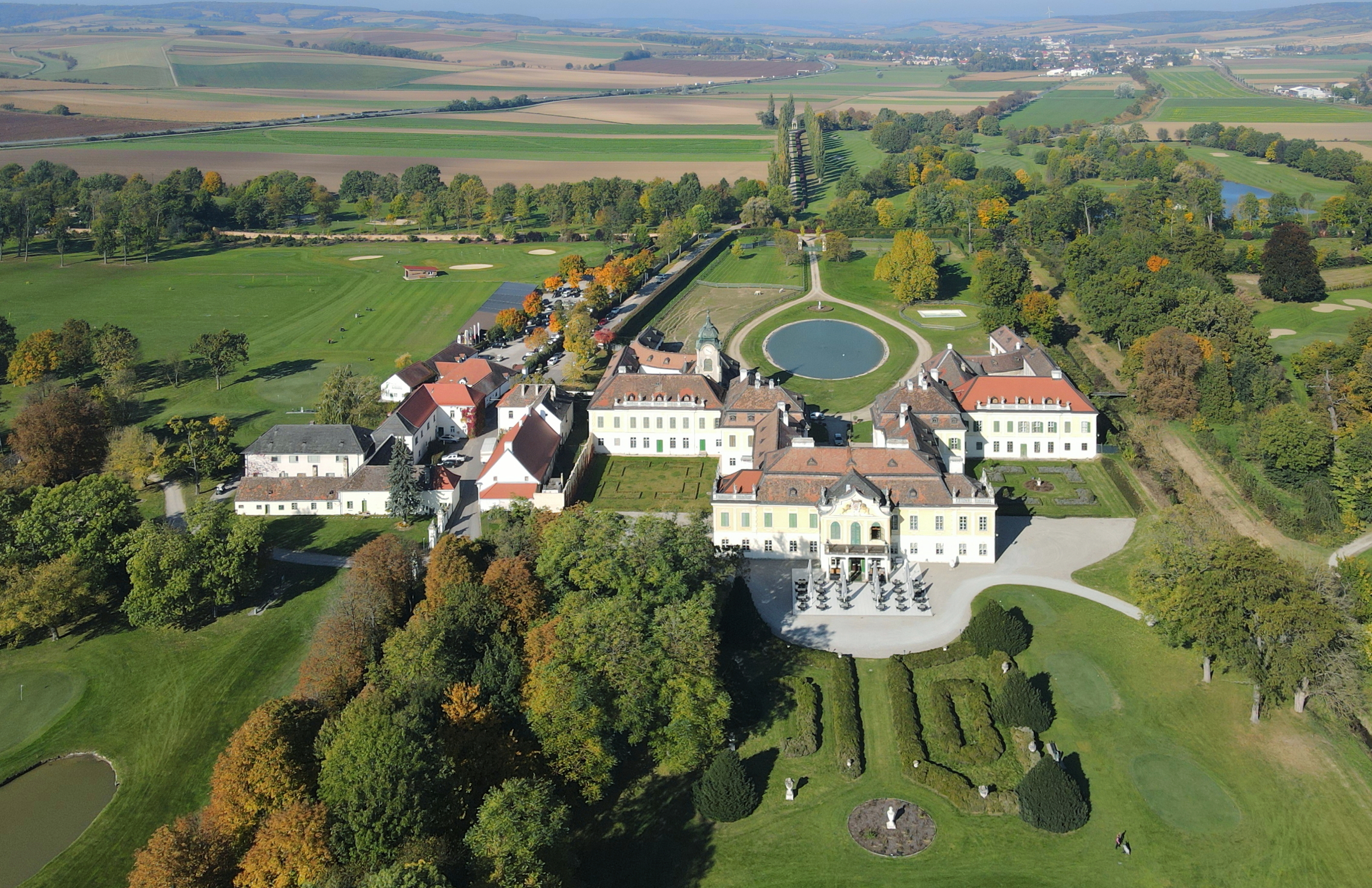
Göllersdorf Castle, Lower Austria (owned by the Schönborn family since 1712)

In 1710, Schönborn bought the estates of Göllersdorf, Mühlberg and Aspersdorf in Lower Austria from the last Count of Puchheim, Franz Anton von Bucheim, the then Bishop of Wiener Neustadt. The purchase meant entry into the Austrian nobility. The seller then called himself Puchheim-Schönborn, and the buyer's family called themselves Schönborn-Puchheim, later Schönborn-Buchheim. The father, Melchior Friedrich, Count of Schönborn, was also awarded the Austrian title of Count.

The existing castle in Göllersdorf, in Weinviertel, was cleared after the construction of the new Schloss Schönborn and later sold; today the Republic of Austria operates the Göllersdorf correctional facility on the castle grounds. From 1711 to 1718, shortly after the purchase, Melchior Friedrich commissioned the architect Johann Lukas von Hildebrandt to convert the Mihlberg Fortress, which was located on the property, into a representative country castle. A three-wing complex with an extensive garden, orangery and castle chapel was built to the southeast of the town. Between 1729 and 1733, Hildebrand built a monumental St. John Nepomuk Chapel on the northwest edge of the extensive castle park . The castle is still owned by the family. A golf course was opened in the castle park in 1989 and has won international awards. Two thirds of the complex is located on the castle park grounds and blends harmoniously into the historic park. The Schloss Schönborn Golf Club uses the castle as a clubhouse for the golf course.

In 1715, his son, the Imperial Vice-Chancellor Friedrich Karl, also acquired the nearby Weyerburg estate in Lower Austria, about 10 km east of Hollabrunn, from the estate of Baron Dominikus von Hochburg.

== Personal life ==
Schönborn-Buchheim was married to Baroness Maria Anna Sophia Johanna von Boyneburg-Lengsfeld (1652–1726), daughter of Johann Christian von Boyneburg and Anna Christina Schütz von Holzhausen. Together, they were the parents of eighteen children, four of whom died young, including:

- Maria Anna von Schönborn (1669–1703), who married Count Johann Philipp von Stadion-Warthausen und Thannhausen.
- Maria Sophie von Schönborn (1670–1742), who married Count Karl Kasper von der Leyen und zu Hohengeroldseck.
- Anna Karolina Maria von Schönborn (1671–1746), who married Count Johann Franz Sebastian von Ostein.
- Johann Philipp Franz von Schönborn (1673–1724), the Prince-Bishop of Würzburg from 1719 to 1724.
- Friedrich Karl von Schönborn-Buchheim (1674–1746), the Prince-Bishop of Würzburg and Prince-Bishop of Bamberg from 1729 to 1746, who served as Vice-Chancellor of the Holy Roman Empire under Joseph I from 1705 to 1734.
- Damian Hugo Philipp von Schönborn-Buchheim (1676–1743), the Prince-Bishop of Speyer and Bishop of Konstanz.
- Rudolf Franz Erwein von Schönborn (1677–1754), a diplomat and composer who married Countess Maria Eleonore von Dernbach (née Countess von Hatzfeld-Wildenburg), in 1701.
- Anselm Franz von Schönborn (1681–1726), who married Maria Theresia von Montfort-Tettnang.
- Franz Georg von Schönborn (1682–1756), the Elector and Archbishop of Trier who was also Prince-Bishop of Worms and Prince-Provost of Ellwangen.
- Anna Maria Philippina von Schönborn (1685–1721), who married Count Maximilian Franz von Seinsheim.
- Amalia Anna Elisabeth von Schönborn (1686–1757), who married Otto Leopold of Limburg Stirum.
- Johanna Eleonora Maria von Schönborn (1688–1763), who married Count Kraft Anton Wilhelm von Oettingen-Baldern.
- Katharina Elisabeth von Schönborn (1692–1777), who married Count Franz Wenzel von Nostitz-Rieneck.

Count von Schönborn died on 19 May 1717 in Frankfurt am Main.

=== Descendants ===
Through his daughter Anna Karolina Maria, he was a grandfather of diplomat Johann Franz Heinrich Carl von Ostein and Johann Friedrich Karl von Ostein, the Archbishop of Mainz, Elector of Mainz, and Prince-Bishop of Worms.

Through his daughter Amalia Anna Elisabeth, he was a grandfather of Friedrich Karl of Limburg Stirum and August Philip of Limburg Stirum, the Prince-Bishop of Speyer.

Through his daughter Anna Maria, he was a grandfather of Adam Friedrich von Seinsheim, the Prince-Bishop of Würzburg from 1755 to 1779 and Prince-Bishop of Bamberg from 1757 to 1779.
