= Rudolf Franz Erwein von Schönborn =

- Count of Schönborn-Wiesentheid
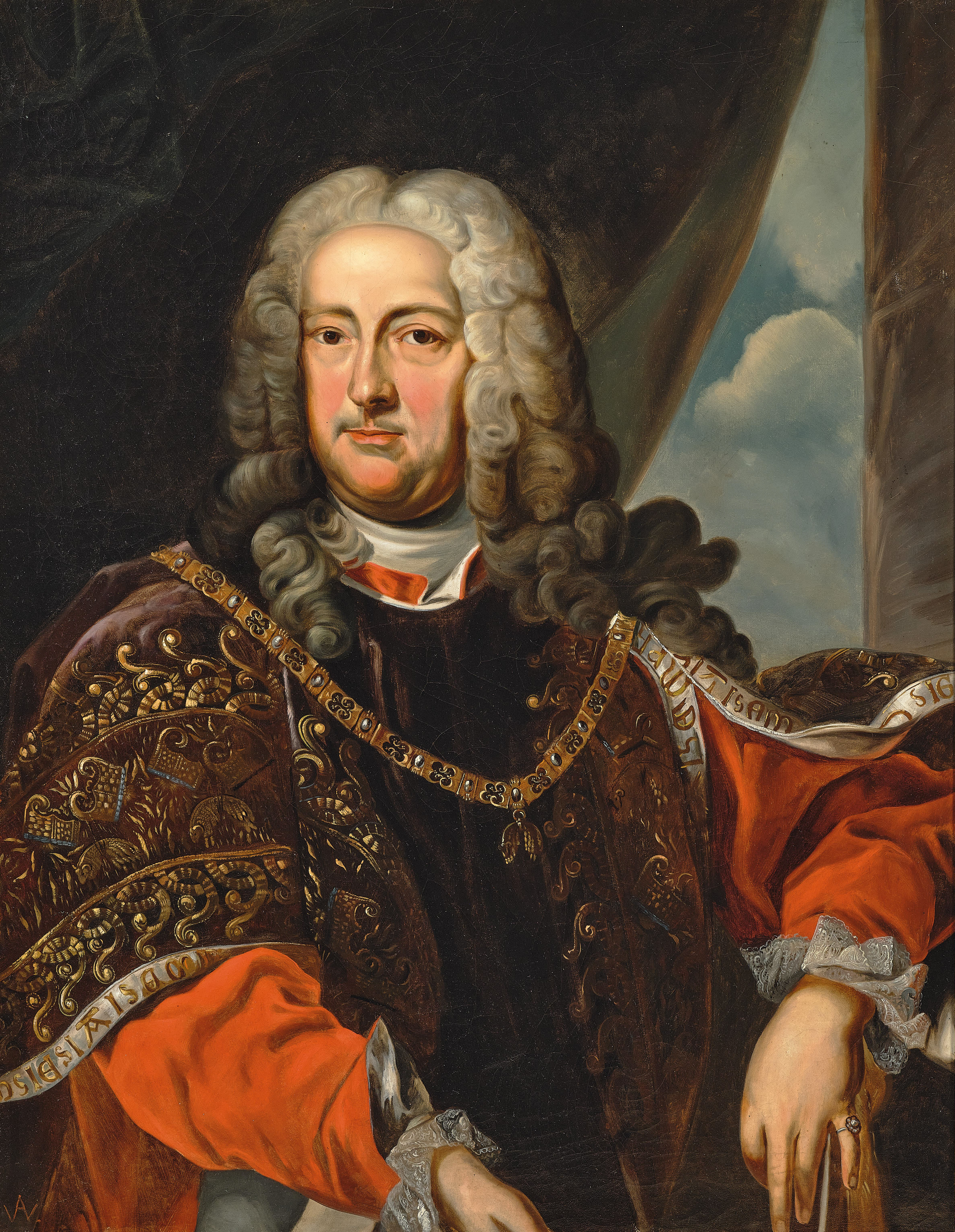
- Portrait of von Schönborn, c. 1740
- Born: 23 October 1677; Mainz
- Died: 22 September 1754 (aged 76); Gaibach
- Spouse: Maria Eleonore von Hatzfeld-Wildenburg (m. 1701; died 1718)
- Issue: Anna Sophia von Schönborn; Joseph Franz Bonaventura von Schönborn
- House: Schönborn
- Father: Melchior Friedrich von Schönborn-Buchheim
- Mother: Maria Anna Sophia von Boineburg-Lengsfeld

Count Rudolf Franz Erwein von Schönborn (23 October 1677 – 22 September 1754), was a German politician and diplomat who was also active as a composer and a Knight of the Order of the Golden Fleece.

== Early life ==
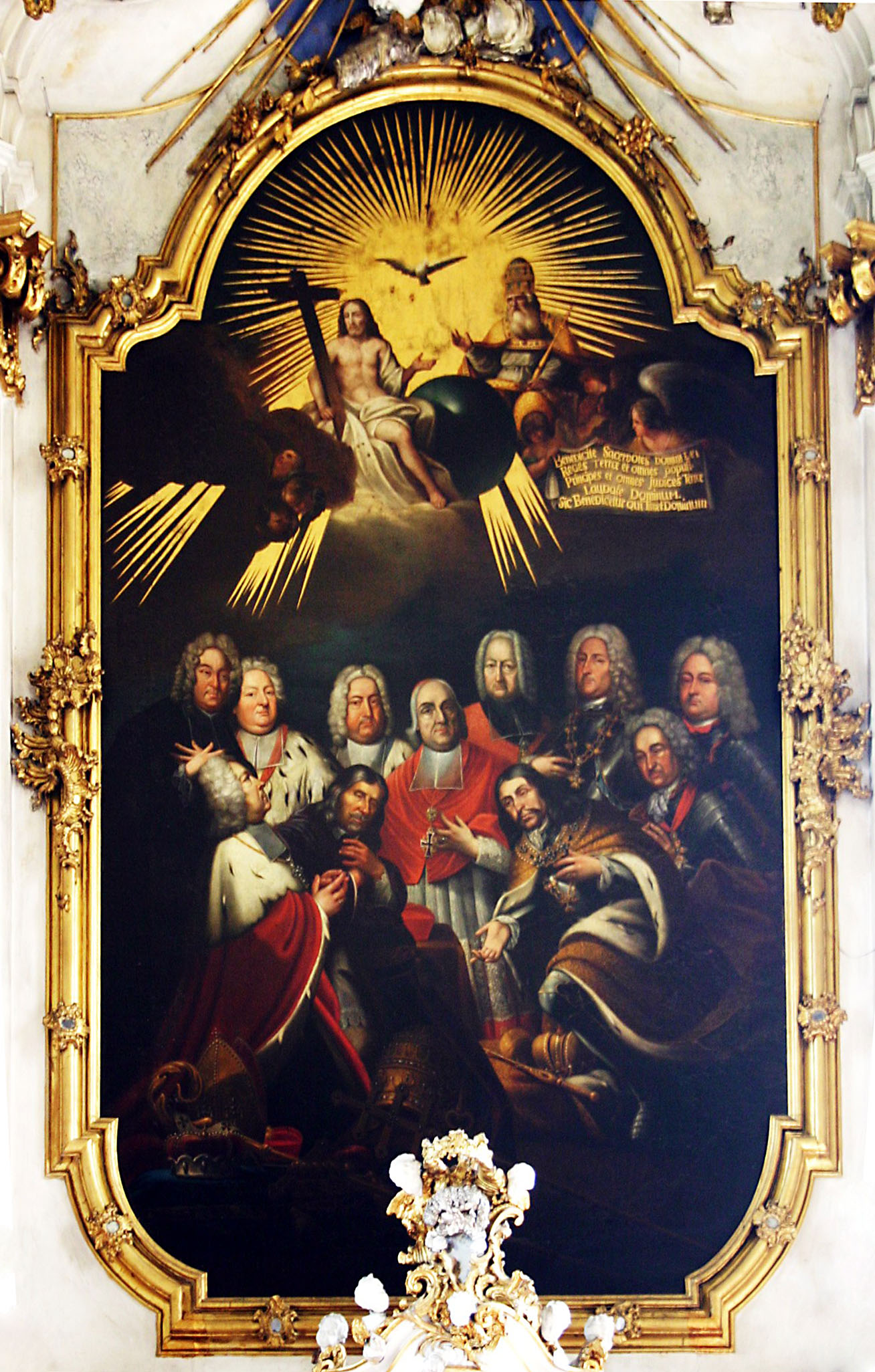
Altarpiece in Gaibach parish church, c. 1745, showing three generations of the Schönborn family, including Rudolf Franz Erwein (2nd in front)

Schönborn was born on 23 October 1677 in Mainz. He was a younger son of Melchior Friedrich Graf von Schönborn-Buchheim (1644–1717), a Minister of State of the Electorate of Mainz, and his wife, Baroness Maria Anna Sophia Johanna von Boineburg-Lengsfeld (1652–1726). Among his brothers were the Prince-Bishops of Würzburg Johann Philipp Franz von Schönborn, Friedrich Karl von Schönborn-Buchheim (who served as Vice-Chancellor of the Holy Roman Empire under Joseph I from 1705 to 1734), and Prince-Bishop of Speyer Damian Hugo Philipp von Schönborn-Buchheim, as well as the Elector and Archbishop of Trier, Franz Georg von Schönborn. His uncle was Lothar Franz von Schönborn, the Archbishop-Elector of Mainz and Bishop of Bamberg, who is known today for commissioning a number of Baroque buildings, such as the palace Schloss Weissenstein.

Schönborn was initially taught by a private tutor before attending the Jesuit High School in Aschaffenburg and Würzburg. From 1693 to 1695, he attended the Collegium Germanicum in Rome and, from 1696 to 1698, studied at the University of Leiden and, in 1696, in Paris.

== Career ==
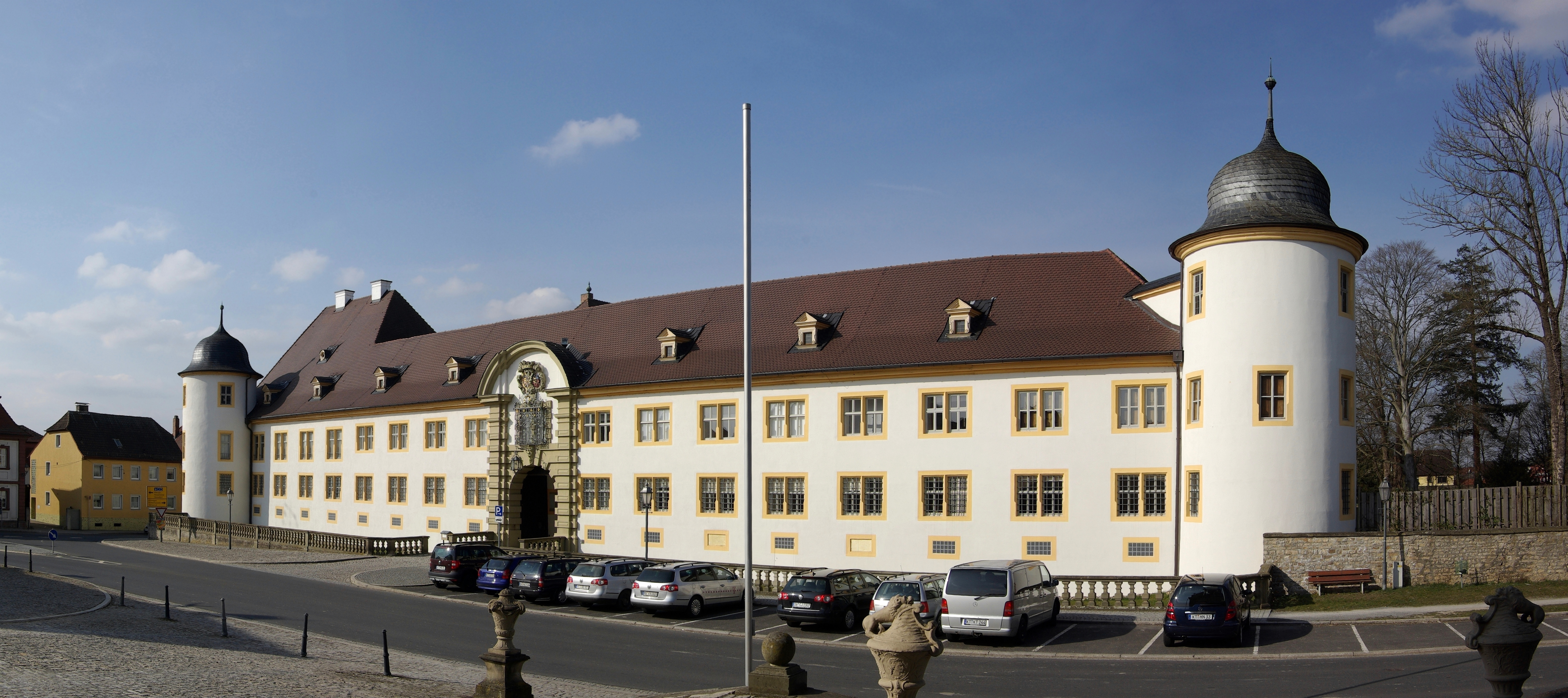
Wiesentheid Castle, built in 1701 by von Schönborn

Schönborn was a canon in Würzburg in 1689 and a canon in Trier from 1690 to 1697. In 1699, he travelled to Rome on a diplomatic mission for his uncle, Lothar Franz von Schönborn. From 1700 to 1701, he was at the Imperial Court in Vienna, from 1700 he was in the service of the Electorate of Mainz as Vidame of Aschaffenburg and, in 1701, he worked as an Imperial Chamberlain and Imperial Privy Councillor.

In 1704, he officially took over the rule of Wiesentheid, a small imperial state raised to a county, which came to him after marrying his wife in 1701. Thus, the family obtained imperial immediacy for the first time, and since the counts of Schönborn bear the prefix Illustrious Highness. Melchior bought additional estates in Austria in 1710, Göllersdorf with Mühlberg and Aspersdorf in Lower Austria, from the Counts of Buchheim. In 1717, his estate was partitioned into the states of Schönborn-Wiesentheid and Schönborn-Heusenstamm, both retaining immediacy. Heusenstamm was inherited by Schönborn-Wiesentheid in 1801. The state of Schönborn-Wiesentheid was mediatised in 1806.

In 1709, he became a Privy Councillor of the Electorate of Mainz and, in 1709, he became Lord Marshal of the Court. In 1710, he went to the court in Dresden as an ambassador. Emperor Charles VI made him a Knight of the Holy Roman Empire at his coronation in 1711, and awarded him the Privy Council in 1713, whereupon von Schönborn gave up his services to the Electorate of Mainz and was involved in the mediation of disputes between the council and the citizens of Frankfurt am Main until 1732. In 1731, he became a Knight of the Order of the Golden Fleece and ended his activity as Vidame of Aschaffenburg in 1733.

In November 1736, Schönborn was enfeoffed with the town of Eschelbronn by his brother, Bishop Damian Hugo Philipp von Schönborn-Buchheim.

=== Cultural impact ===
Schönborn was a talented amateur cellist who had ordered original cello compositions from various composers including Platti and Vivaldi. His collection of 17th–19th century musical manuscripts and prints, called the "Musical Collection of the Counts Schönborn-Wiesentheid", is held at Weissenstein Palace at Pommersfelden, which was built for his uncle, Lothar Franz von Schönborn, from 1711 to 1718, and today contains the largest private Baroque art collection in Germany. The collection is considered the "elder repertoire" and consists of 147 prints and 497 mss. Its contents are listed with RISM. The "younger repertoire" was acquired by Schönborn's grandson, Hugo Damian Erwein von Schönborn-Wiesentheid, and great-grandson Franz Erwein von Schönborn-Wiesentheid, and consists of 141 prints and 98 mss.

He was also known as a builder. When he took over the rule in Wiesentheid, he had extensive renovation work carried out on his new residence Wiesentheid Castle, and had the Waldenstein branch church built.

== Personal life ==
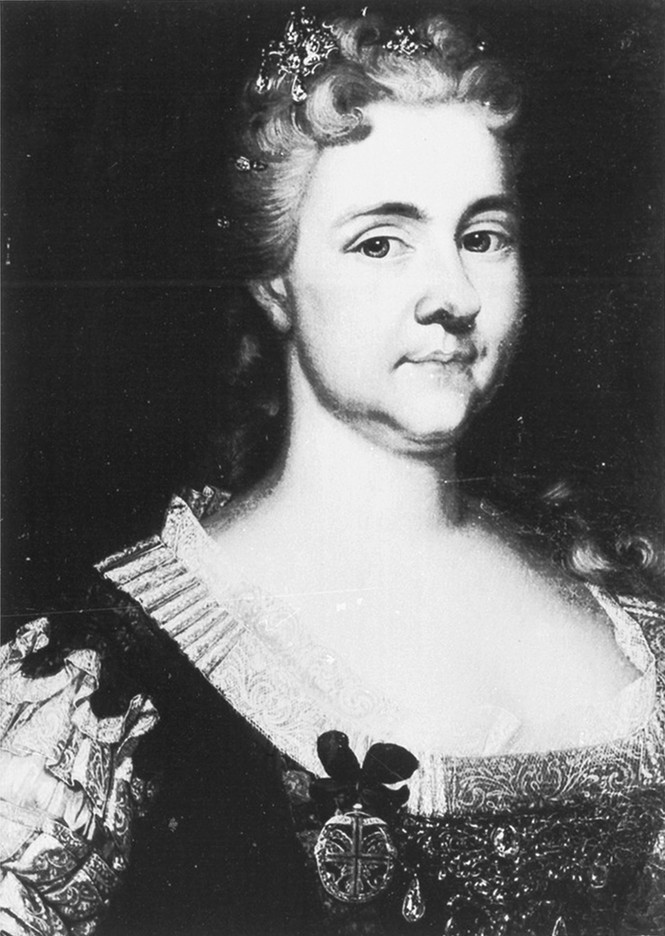
Portrait of Countess Maria Eleonore von Dernbach

On 14 November 1701, he married the widowed Countess Maria Eleonore von Dernbach (1680–1718), née Countess von Hatzfeld-Wildenburg, thus establishing the Schönborn-Wiesentheid line, and bringing the ownership of the Herrschaft (lordship) Wiesentheid in Franconia, the Austrian fiefs of Arnfels in Styria, and the Waldenstein lordship in Carinthia to the Schönborn family which the countess had inherited from her first husband. Her parents were Count Heinrich von Hatzfeld and Catharina Elisabetha von Schönborn. Together, they were the parents of seven daughters (five of whom died young and unmarried) and two sons, including:

- Anna Katharina von Schönborn (1703–1743), who married Marquis Franz Arnold von Hoensbroech.
- Eva Therese von Schönborn (1707–1794), who became the abbess of St. Anna in Würzburg.
- Joseph Franz Bonaventura von Schönborn (1708–1772), who married Countess Bernardine Plettenberg in 1736 and founded the Franconian line of the House of Schönborn.
- Melchior Friedrich Joseph von Schönborn (1711–1754), who became priest and provost of Saint Alban's Abbey outside Mainz.

Count von Schönborn died on 22 September 1754 in Gaibach.

=== Descendants ===
Through his daughter Anna, he was a grandfather of Philipp Damian von Hoensbroech, who became Bishop of Roermond.

Political offices
Preceded by Maria Eleonore von Dernbach	Count of Wiesentheid; 1704–1754	Succeeded by Joseph Franz Bonaventura von Schönborn
