= Hessenstein Castle =

Castle in Hesse, Germany

Coordinates: 51.1193°N 8.88588°E

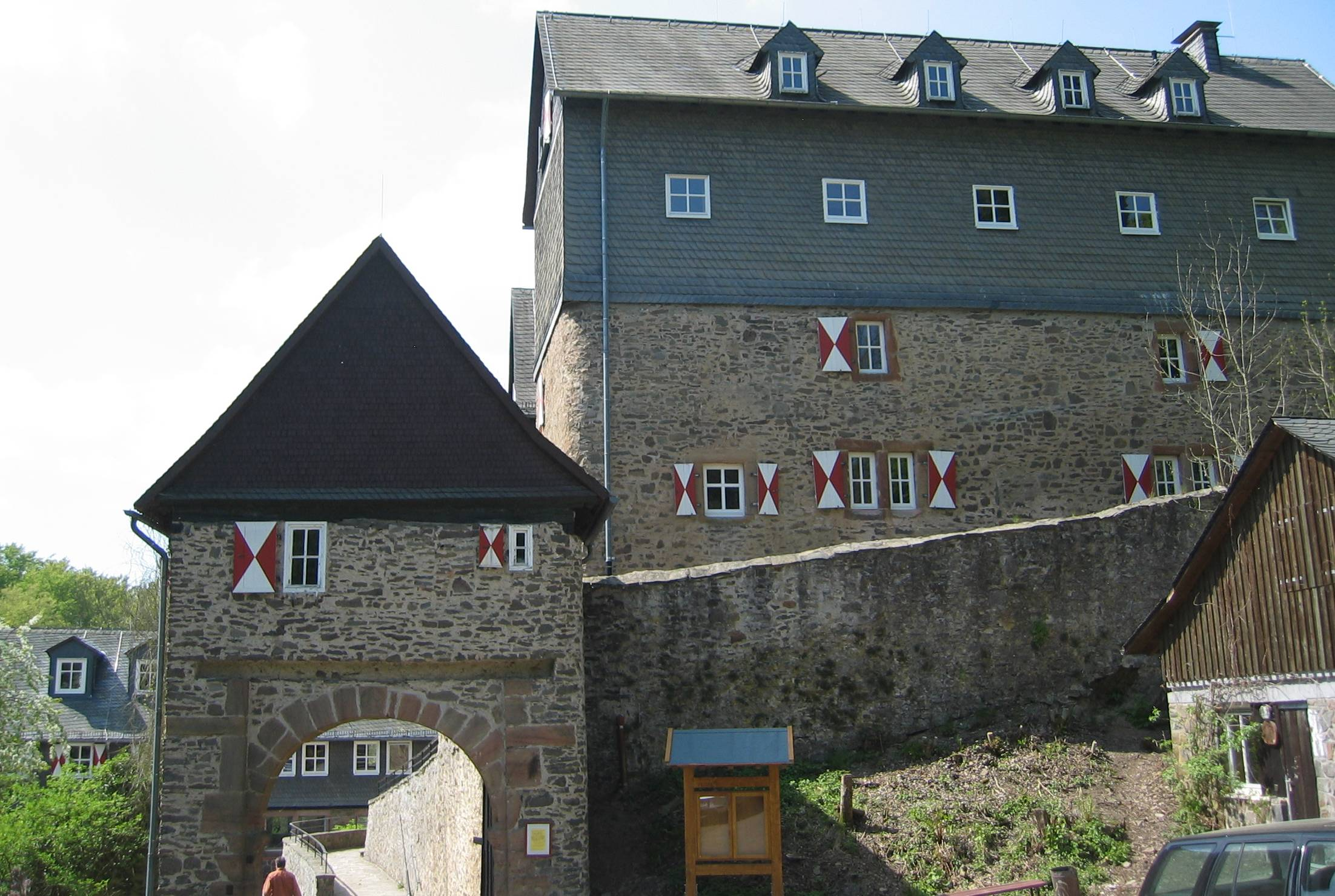
Hessenstein Castle

Hessenstein Castle (German: Burg Hessenstein) is a castle near Ederbringhausen in the town of Vöhl, located in the Waldeck-Frankenberg district of Hesse, Germany.

The castle is situated on the hill of the Keseberg, 327 m above sea level. It was constructed between 1328 and 1342. Today, it is used as a youth hotel and center for educational meetings for protection of environment, run by the Naturschutzbund Hessen (NABU) and other organisations.
