= Keseberg (hill) =

Hill in Hesse, Germany

Coordinates: 51°07′26″N 8°53′03″E

Highest point
- Elevation: 431.2 m (1,415 ft)

Geography
- Location: Landkreis Waldeck-Frankenberg, Hesse, Germany

The Keseberg is a hill in the county of Landkreis Waldeck-Frankenberg, Hesse, Germany.
