= Friedrich Karl von Schönborn =

- Prince-Bishop of Würzburg
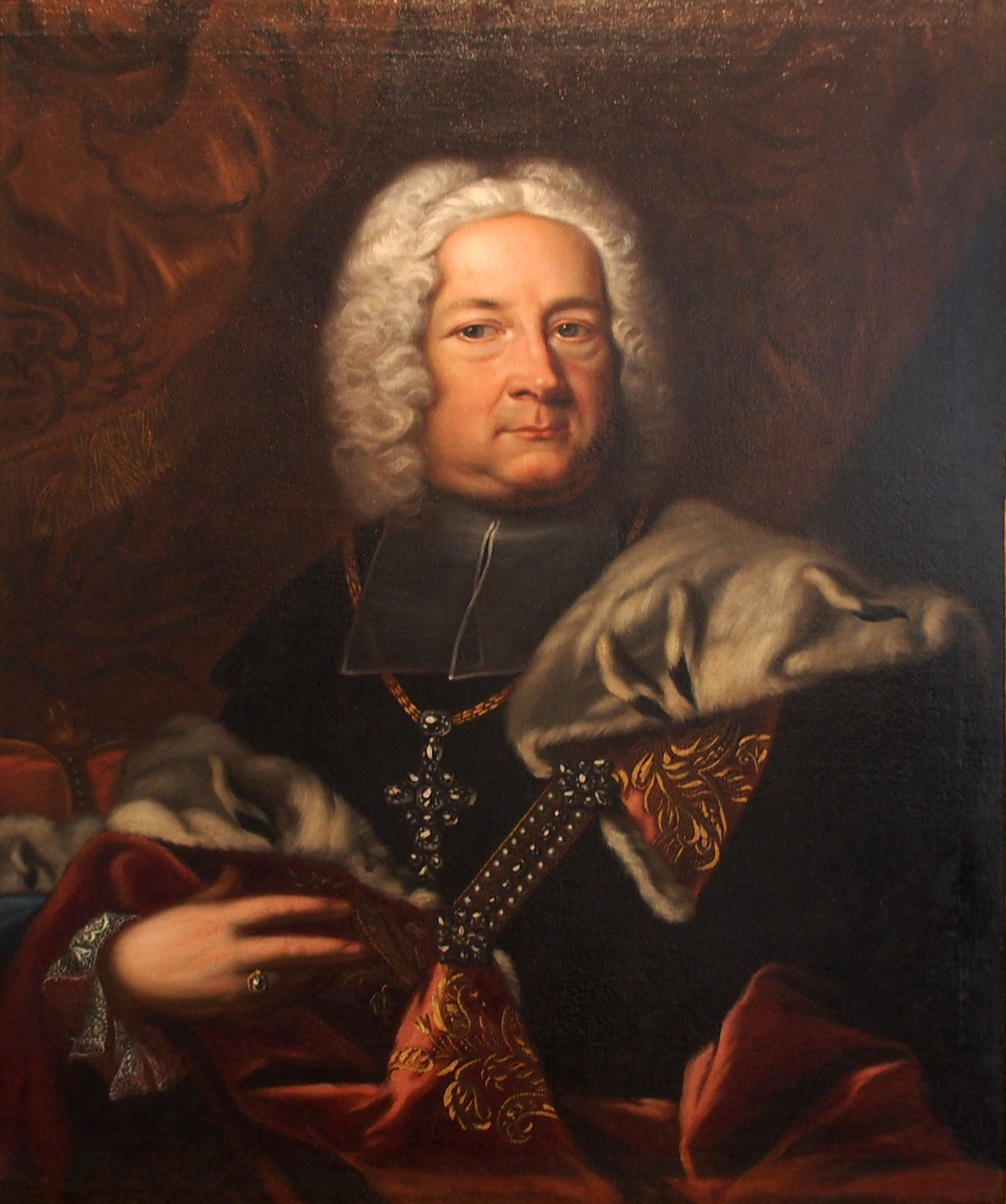
- Friedrich Karl von Schönborn, painting by Johann Gottfried Auerbach, 1730
- Church: Catholic Church
- Diocese: Diocese of Würzburg
- In office: 3 August 1729 – 26 July 1746
- Predecessor: Christoph Franz von Hutten
- Successor: Anselm Franz von Ingelheim
- Other post: Apostolic Administrator of Bamberg (1729-1746)
- Previous posts: Prince-Bishop of Bamberg (1729); Titular Bishop of Arcadiopolis in Asia (1710-1729); Coadjutor Bishop of Bamberg (1710-1729)

Orders
- Ordination: 10 June 1728
- Consecration: 20 June 1728 by Lothar Franz von Schönborn

Personal details
- Born: 3 March 1674 Mainz, Electorate of Mainz, Electoral Rhenish Circle, Holy Roman Empire
- Died: 26 July 1746 (aged 72) Würzburg, Prince-Bishopric of Würzburg, Franconian Circle, Holy Roman Empire

Friedrich Karl von Schönborn (or Friedrich Carl, 3 March 1674 – 26 July 1746) was the Prince-Bishop of Würzburg and Prince-Bishop of Bamberg from 1729 to 1746. He also served as Reichsvizekanzler (Vice-Chancellor) of the Holy Roman Empire from 1705 to 1734.

== Biography ==
Friedrich Karl (or Carl) von Schönborn was born in Mainz on 3 March 1674, the second son of Melchior Friedrich, Count of Schönborn-Buchheim (1644-1717, see List of rulers of Schönborn) and his wife, Maria Anna Sophia von Boineburg (1652–1726).

Friedrich Karl was the nephew of Lothar Franz von Schönborn, Archbishop-Elector of Mainz. Friedrich Karl's older brother Johann Philipp Franz von Schönborn was one of his predecessors as Prince-Bishop of Würzburg; his younger brother Damian Hugo Philipp von Schönborn became Prince-Bishop of Speyer and his youngest brother Franz Georg von Schönborn became Archbishop-Elector of Trier.

In 1681, he was sent to study at the Jesuit school at Aschaffenburg. He became a Canon (Priest) at Würzburg in 1683 and at Bamberg in 1685. He then studied alongside his brother Johann Philipp Franz at Würzburg, Mainz, Aschaffenburg and Rome (Germanicum). His Grand Tour brought him to the Netherlands, England and France. He finished his studies at the Sorbonne. He received the minor orders in 1701. In 1703/4, his uncle Lothar Franz sent him as envoy for the Archbishopric of Mainz to the imperial court at Vienna. He became a canon of Würzburg Cathedral in 1704, and a canon of Bamberg Cathedral in 1705.

In 1705, Friedrich Karl became Vice-Chancellor for Emperor Joseph I; he held this post under Joseph and his successor, Charles VI, until 1734. In this position, Friedrich Karl worked to protect the security of the smaller Imperial Estates, and to strengthen imperial authority. He successfully opposed attempts by Prussia to expand its influence in southern Germany. During his early years he spent most of his time at the Imperial court in Vienna. He had the Federal Chancellery of Austria built between 1717 and 1719 as his office. He also supervised the construction of the Imperial Chancellory Wing of the Hofburg Palace in Vienna (1723–30) by Lukas von Hildebrandt, where he lived in an apartment. As his private country resort near Vienna, he built the Blauer Hof Laxenburg (1710-1720) and also the Schönborn Palace near Göllersdorf in Lower Austria; there he also purchased Weyerburg Castle. In 1740 he acquired the Palais Schönborn-Batthyány and moved there.

He was appointed coadjutor bishop of Bamberg in 1708, with Pope Clement XI confirming his appointment on 19 May 1710. Friedrich Karl's opposition to the Pragmatic Sanction, as well as his frequent absences from Vienna, caused him to lose influence at the court after 1730.

When the cathedral chapter of Würzburg elected a new bishop in 1724, they rejected Friedrich Karl, due to the unpopularity of his brother Johann Philipp Franz. Christoph Franz von Hutten was elected Bishop of Würzburg instead. In 1724, Friedrich Karl became Dompropst at Würzburg and upon his uncle Lothar Franz' death on 30 January 1729, he succeeded as Prince-Bishop of Bamberg. On 18 May 1729 he was elected unanimously as Bishop of Würzburg, after von Hutten had died. Nonetheless he continued to mainly reside in Vienna for a number of years.

Friedrich Karl had been the favourite nephew of Lothar Franz, who bequeathed to him Schloss Weissenstein, a large Baroque palace at Pommersfelden. Among his various residences, Friedrich Karl clearly preferred Würzburg, however.

As an imperial prince, Friedrich Karl remained a supporter of the Habsburgs, despite numerous and significant political differences. His considered, moderately absolutist, rule served him well in reorganizing administration, finance and education in both bishoprics. In 1735 he helped to turn the Bamberger Akademie into a full university, by adding law and medical faculties. In 1743 he gave the University of Würzburg new study regulations.

He implemented the perpetual adoration at Würzburg in 1736. In both bishoprics he built or renovated numerous churches, often using Würzburg engineer Balthasar Neumann. Under him, Neumann also completed the Würzburg Residence (begun under his brother) and the Schönbornkapelle of Würzburg Cathedral. Friedrich Karl also had Neumann build a new summer residence at Werneck.

He died on 26 July 1746 at Würzburg and is buried in the Schönbornkapelle of Würzburg Cathedral.

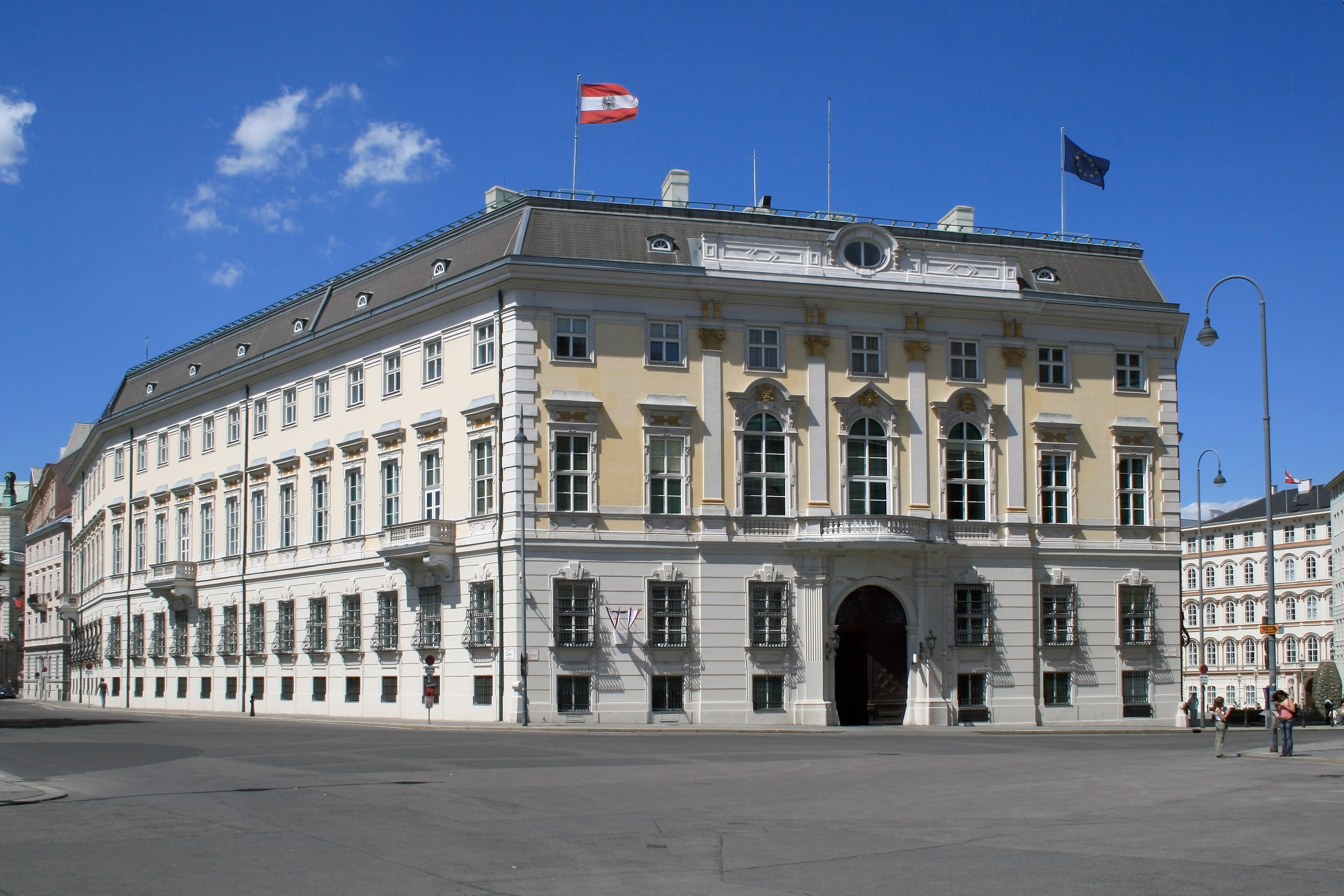
Federal Chancellery of Austria

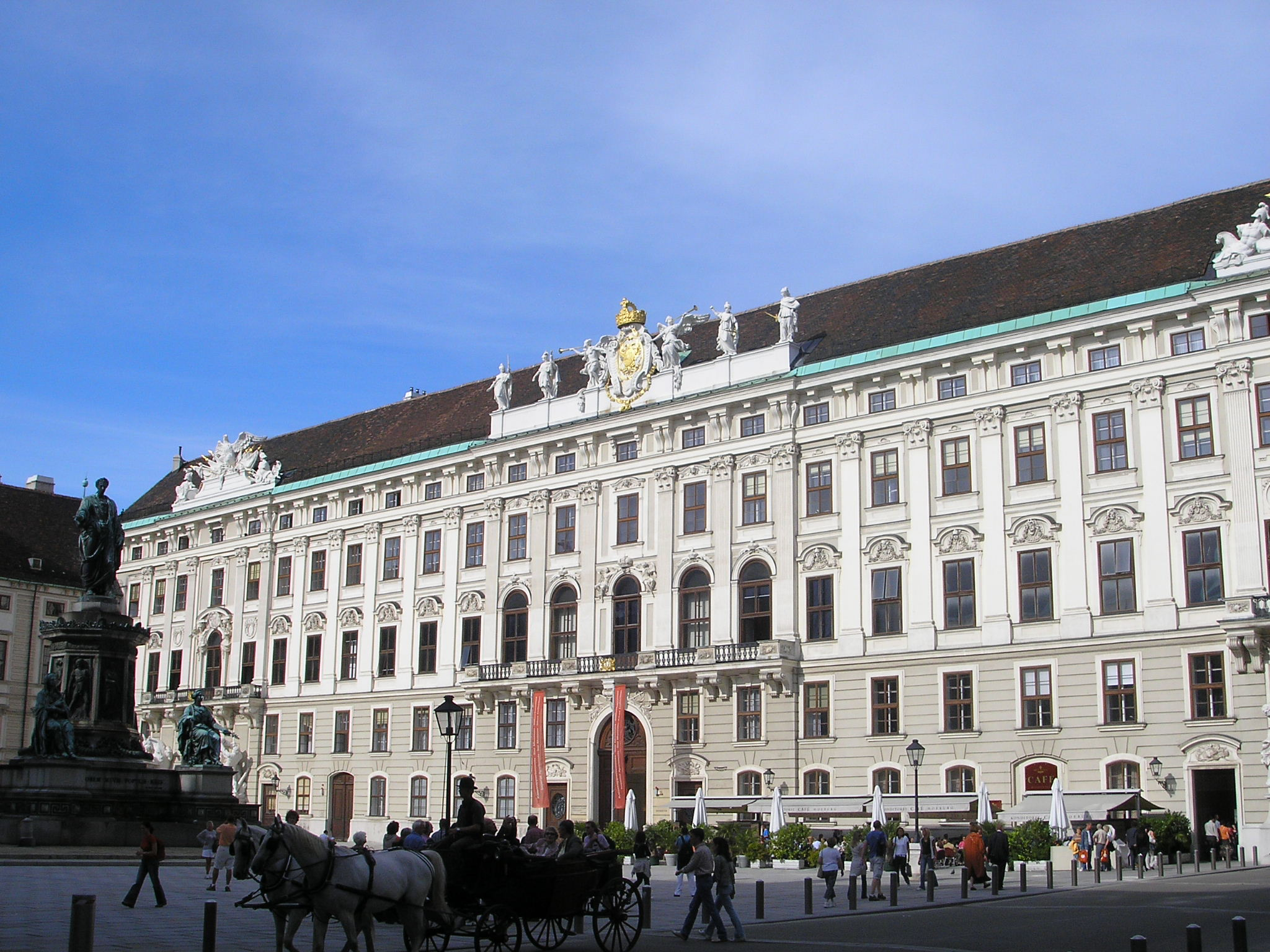
Imperial Chancellory Wing of the Hofburg Palace in Vienna

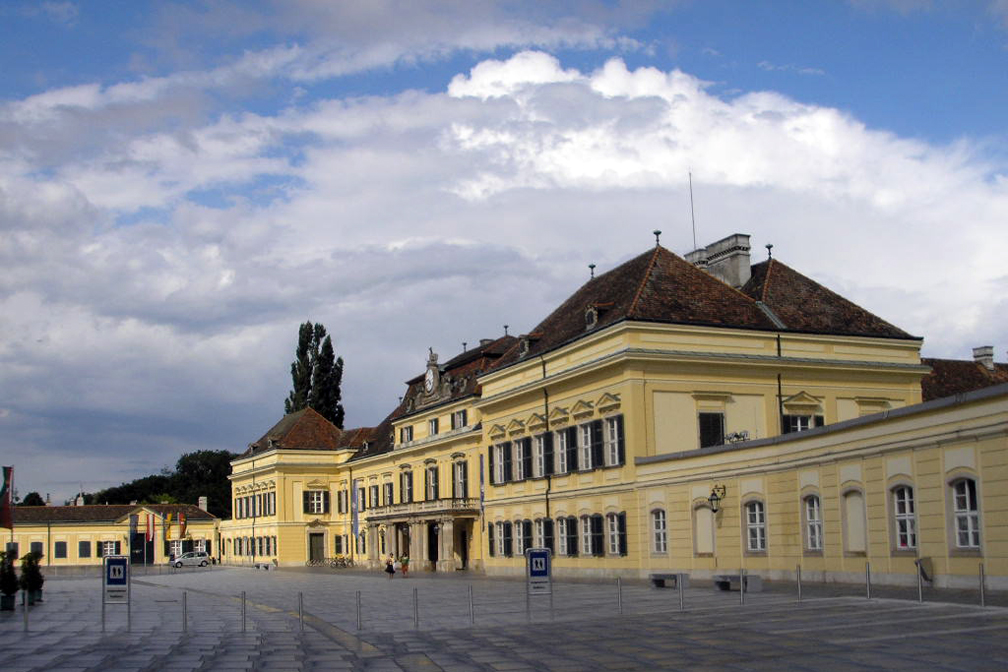
Blauer Hof Laxenburg

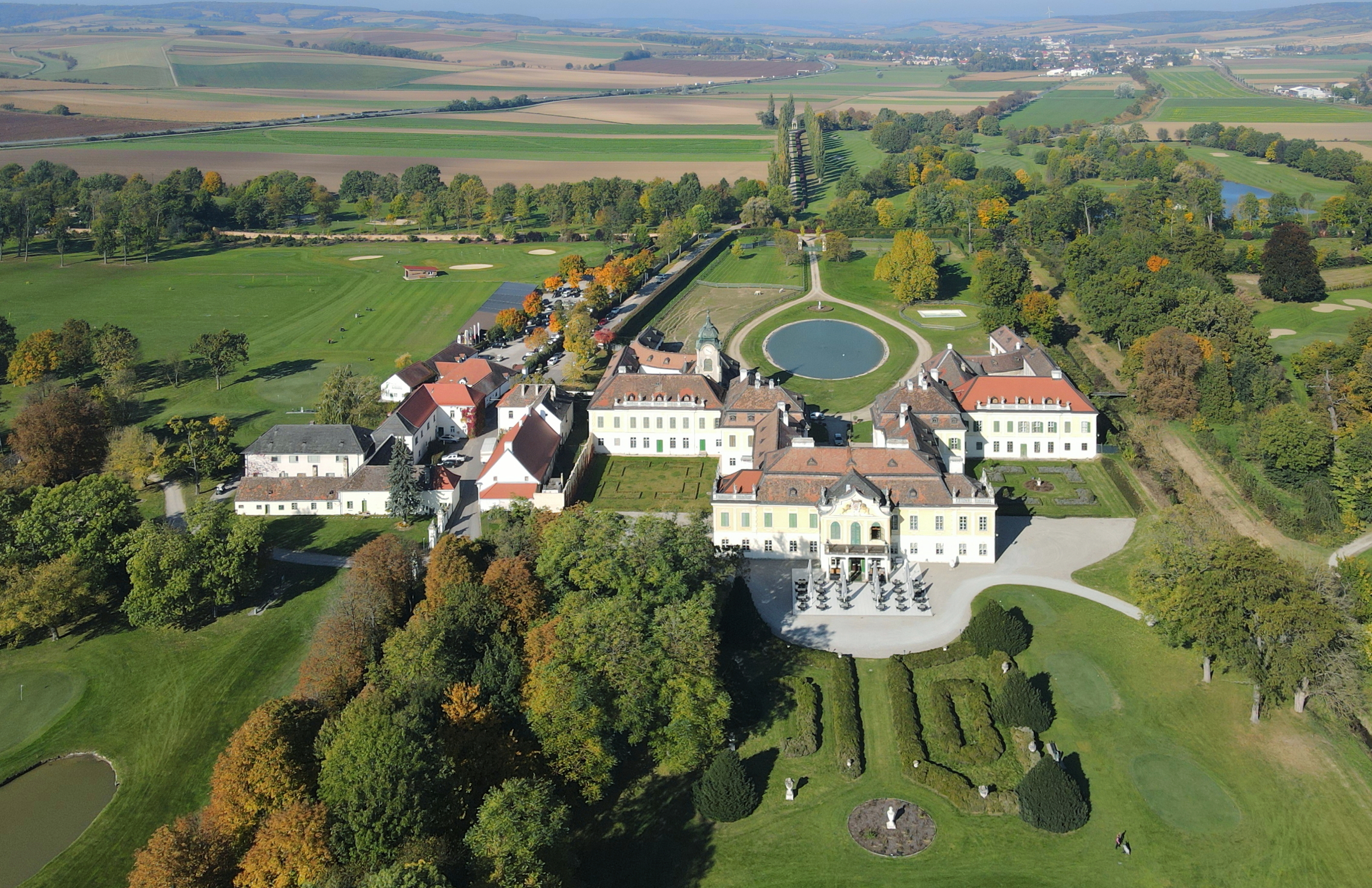
Schloss Schönborn

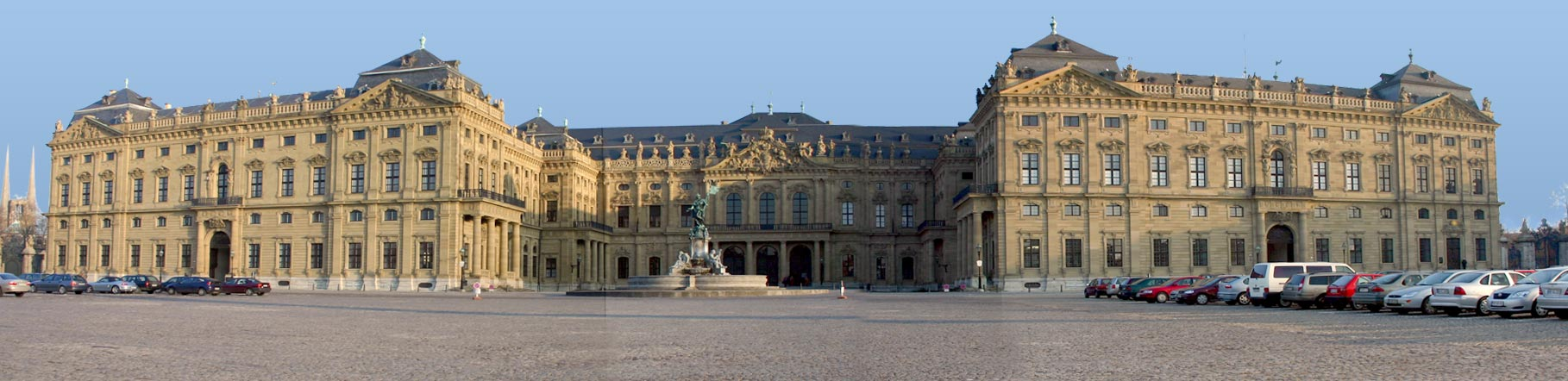
Würzburg Residence

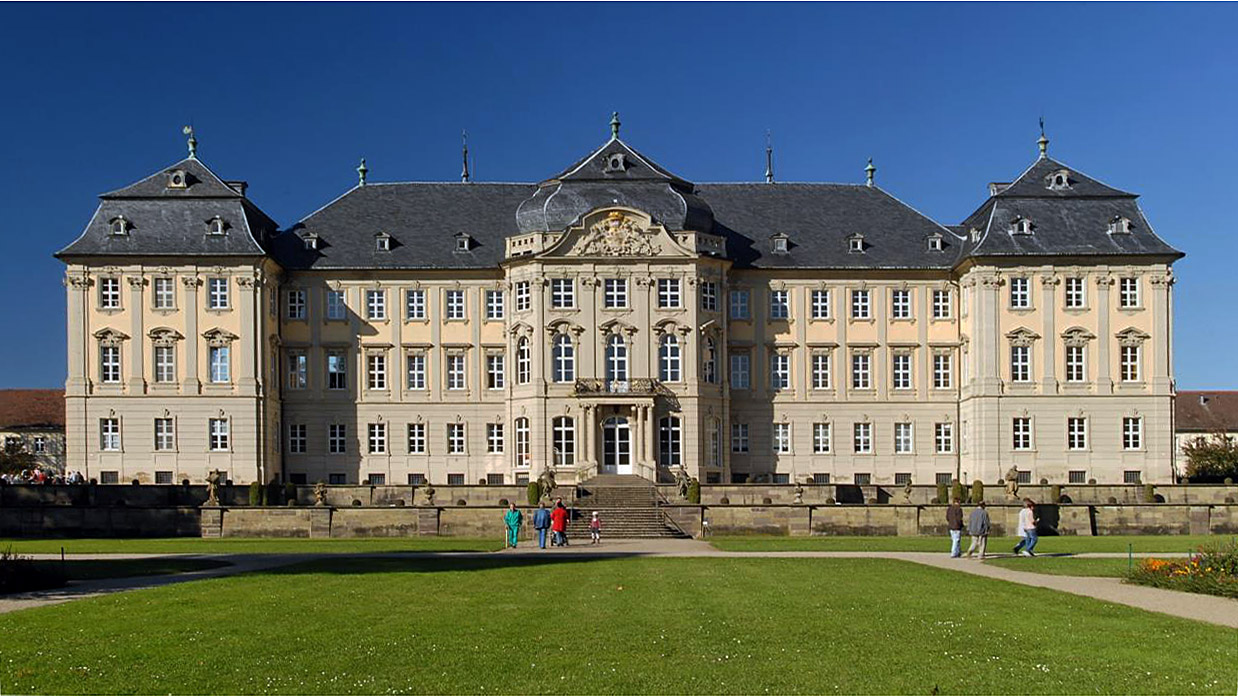
Werneck Palace

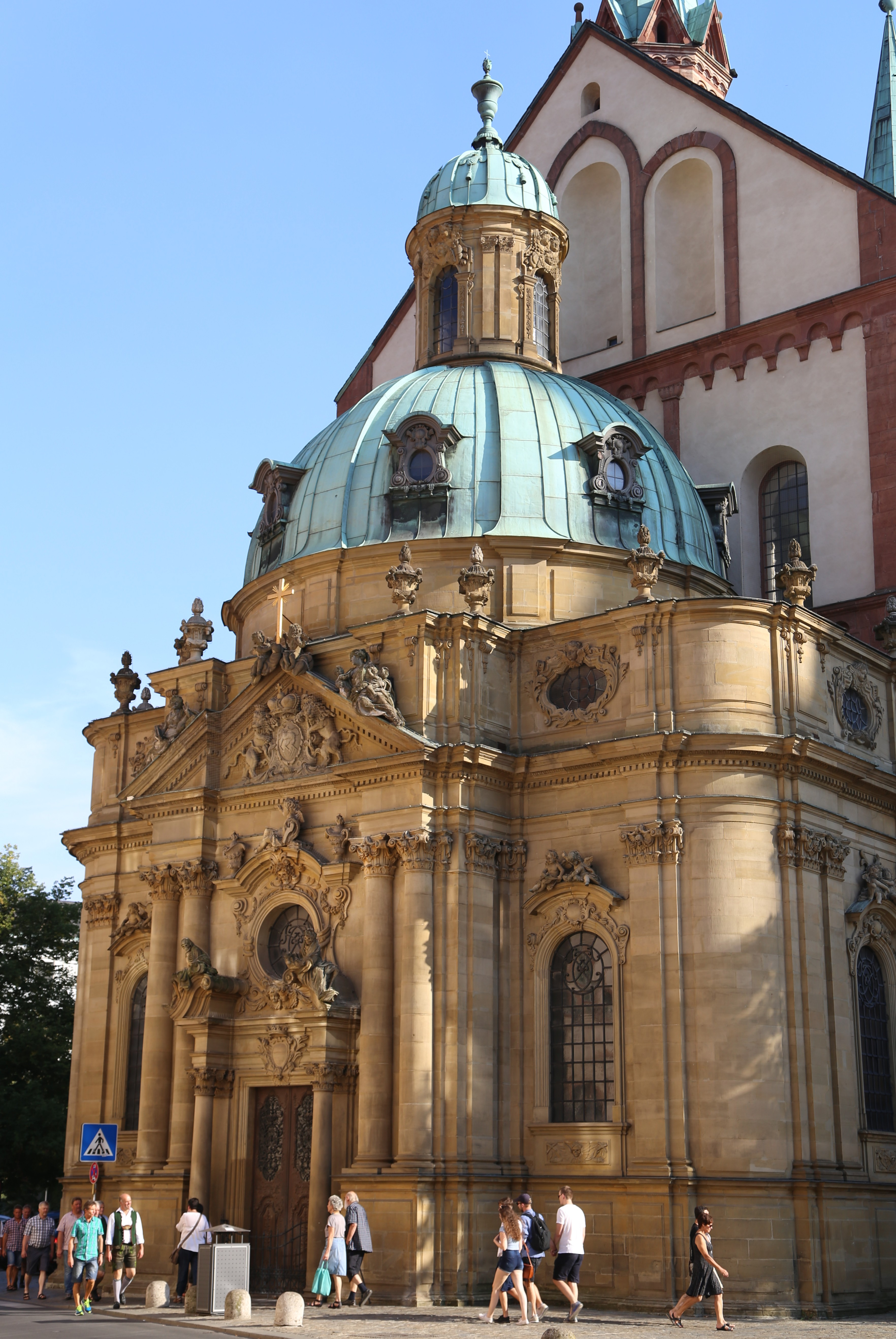
Würzburg Cathedral with adjacent Schönborn burial chapel

Catholic Church titles
Preceded by Lothar Franz von Schönborn	Prince-Bishop of Bamberg; 1729–1746	Succeeded by Johann Philipp Anton von Franckenstein
Preceded by Christoph Franz von Hutten	Prince-Bishop of Würzburg; 1729–1746	Succeeded by Anselm Franz von Ingelheim
