= Franz Georg von Schönborn =

German nobleman and archbishop

- Archbishop-Elector of Trier
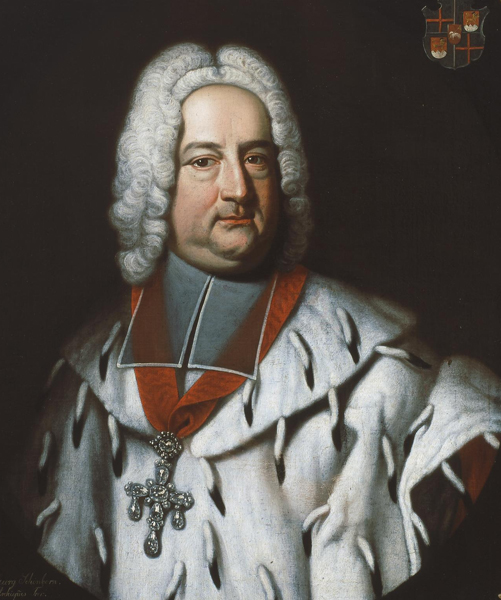
- Portrait by an unknown artist, c. 1740
- Church: Catholic Church
- Archdiocese: Trier
- In office: 1729–1756
- Predecessor: Francis Louis of Palatinate-Neuburg
- Successor: Johann Philipp von Walderdorff

Orders
- Ordination: 11 May 1717 (Deacon); 18 October 1729 (Priest)
- Consecration: 30 October 1729 by Friedrich Karl von Schönborn

Personal details
- Born: 15 June 1682 Mainz, Holy Roman Empire
- Died: 18 January 1756 (aged 73) Philippsburg, Holy Roman Empire

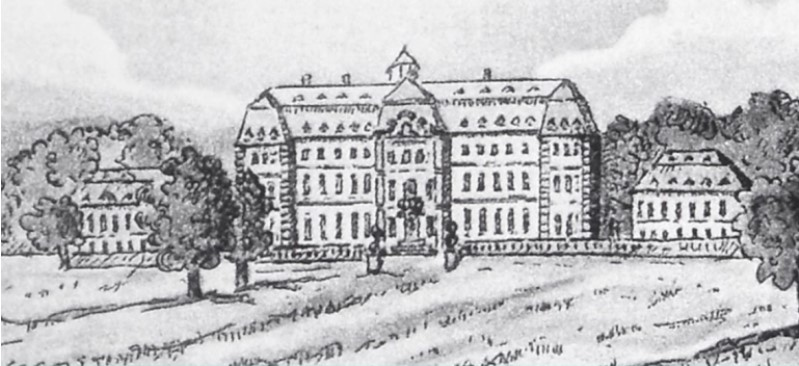
Schönbornslust palace

Franz Georg von Schönborn (15 June 1682 – 18 January 1756) was a German nobleman who served as Archbishop and Elector of Trier from 1729 until his death in 1756. He was also Prince-Bishop of Worms and Prince-Provost of Ellwangen from 1732.

== Biography ==
Franz Georg was born in Mainz, the ninth son of the Count of Schönborn and the nephew of Lothar Franz von Schönborn, the Archbishop-Elector of Mainz. Franz Georg's brothers were Johann Philipp Franz, Friedrich Karl and Hugo Damian, all three important churchmen. Beginning in 1702 he studied law, philosophy, theology, geography, history, and language at Salzburg, Siena, and Leiden. After completing his studies he travelled to the Vatican, Spain, and England. Through the influence of his uncle, Franz Georg gained valuable contacts in the court of the Holy Roman Emperor in Vienna. After his uncle died in 1729 and Franz Ludwig, Archbishop-Elector of Trier, succeeded him after vacating his own see, Franz Georg was unanimously elected the new Archbishop of Trier and thus appointed Prince-Elector of Trier. Owing to the protection of the Papacy in 1732 he was also elected the Prince-Bishop of Worms and the Prince-Provost of Ellwangen Abbey.

Politically Franz Georg sided with the House of Habsburg, and through it the Archbishopric-Electorate of Trier became involved in the great conflicts of the day.

In the second half of his reign, Franz Georg retired from active involvement in politics, and focused on administration and construction projects. From 1737 until 1753 he constructed a Baroque residence in Ellwangen. Beginning in 1739 he began the extension of the Philippsburg in Koblenz. He also constructed a new summer residence, Schönbornslust. In Worms, he continued the rebuilding of the Bischofshof palace, which was started by his predecessor, Francis Louis of Palatinate-Neuburg.

Despite being pious, Franz Georg worked hard to increase the level of education amongst the populace. He outlawed several pilgrimages, holidays and exorcisms. Towards the end of his life Franz Georg's power declined with that of his family. He died in Philippsburg in 1756 and was buried in the Cathedral of Trier.

Franz Georg von Schönborn

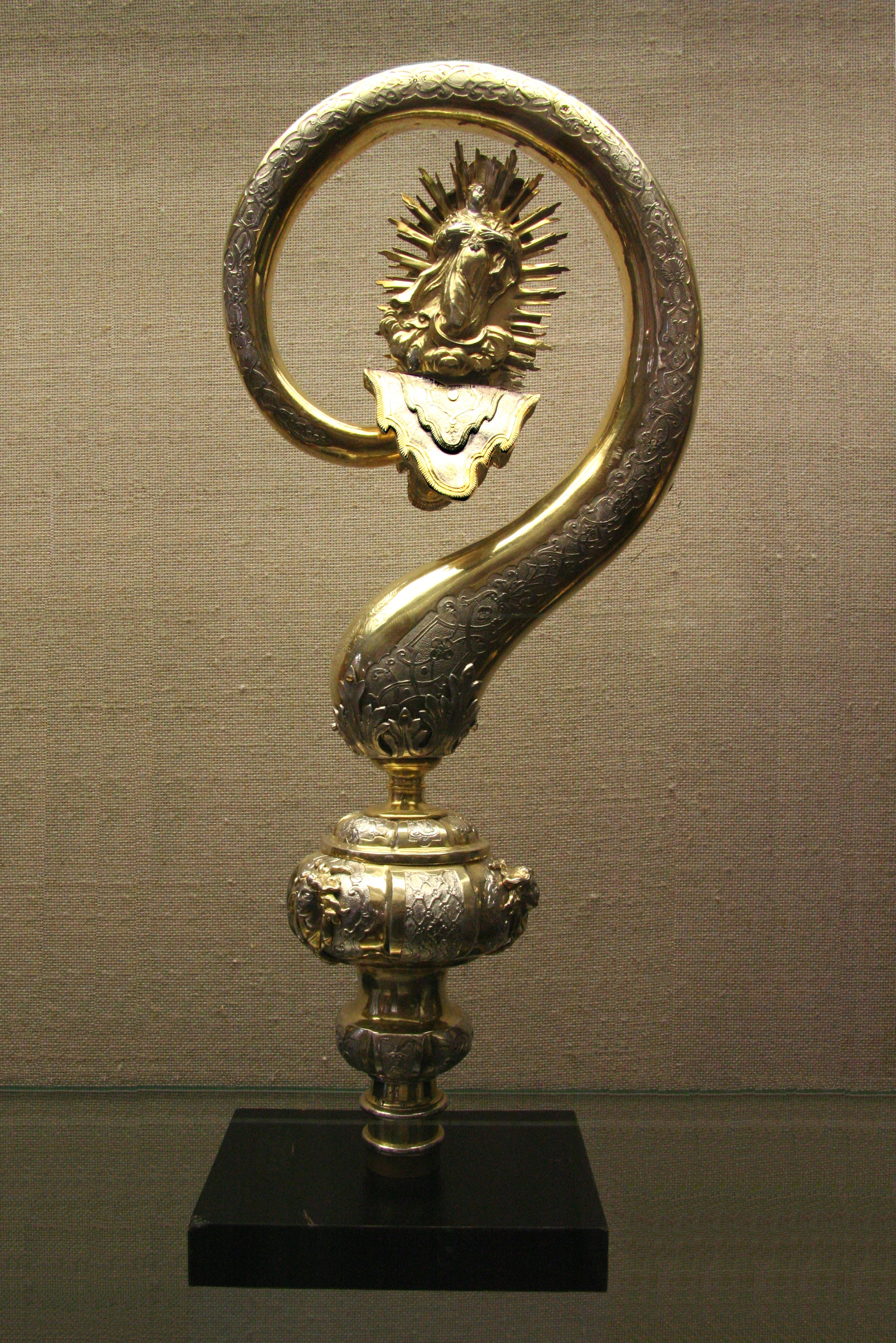
Crozier

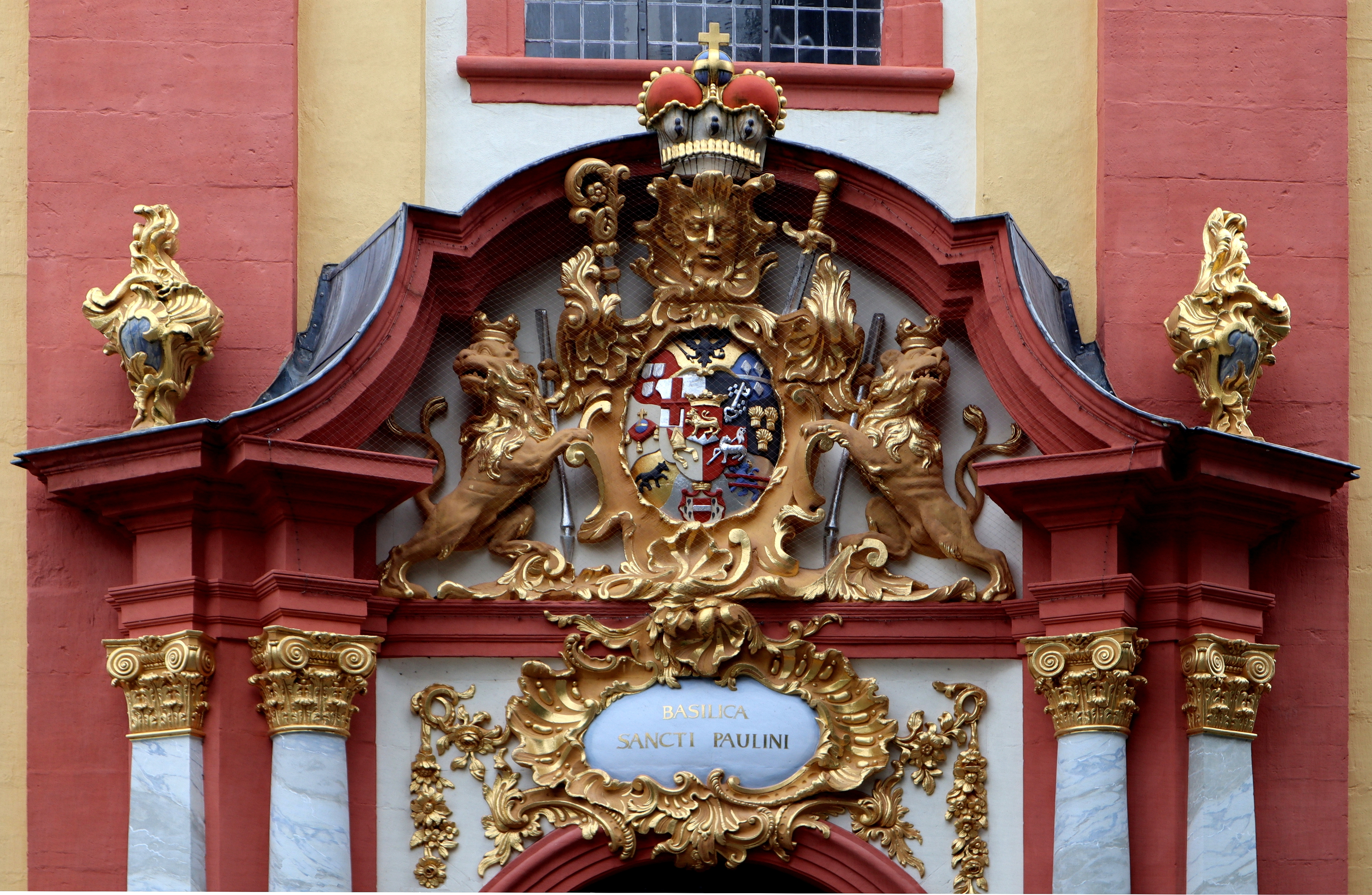
Coat of arms at Basilica of St. Paulinus, Trier

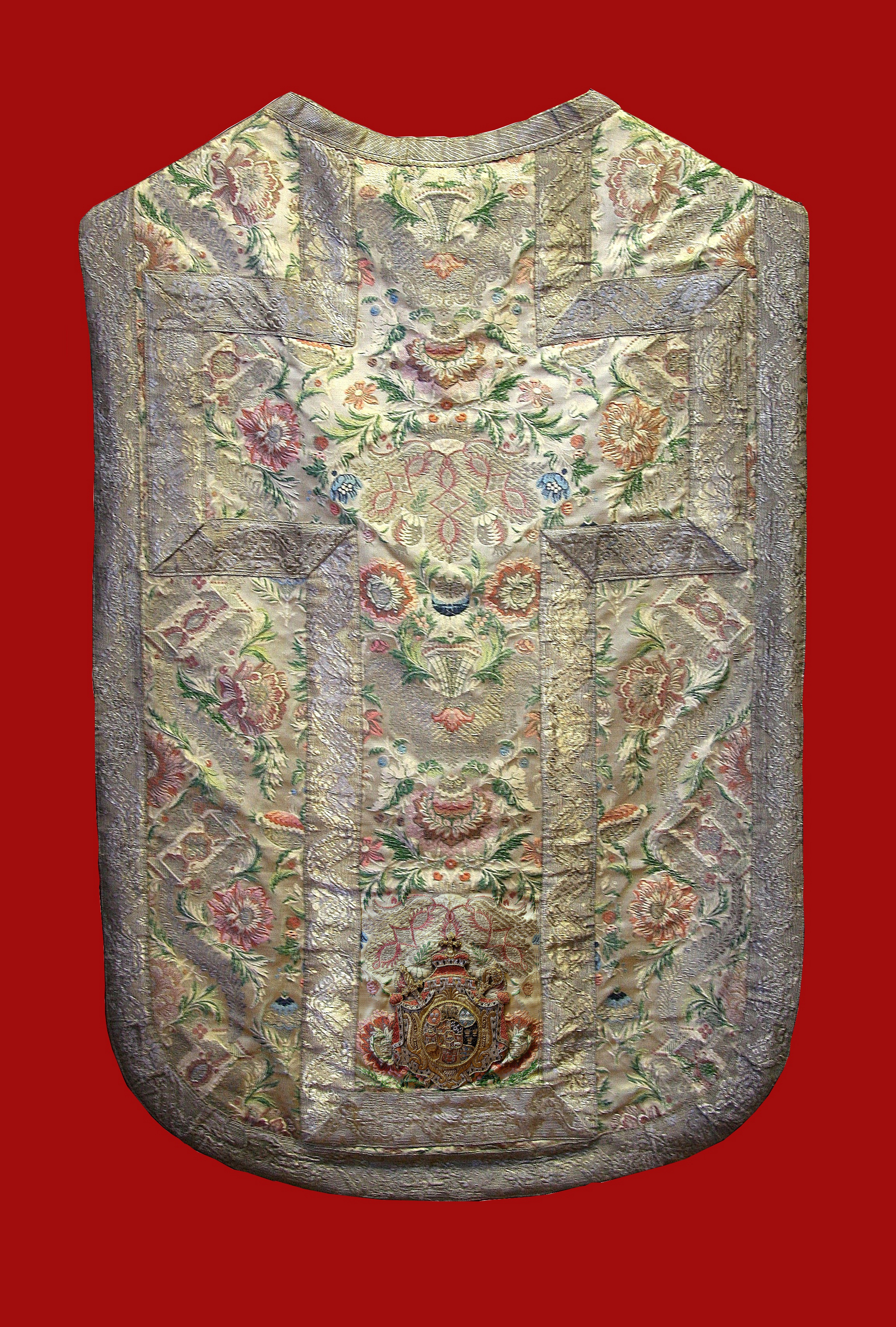
Chasuble

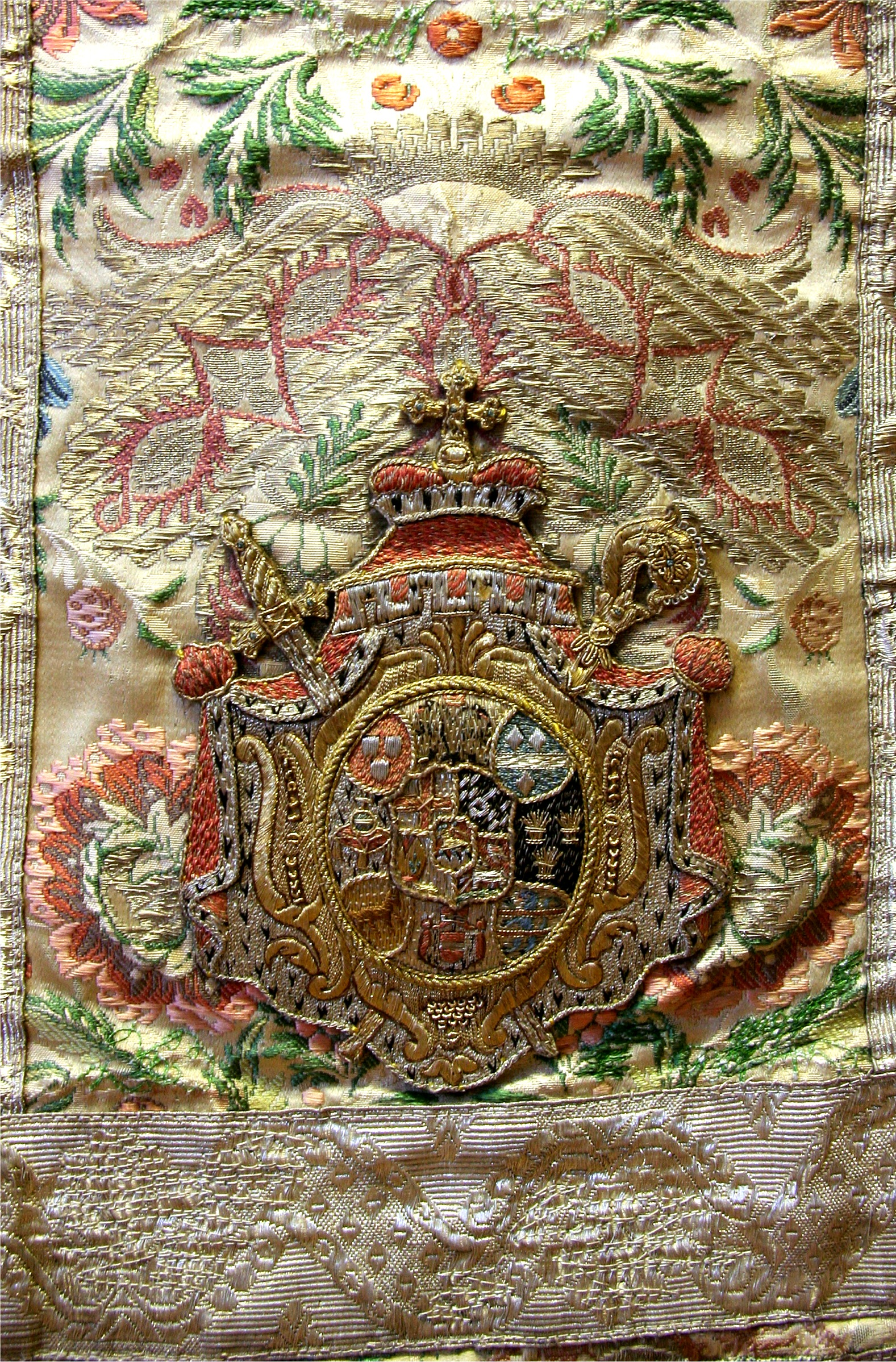
Heraldic figure

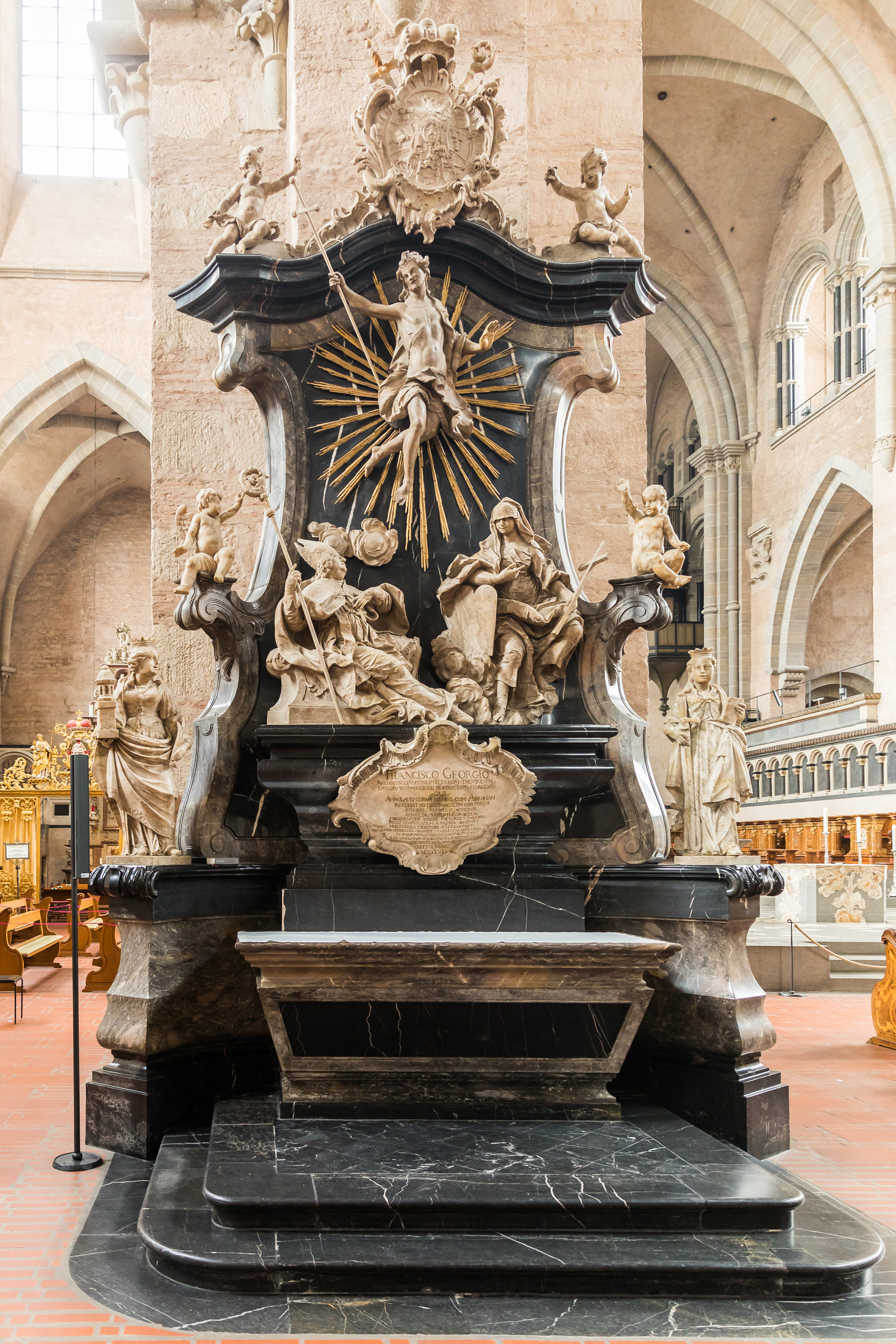
Burial in the Trier cathedral

Franz Georg von Schönborn House of Schönborn Born: 15 June 1682 Died: 18 January 1756
Catholic Church titles
Regnal titles
Preceded by Francis Louis of Palatinate-Neuburg	Archbishop-Elector of Trier and Prince-Abbot of Prüm; 1729–1756	Succeeded by Johann Philipp von Walderdorff
Preceded by Francis Louis of Palatinate-Neuburg	Prince-Bishop of Worms; 1732–1756	Succeeded by Johann Friedrich Karl von Ostein
Preceded by Francis Louis of Palatinate-Neuburg	Prince-Provost of Ellwangen; 1732–1756	Succeeded by Anton Ignaz von Fugger-Glött
