= Johann Christian von Boyneburg =

German politician

Johann Christian von Boyneburg (April 12, 1622 - December 8, 1672) was a German politician.

== Life ==
Johann Christian von Boyneburg was born into a family whose members had often been in the official Hessian state service. His father was the council and aristocratic marshal Johann Berthold von Boineburg-Lengsfeld († 1640) and his mother Barbara Sibylla von Buttlar († 1624).

In 1648 he married Anna Christine († 1689), daughter of the president of the Hessian court of law Kuno Quirin Schütz von Holzhausen.

Johann Christian von Boyneburg became the Hessian ambassador at the Swedish court, later a privy councillor (Geheimrat) and in 1650 first government minister. In 1656 he converted to the Catholic faith.

Von Boyneburg motivated Leibniz to move to Frankfurt. Leibniz also became the teacher of Boyneburg's son Philipp Wilhelm.

== Quotation about Von Boyneburg ==
When Leibniz got the message that Boyneburg had died he wrote in a letter to John Frederick, Duke of Brunswick-Lüneburg:

- "It's certain that the church as well as the fatherland have endured a great loss, which your highness can better estimate than I can express."
  („Es hat gewislich sowohl die Kirche, als das Vaterland an diesem Mann einen großen verlust erlitten, den aber E. Hochfürtsl. Durchl beßer wißen, als ich beschreiben kan.“ [sic])
