= Damian Hugo Philipp von Schönborn =

Roman Catholic cardinal (1676–1743)

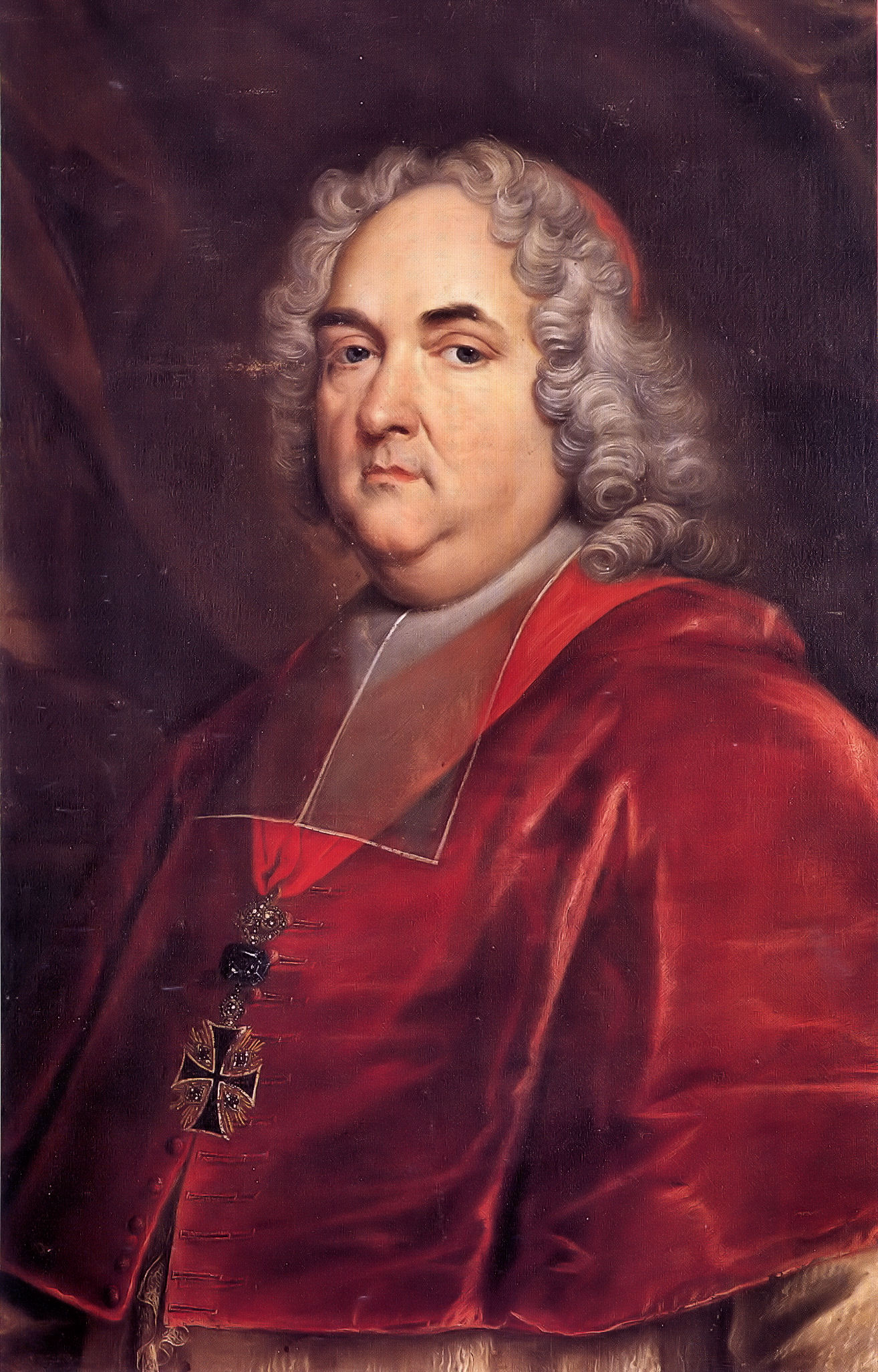
Portrait of the Cardinal von Schönborn

Damian Hugo Philipp von Schönborn (19 September 1676 in Mainz – 19 August 1743 in Bruchsal) was Prince-Bishop of Speyer (1719–1743), Bishop of Konstanz (1740–1743) and a cardinal (1713).

== Biography ==
Born into an ancient German House of Schönborn, as the third son of Count Melchior Friedrich von Schönborn-Buchheim (1644—1717) and his wife, Baroness Maria Anna Sophia von Boineburg-Lengsfeld (1652—1726). His elder brothers were Johann Philipp Franz von Schönborn, Prince-Bishop of Würzburg and Friedrich Karl von Schönborn, Prince-Bishop of Bamberg. He participated in papal conclaves in 1721, 1724 and 1730. He also attended the 1740 papal conclave.

== Death ==
Damian Hugo died on 19 August 1743 in Bruchsal, at the age of 75. He was buried in the Kapuzinerkapelle, Saalbachthal until 1755, when his grave was transmitted to Pfarrkirche St.Peter, Bruchsal, Baden-Württemberg, Germany.
