= Prince-Bishopric of Speyer =

Prince-Bishopric of the Holy Roman Empire

Prince-Bishopric of Speyer Episcopatus Spirensis (Latin) Fürstbistum Speyer (German)
- 888–1803
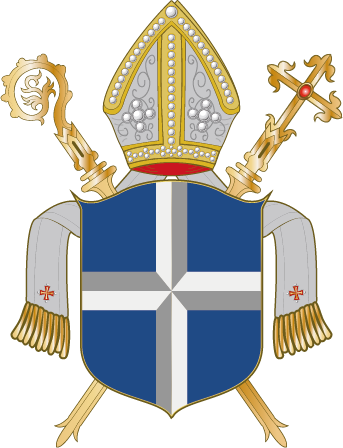
- Coat of arms

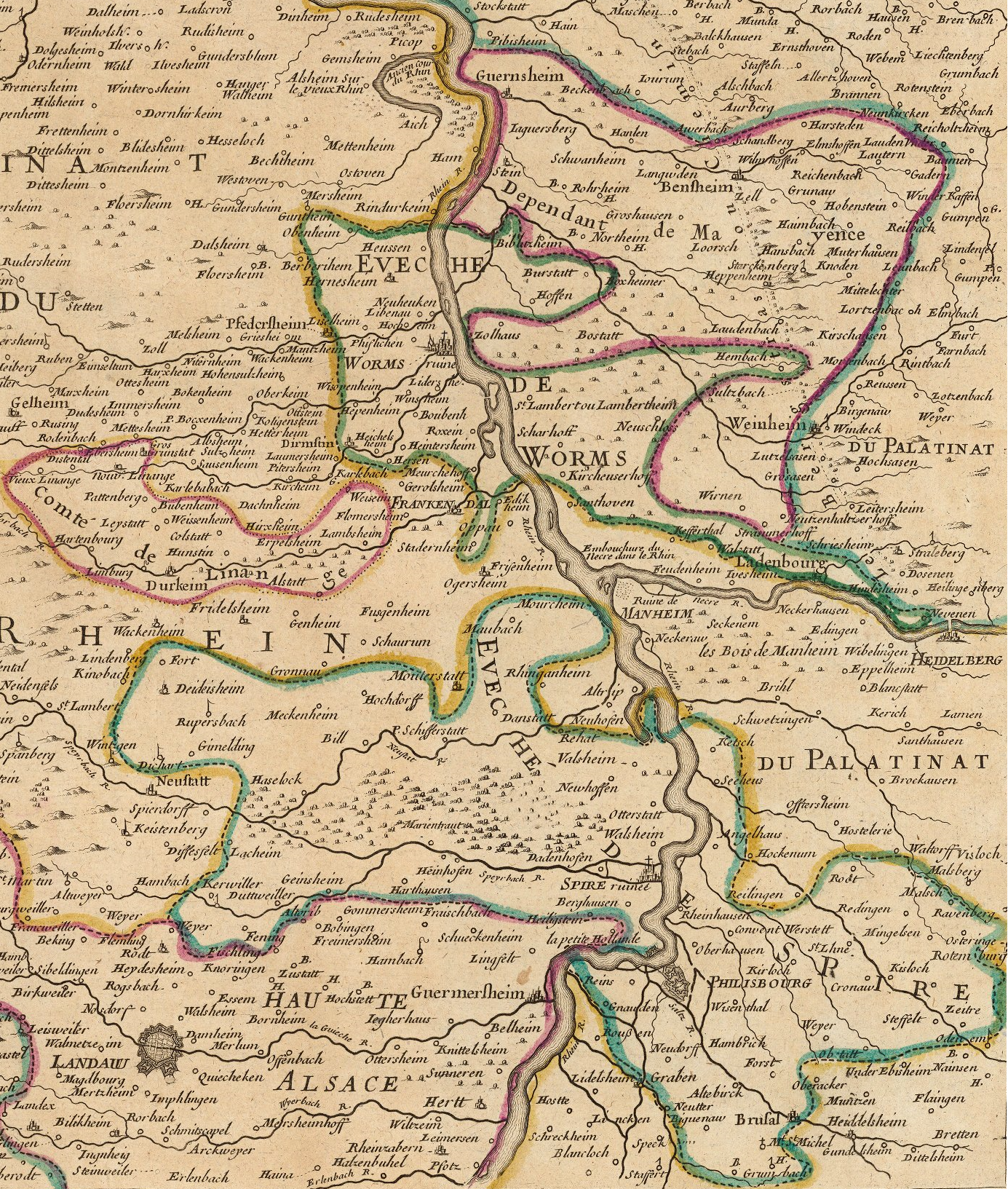
- The Prince-Bishopric of Speyer circa 1700
- Status: Prince-Bishopric
- Capital: Speyer (to 1379); Udenheim^{2} (1379–1723); Bruchsal (from 1723)
- Common languages: Rhine Franconian, South Franconian
- Government: Ecclesiastical principality
- Historical era: Middle Ages
  - Established: 3rd or 4th century
  - Gained territory: 888
  - Speyer became Imperial Free City: 1294
  - Lost territory to France: 1681–97
  - Partitioned and secularised to France and Baden: 1801–03 1803
Preceded by	Succeeded by
Duchy of Franconia	Mont-Tonnerre; Margraviate of Baden / Margraviate of Baden

The Prince-Bishopric of Speyer, formerly known as Spires in English, (German: Hochstift Speyer, Fürstbistum Speyer, Bistum Speyer) was an ecclesiastical principality in what are today the German states of Rhineland-Palatinate and Baden-Württemberg. It was secularized in 1803. The prince-bishop resided in Speyer, a Free Imperial City, until the 14th century, when he moved his residence to Uddenheim (Philippsburg), then in 1723 to Bruchsal. There was a tense relationship between successive prince-bishops, who were Roman Catholic, and the civic authorities of the Free City, officially Protestant since the Reformation. The prince-provostry of Wissemburg in Alsace was ruled by the prince-bishop of Speyer in a personal union.

== Geography ==
The Prince-Bishopric of Speyer belonged to the Upper Rhenish Circle of the Holy Roman Empire. One of the smallest principalities of the Holy Roman Empire, it consisted of more than half a dozen separate enclaves totalling about 28 German square miles (about 1540 km^{2}) on both sides of the Rhine. It included the towns of Bruchsal (on the right bank) as well as Deidesheim, Herxheim bei Landau, and Lauterburg (on the left bank). Around 1800 the bishopric included about 55,000 people.

== History ==
A diocese of Speyer has possibly existed since the 3rd or 4th century. It was first mentioned in historical documents in 614. Up to 748 it was a suffragant bishopric of the archdiocese of Trier, and from then until the secularisation of the prince-bishopric in 1803, of the archdiocese of Mainz.

The history of the Bishopric of Speyer began at the latest in the late 7th century when the bishop of Speyer received royal domains in the neighboring Speyergau. In the 10th and 11th centuries, the diocese received additional lands, including gifts by emperor Otto I. In 1030 the building of the cathedral was begun. In 1061 the cathedral was consecrated. In 1086 emperor Henry IV granted the bishopric the remaining parts of the county of Speyergau.

From 1111 the citizens of the city of Speyer began to increasingly loosen their bonds to the rulership of the bishop. In 1230 a Bürgermeister was mentioned for the first time. In 1294 Speyer became a Free Imperial City. The bishop moved his palace in 1371 to Udenheim. At the beginning of the 17th century bishop Philipp Christoph von Sötern expanded the fortress of Philippsburg. The prince-bishops reigned from there from 1371 to 1723. Afterwards the prince-bishop moved his seat to Bruchsal.

French troops captured Philippsburg in 1644 during the later stages of the Thirty Year's War. France gained the fortress in the 1648 Peace of Westphalia. During the Franco-Dutch War, Imperial troops recaptured it in 1676. In the Treaty of Nijmegen 1679, the fortress was officially returned to the Bishop and the Empire. However, France annexed parts of the bishopric's left-bank territories in 1681 as Reunion and seized Philippsburg again in 1688 at the beginning of the Nine Years' War. The occupied territory was not returned until 1697 in the Peace of Rijswijk.

In 1801/1802, the remaining left-bank territories of Speyer were conquered by French troops in the course of the French Revolution. The right-bank territories went to margraves of Baden.

This ended the secular responsibilities of the bishop of Speyer. The secularized bishopric continued ecclesiastically as the Diocese of Speyer. Finally, the French part of the former prince-bishopric was divided between Bavaria and Hesse Darmstadt in 1815.

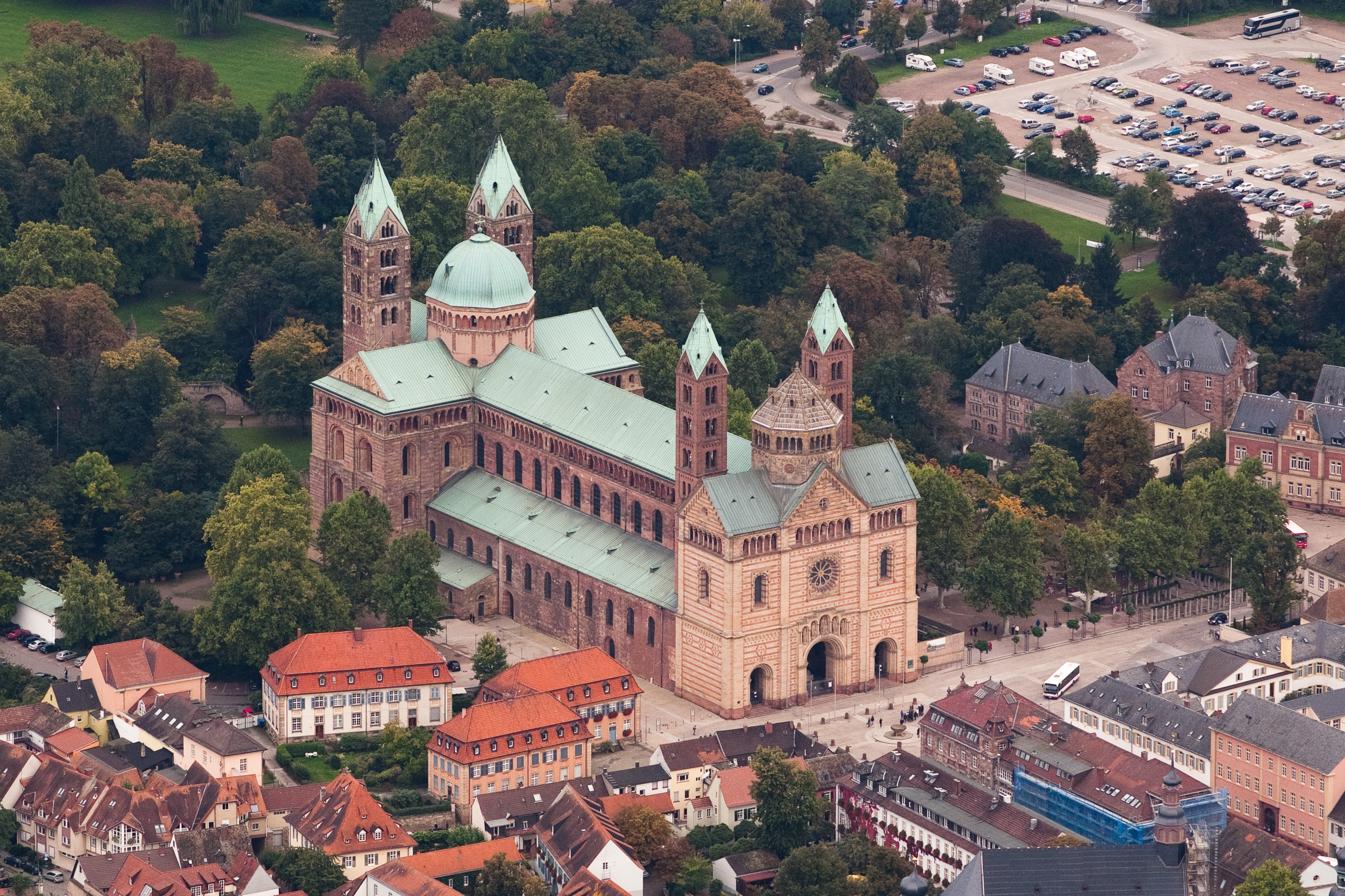
Speyer Cathedral

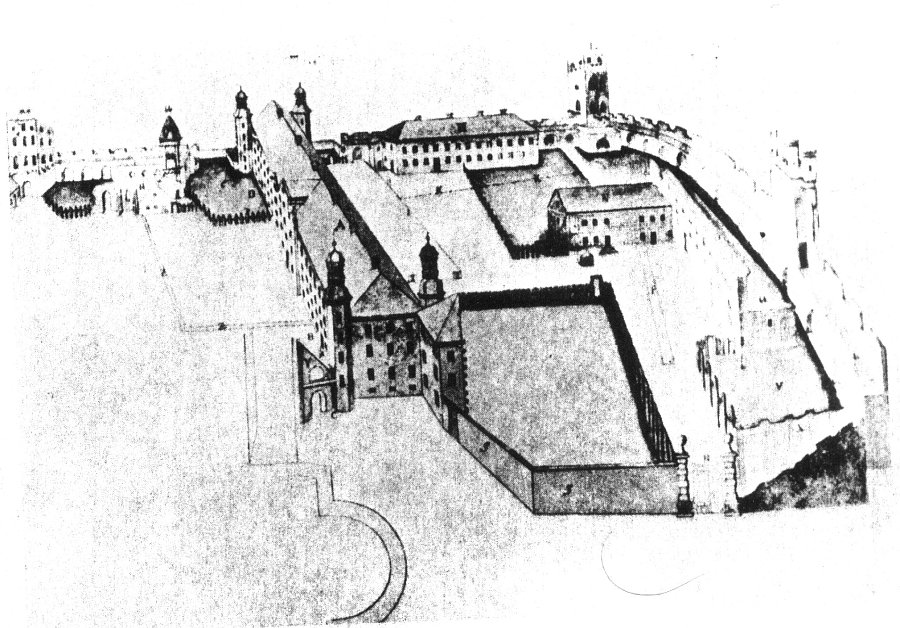
The Bishop's palace next to Speyer Cathedral (1765)

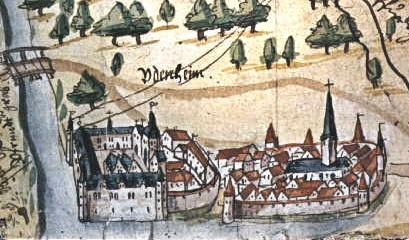
Udenheim Castle (main residence of the bishops from 1371)

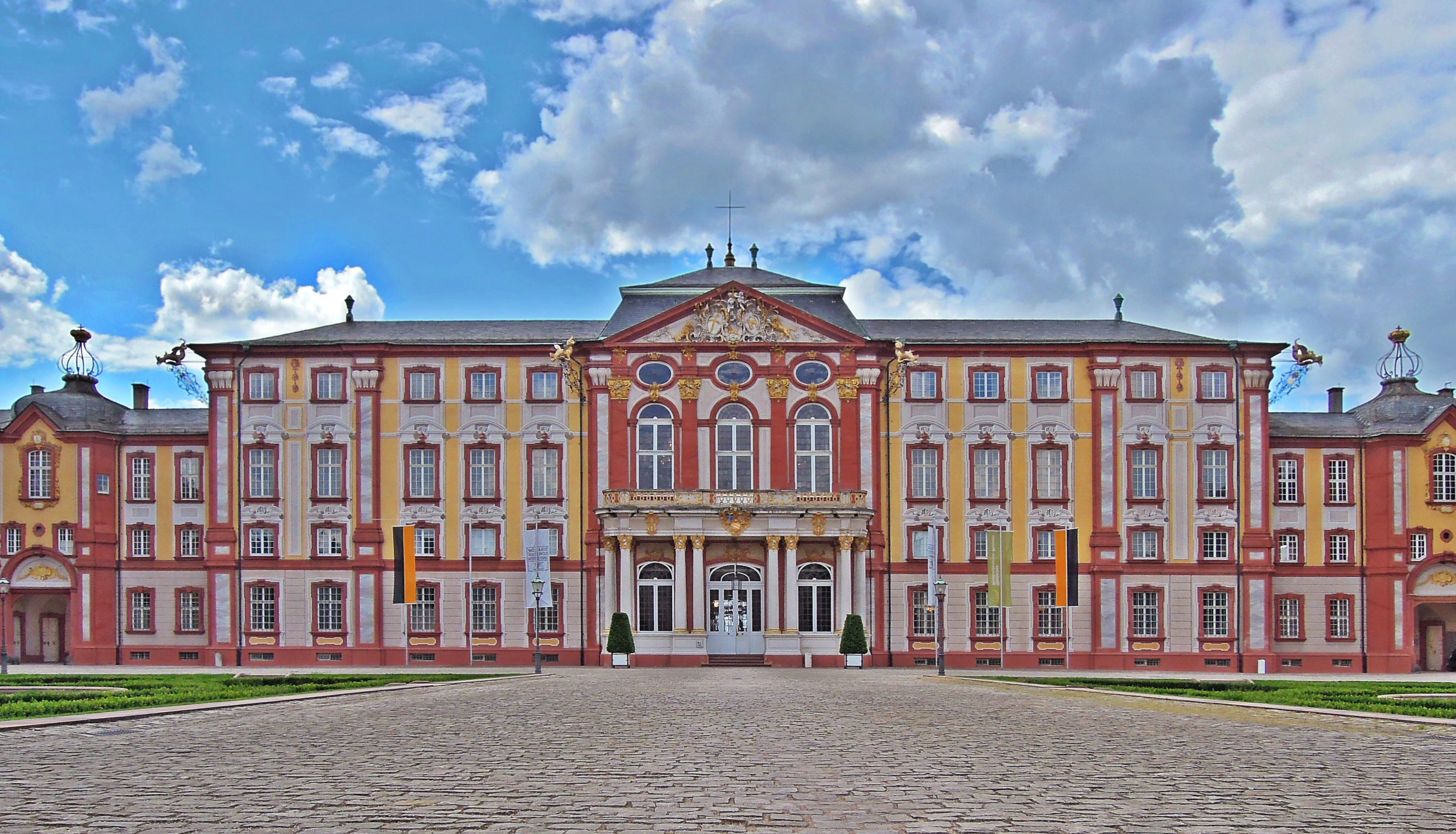
Bruchsal Palace (main residence from 1723)

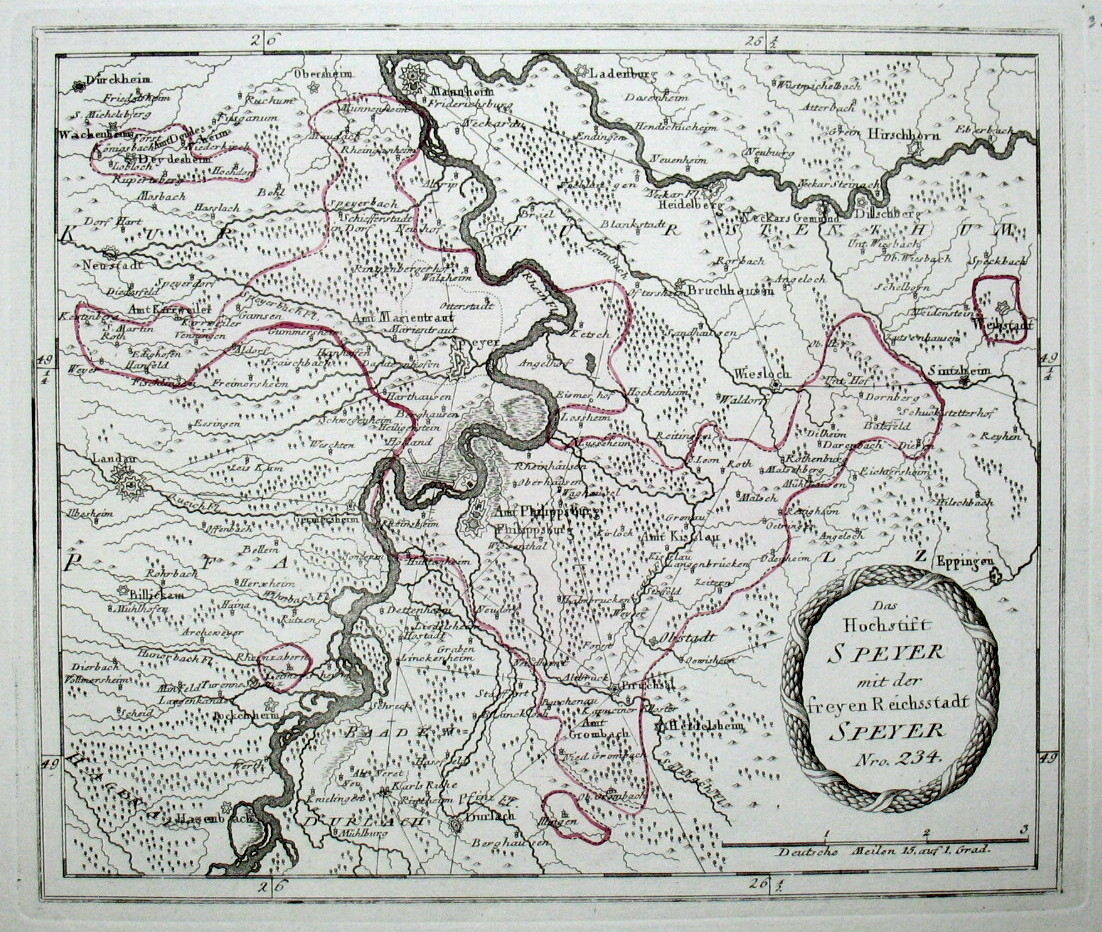
Bishopric of Speyer 1793/93

== See also ==
- Speyer Cathedral
