= Schönborn Palace (Beregvar) =

Transcarpathian hunting lodge of the Schönborn family in Ukraine

Coordinates: 48°31′30″N 22°52′29″E

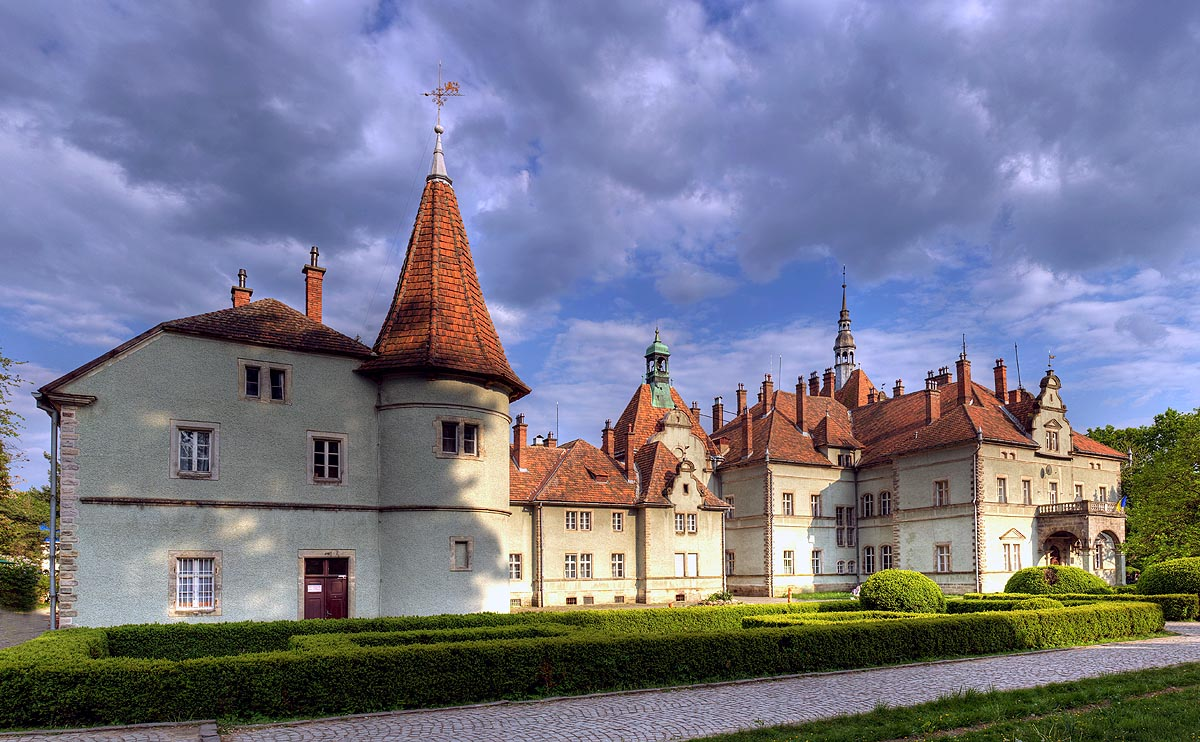
The Beregvar hunting lodge

The Beregvar Hunting Lodge (Ukrainian: Палац графів Шенборнів or German: Schloss Beregvár or German: Jagdchloss Beregvár) is a palace in a neo-romantic style. It is located in Karpaty, which is part of Chynadiiovo in the Mukachevo Raion, Zakarpattia Oblast, Ukraine.

Built between 1890 and 1895 by Erwein-Friedrich von Schönborn-Buchheim, the palace served as a hunting estate and a seasonal residence for the Schönborn family, a prominent Austro-Hungarian aristocratic dynasty. Surrounded by a picturesque dendrological park featuring rare tree species, a decorative lake, and sculptural compositions, the hunting lodge is renowned for its architectural elegance, blending Romanesque and Gothic motifs with French Renaissance influences. Since 1946, the building has housed the "Karpaty" sanatorium, specializing in cardiovascular and neurological treatments.

== History ==
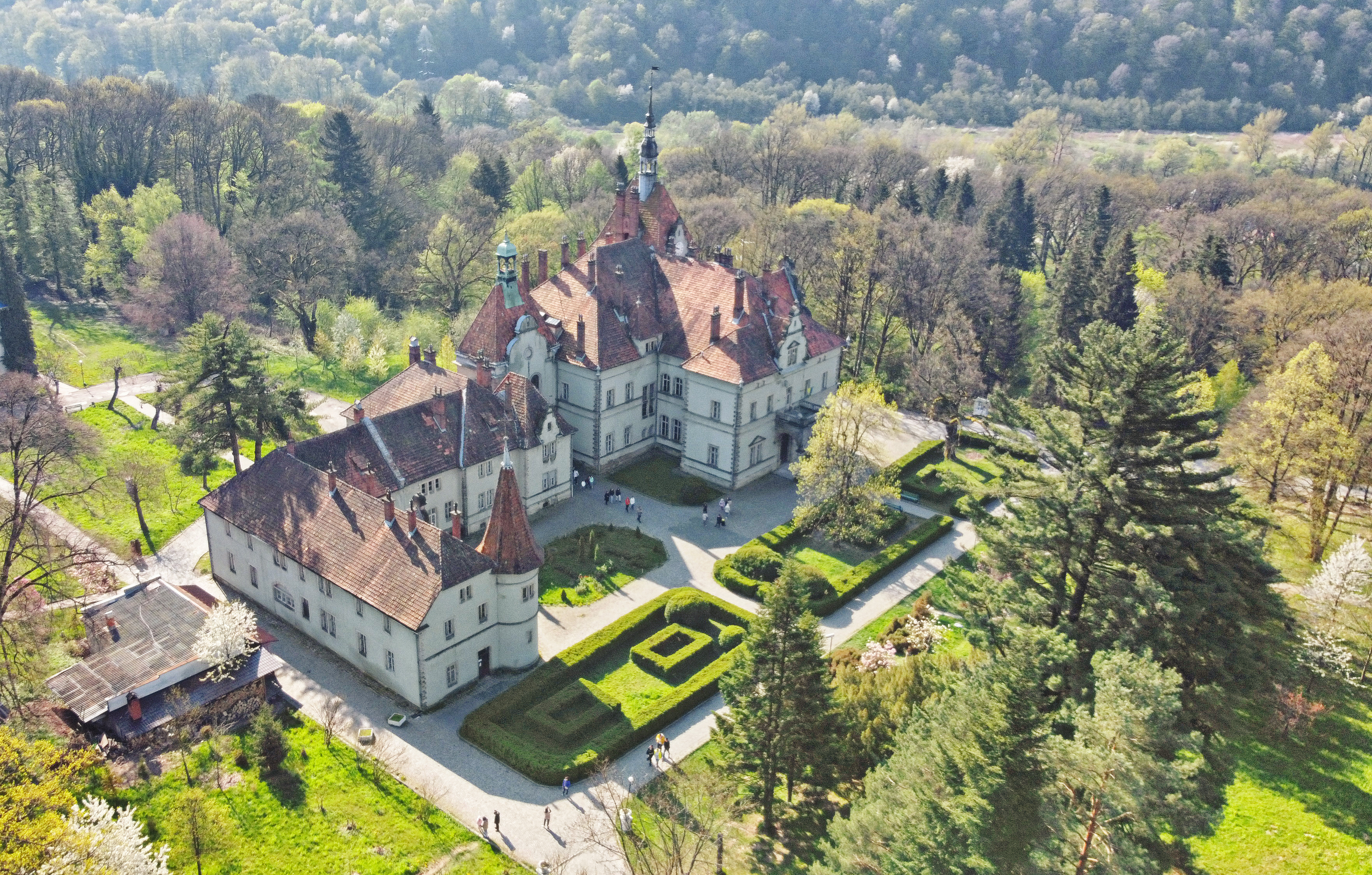
The Beregvar hunting lodge

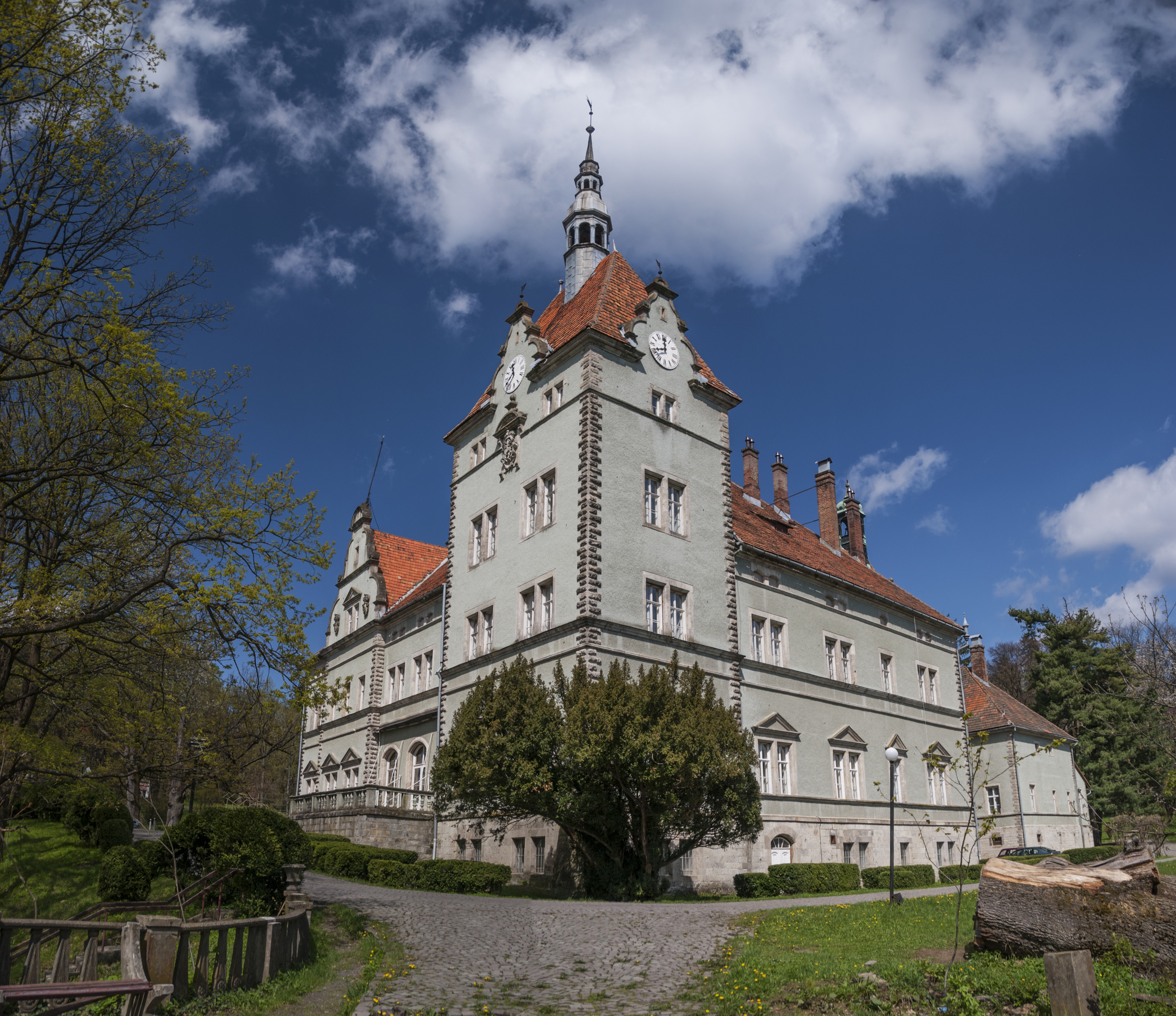
The Schönborn hunting lodge

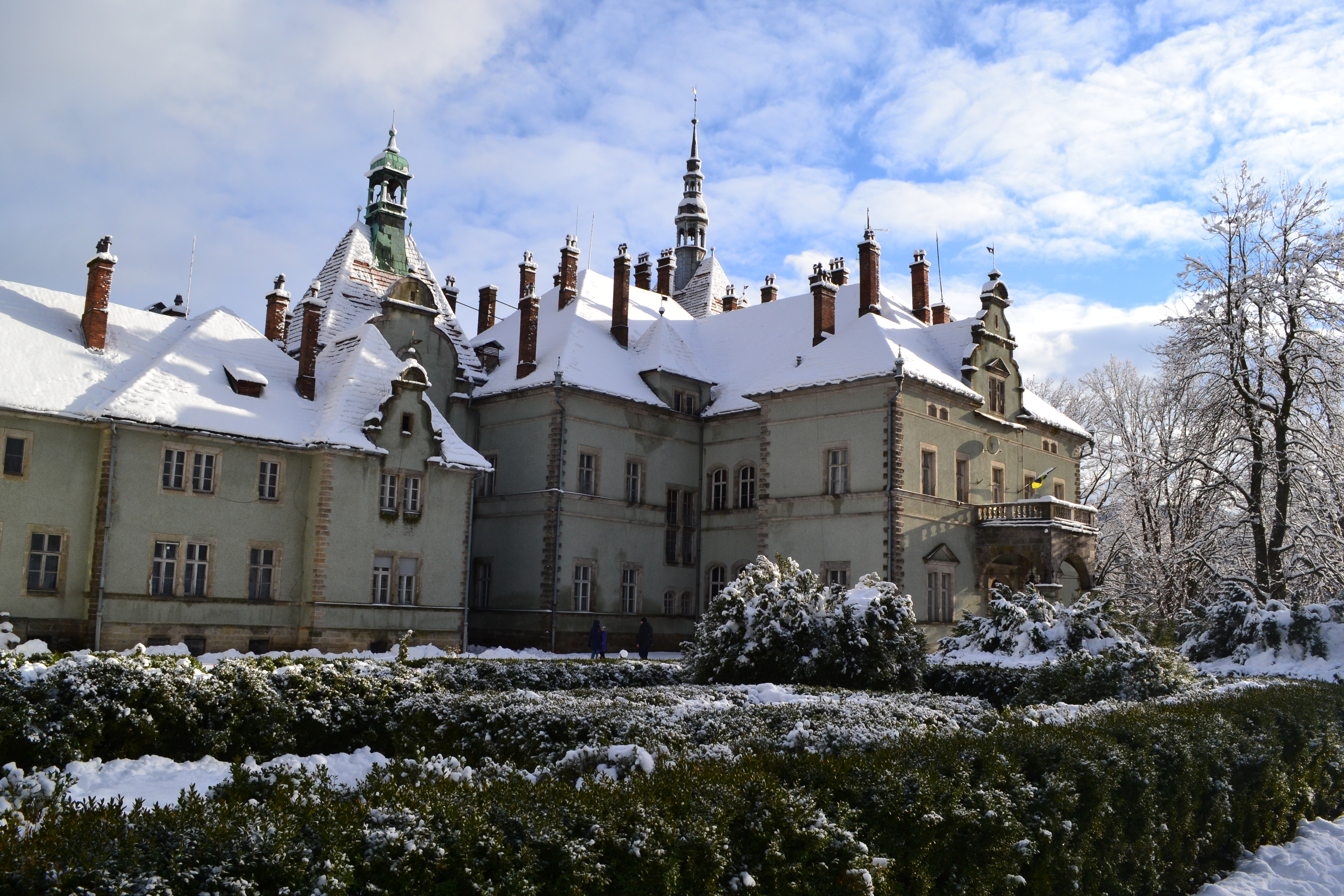
The lodge under a layer of snow

=== Francis II Rákóczi ===
Between 1703 and 1711, there was an uprising aiming to topple the rule of the Habsburgs over Hungary. The war was led by prince Francis II Rákóczi (Hungarian: II. Rákóczi Ferenc) (1676–1735), the son of an old noble family and one of the richest landlords in the Kingdom of Hungary. Rákóczi's War of Independence was unsuccessful, ending with the Treaty of Szatmár. Although assured clemency, prince Francis II did not accept nor recognized the peace conditions, his estates and properties in Hungary were confiscated. As a result, Mukacheve including Palanok Castle, Szentmiklós (today named Chynadiyovo), and 200 villages were transferred to the royal treasury.

=== Lothar Franz von Schónborn and his heir Friedrich Karl von Schönborn ===
In 1728, Charles VI, Holy Roman Emperor gifted the Mukachevo-Chinadiyiv estate to Lothar Franz von Schönborn (1655–1729), the Archbishop-Elector of Mainz, who had helped to defeat Rákóczi by sending troops. The estate, a so-called Majorat, was one of the largest in Eastern Europe and Lothar-Franz entrusted the management of the estates to his nephew and heir, Friedrich Karl von Schönborn (1674–1746), the Reichsvizekanzler (vice-chancellor) of the Holy Roman Empire from 1705 to 1734 and Prince-Bishop of Würzburg and Prince-Bishop of Bamberg from 1729 to 1746. Administrators were appointed to manage the day-to-day affairs and inspectors were sent from time to time to inspect.

To promote the economic development of the region, Friedrich Karl von Schönborn populated the Mukachevo-Chinadiiv estate with German immigrants, offering them passports, monetary incentives, land plots, and building materials to construct homes. Additionally, artisans were granted a ten-year tax exemption, while peasants were exempt for six years.

Szentmiklós Castle was renovated in 1734 to become a residence for the Schönborn family. Furthermore, between 1746 and 1747, the former palace of the Rákóczi princes in Mukacheve, known as the White Palace, was rebuilt and expanded with the assistance of architect Balthasar Neumann to serve as another residence for the family.

=== The Austrian Branch of the Schönborn family: Schönborn-Buchheim ===
After Friedrich Karl's death, the estate was inherited by his brother, Rudolf Franz Erwein von Schönborn (1677–1754), who sold it to his nephew, Eugen Erwein von Schönborn-Heusenstamm (1727–1801). Eugen had already inherited Friedrich Karl's Austrian properties, including Palais Schönborn-Batthyány and Schloss Schönborn. Since Eugen had only daughters and no sons, the estate passed to his cousin's son, Hugo Damian Erwein von Schönborn-Wiesentheid (1739–1817). Hugo divided his time between the Schönborner Hof in Mainz, the Franconian palaces of Wiesentheid and Weißenstein in Pommersfelden, and Vienna. Upon his death, his sons divided the estates, leading to the emergence of the Austrian branch of the Schönborn family under Franz Philipp von Schönborn-Buchheim (1768–1841). In addition to the Austrian estates, this branch also inherited the Mukachevo-Chinadiiv estate.

During the 18th and 19th centuries, the Mukachevo-Chinadiiv estate experienced rapid development thanks to well-planned agricultural and economic policies. For instance, Count Eugen established a hosiery factory and a large stud farm. In 1782, he also oversaw the construction of a bridge over the Latorica River.

For the Austrian branch of the Schönborn family, visiting Szentmiklós each autumn and hosting hunting parties became a cherished tradition. To facilitate these gatherings, Erwein-Friedrich von Schönborn-Buchheim (1842–1903) constructed the Beregvár hunting lodge between 1890 and 1895, replacing a former wooden lodge. Both he and his son and heir, Friedrich Karl von Schönborn-Buchheim (1869–1932), frequently hosted distinguished guests from across Austria-Hungary.

Following the First World War, Transcarpathia became part of Czechoslovakia. In 1928, the Mukachevo-Chinadiiv estate was dissolved as part of a land reform implemented by the Czechoslovak government. To retain his holdings, Count Schönborn-Buchheim arranged a financial transaction whereby the company Bignon, funded by French, Swiss, and Czech capital, purchased the estate at a nominal price and immediately transferred them to the company Latoritsa, of which Count Schönborn-Buchheim was the main shareholder.

The last owner of the Beregvár hunting lodge was Count Georg-Erwein von Schönborn-Buchheim (1906–1989), who left Mukachevo in September 1944. The family took refuge in Sankt Gallenkirch in Montafon, Austria. After the end of the Russian occupation of Lower Austria in 1955, the family regained Schloss Schönborn and Weyerburg castle, where they to continue to live up to this day. Count Georg and his wife Christiane never lost contact with the region, even during the difficult times that followed. Until the very end, they collected donations for the population of the former estates, feeling not only a personal connection but also a sense of duty to support those in need. Thanks to the countess, in 1994, the Austrian budget included funds for the modernization of Mukachevo water management. The city received completed facilities of environmentally friendly pipes, automation and a device that detects damage to pipes underground. Also, she organized humanitarian aid to the victims of the floods of 1998 and 2001. In October 1997, Countess Christiane Schönborn-Buchheim was awarded the title of "Honorary Citizen of the City of Mukachevo" for her generous charitable assistance.

==== Gallery: The Beregvar hunting lodge seen from the air ====
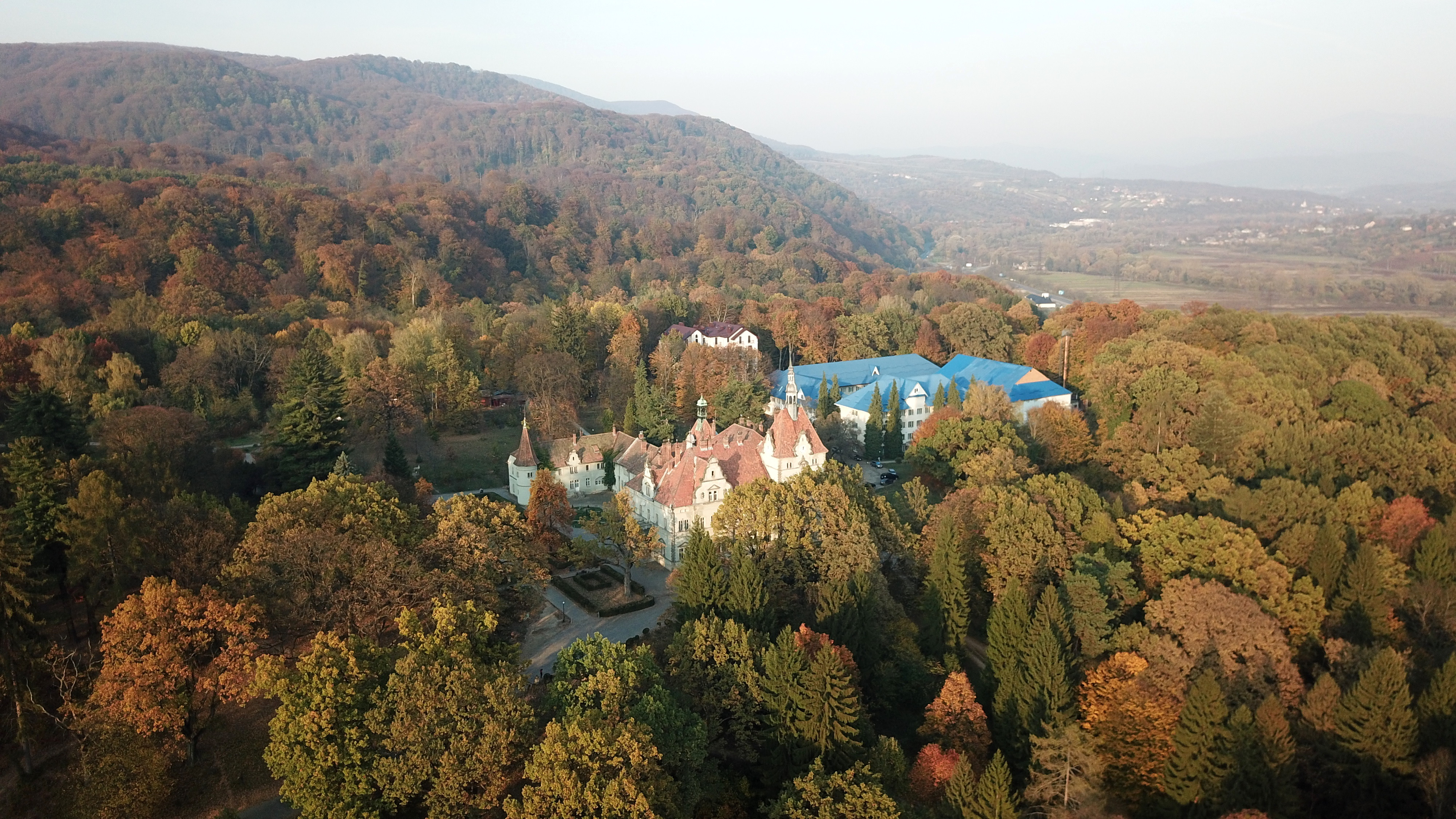

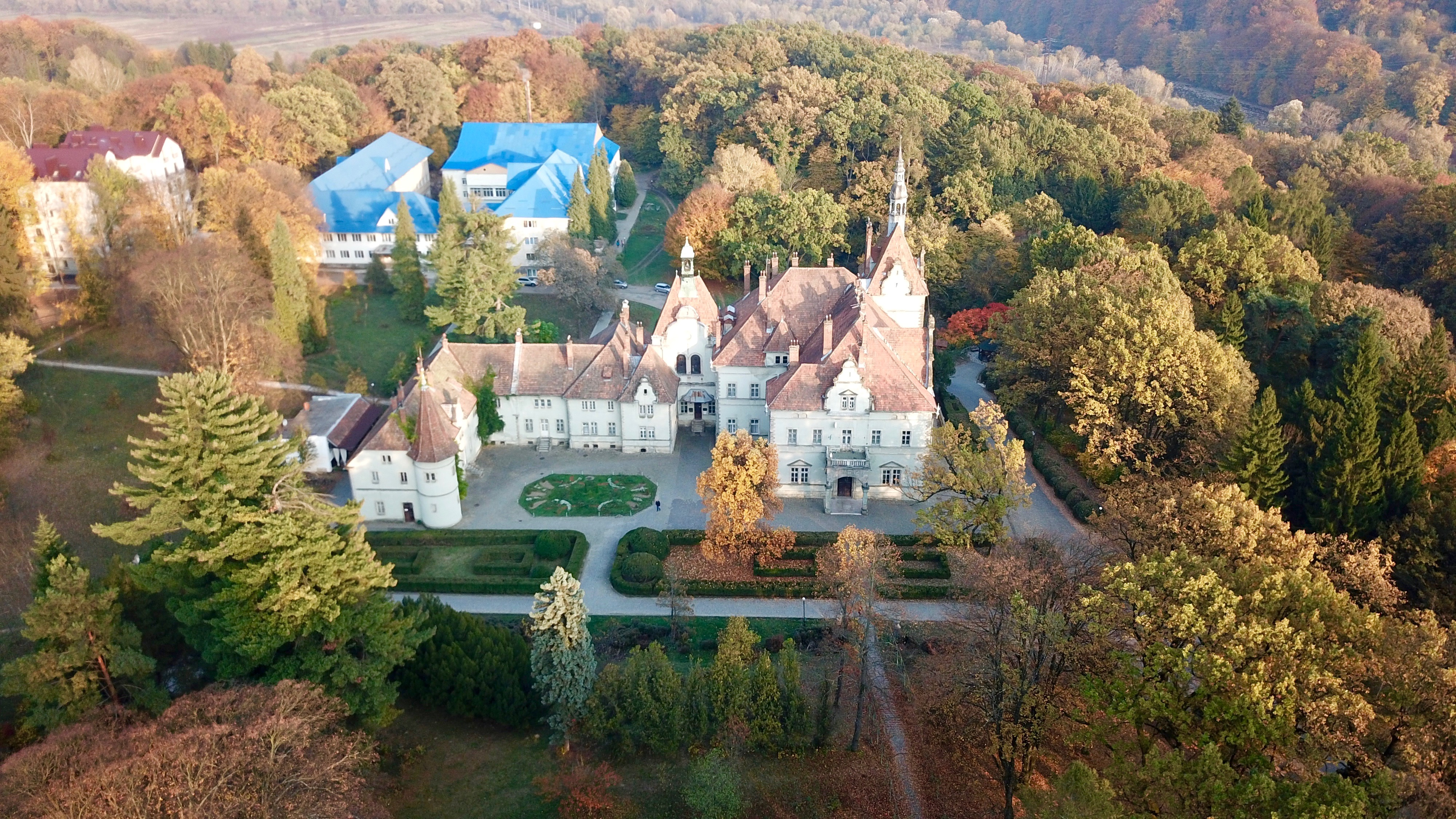

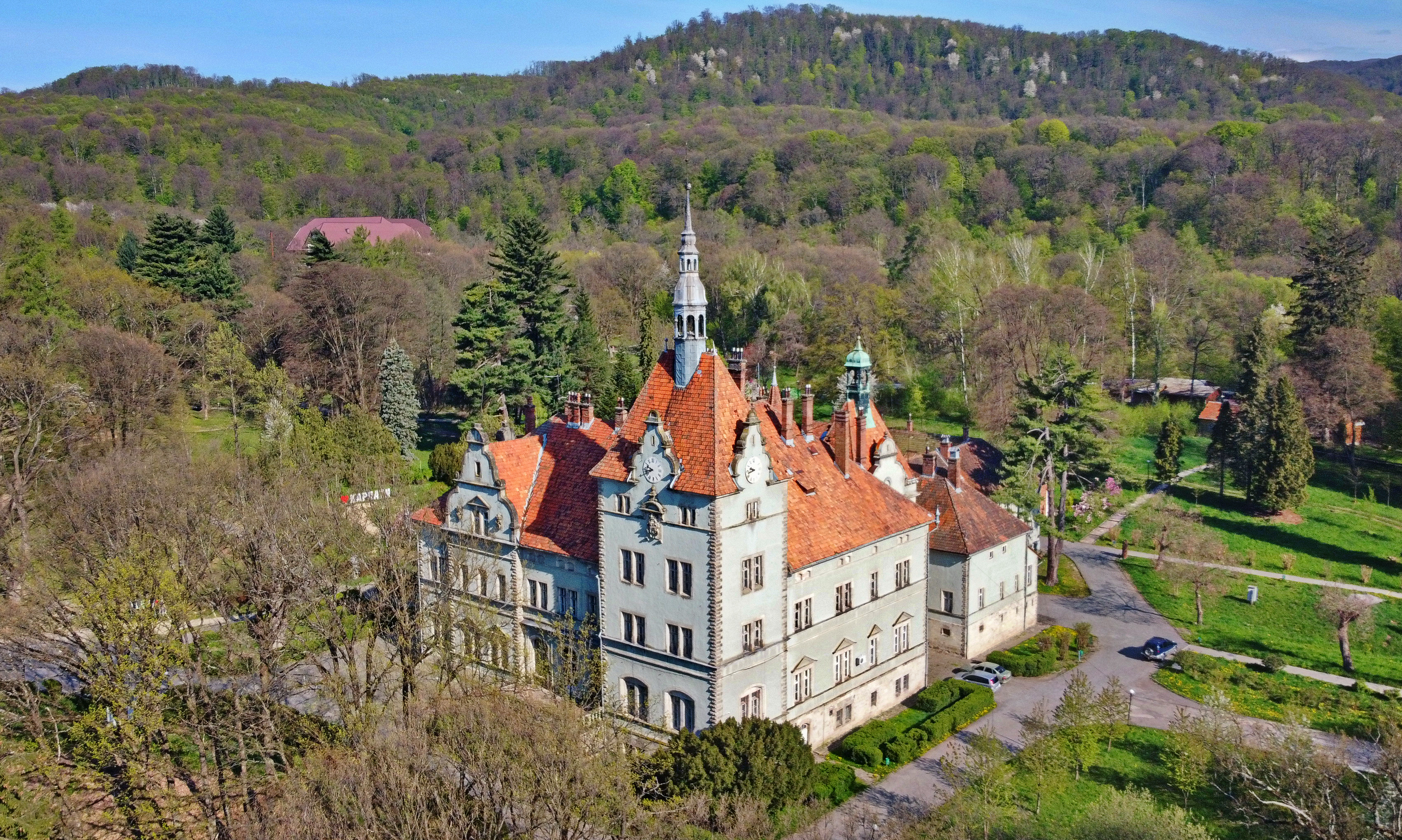

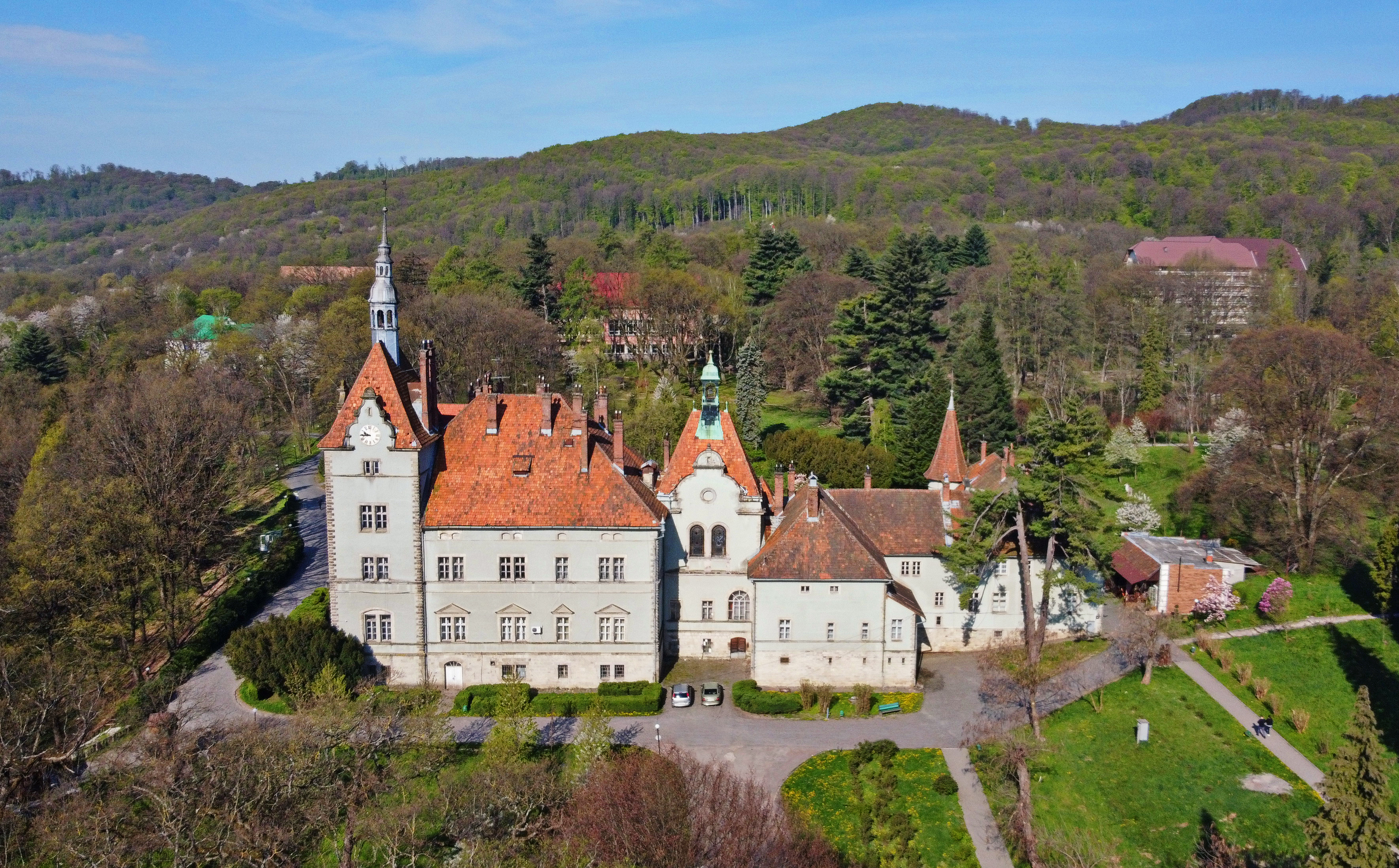

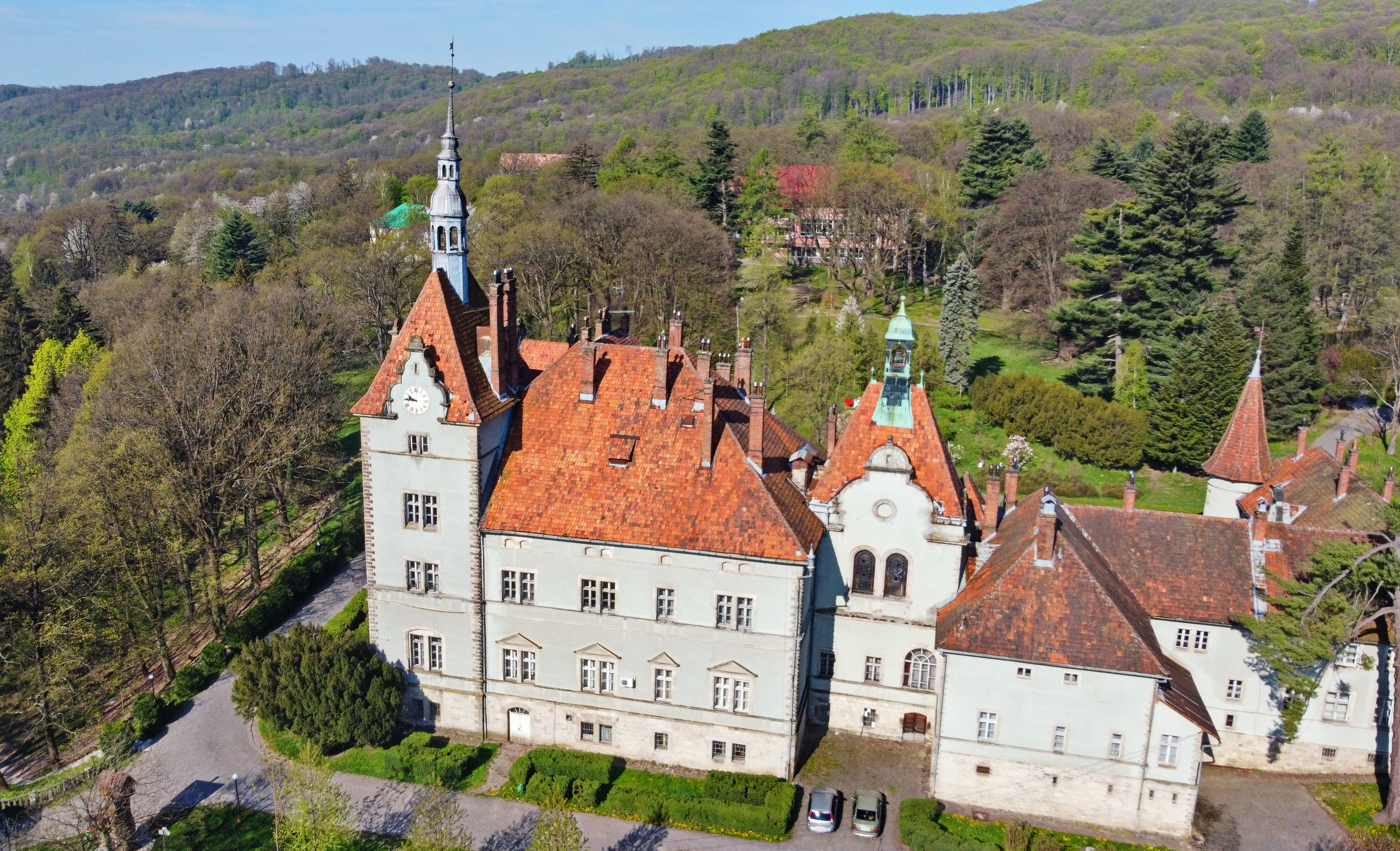

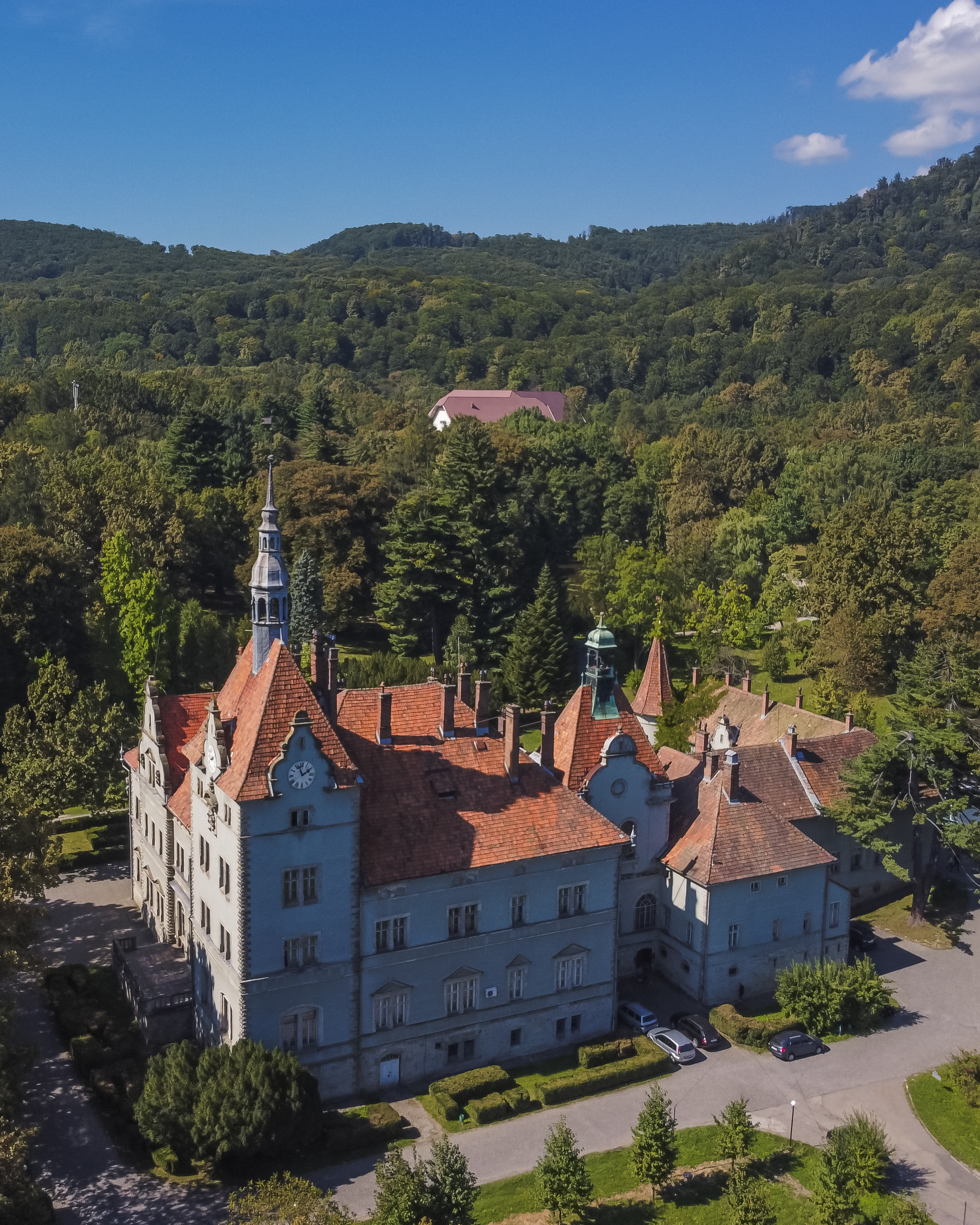

== After the Second World War up to Modern Times ==
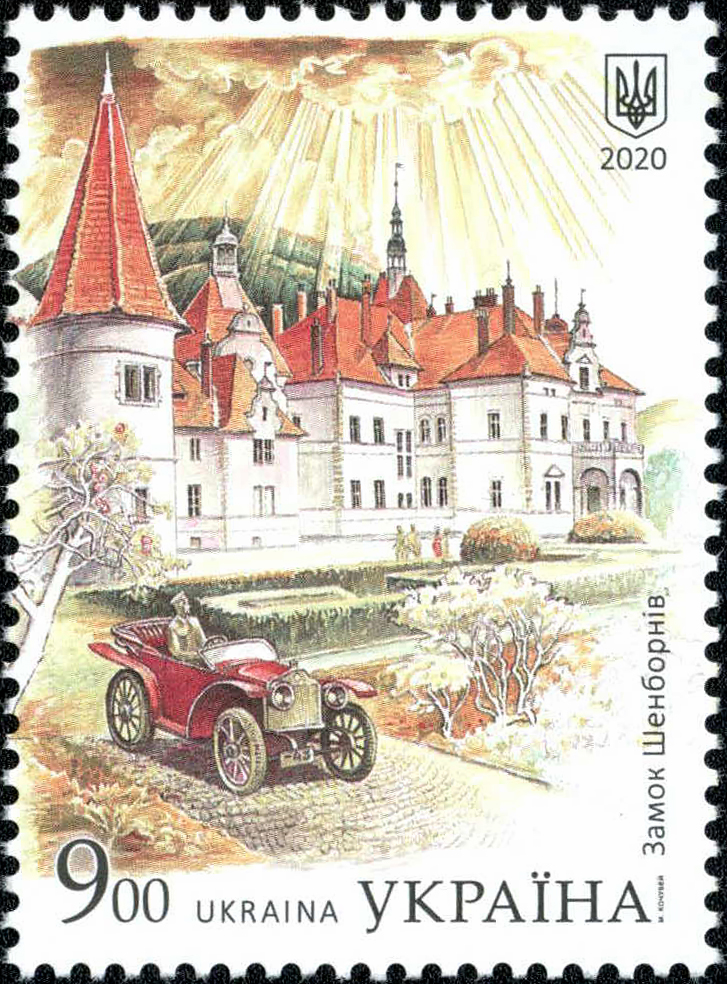
A Ukrainian 2020 stamp depicting the hunting lodge

After the Second World War, the Transcarpathian region was occupied and annexed by the Soviet Union. The palace was confiscated and converted into a rest house. In 1958, following a visit by Nikita Khrushchev, the first climatological sanatorium in Transcarpathia was established on the site, the Karpaty sanatorium, specializing in the treatment of cardiovascular (cardioneurological) diseases. The hunting lodge became the central building of the complex. Since 2010, the sanatorium has expanded its services to include rehabilitation for musculoskeletal disorders, treatment for gastrointestinal conditions, and a department for managing pregnancy pathology.

Parts of the palace’s interior, including furniture and other valuable items, were transferred to the collections of the Uzhhorod Local History Museum.

== Architecture ==
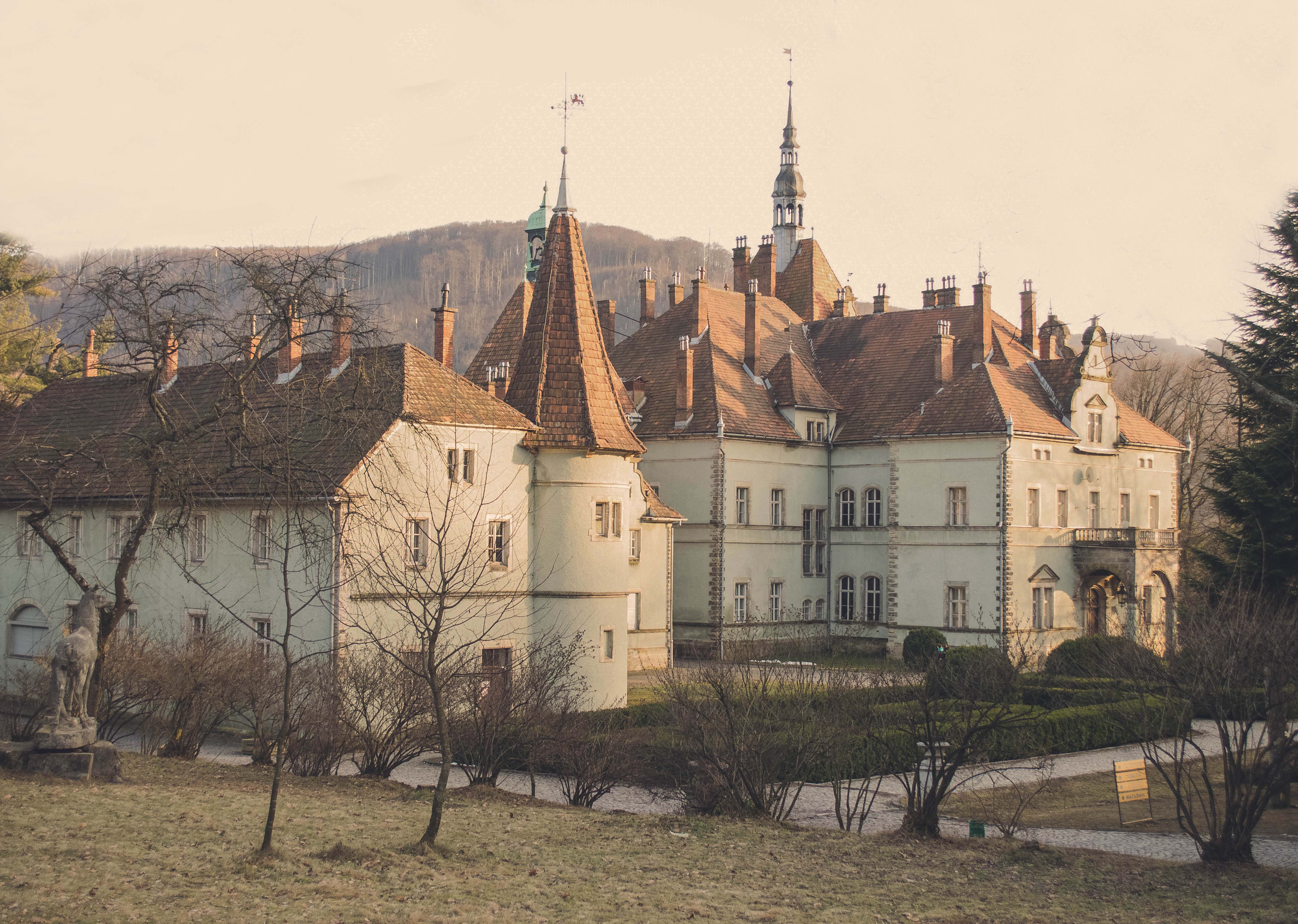
Stained glass reflecting Schönborn heraldry

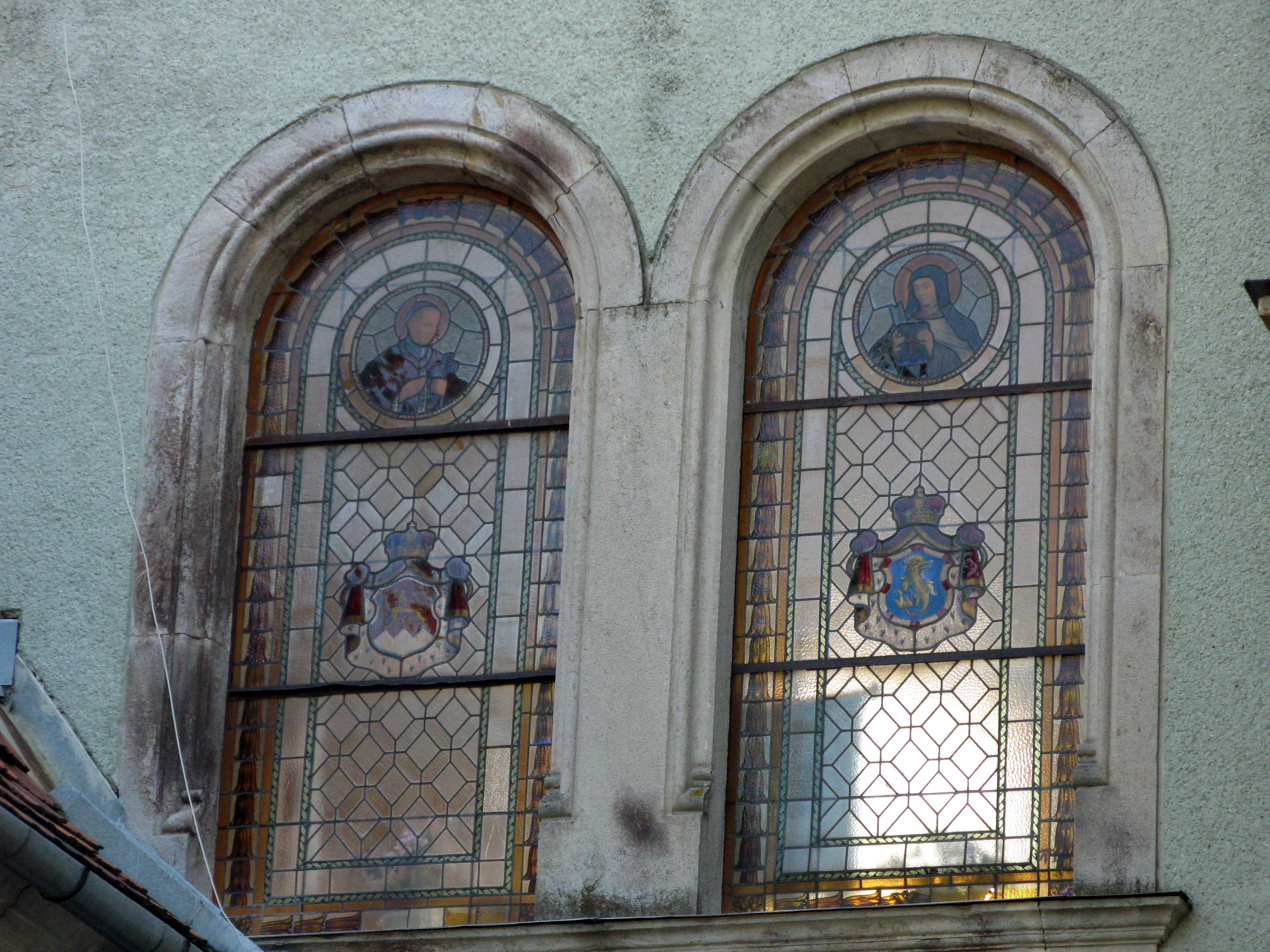
Stained glass reflecting Schönborn heraldry

The hunting lodge was designed by the architect Z. Gresserson in a neo-romantic style, blending Romanesque and Gothic motifs. Constructed from brick and adorned with shaped tiles, its architecture closely resembles the French Renaissance castles of the "age of the musketeers." In this design, every element—whether a chimney, a tower, or other structural features—not only serves its practical purpose but also enhances the building's aesthetic appeal as an ornamental feature.

Interestingly, the palace initially lacked a chapel; in its place was a passageway. The chapel was only added in the early 20th century.

A local legend (unsupported by evidence) claims that the palace has 366 windows (matching the number of days in a leap year, with the 366th window bricked up and reopened every four years), 52 rooms (for the weeks in a year), and 12 entrances (for the months).

The castle is richly decorated with intricate elements, including bas-reliefs, weather vanes, and stained glass, reflecting the Schönborn family heraldry. A tower clock with chimes remains functional. In the palace park, a commemorative plaque (inscribed in Hungarian) and two sculptural compositions—"The Deer" and "The Bear with Cubs"—can be found.

== Gardens ==
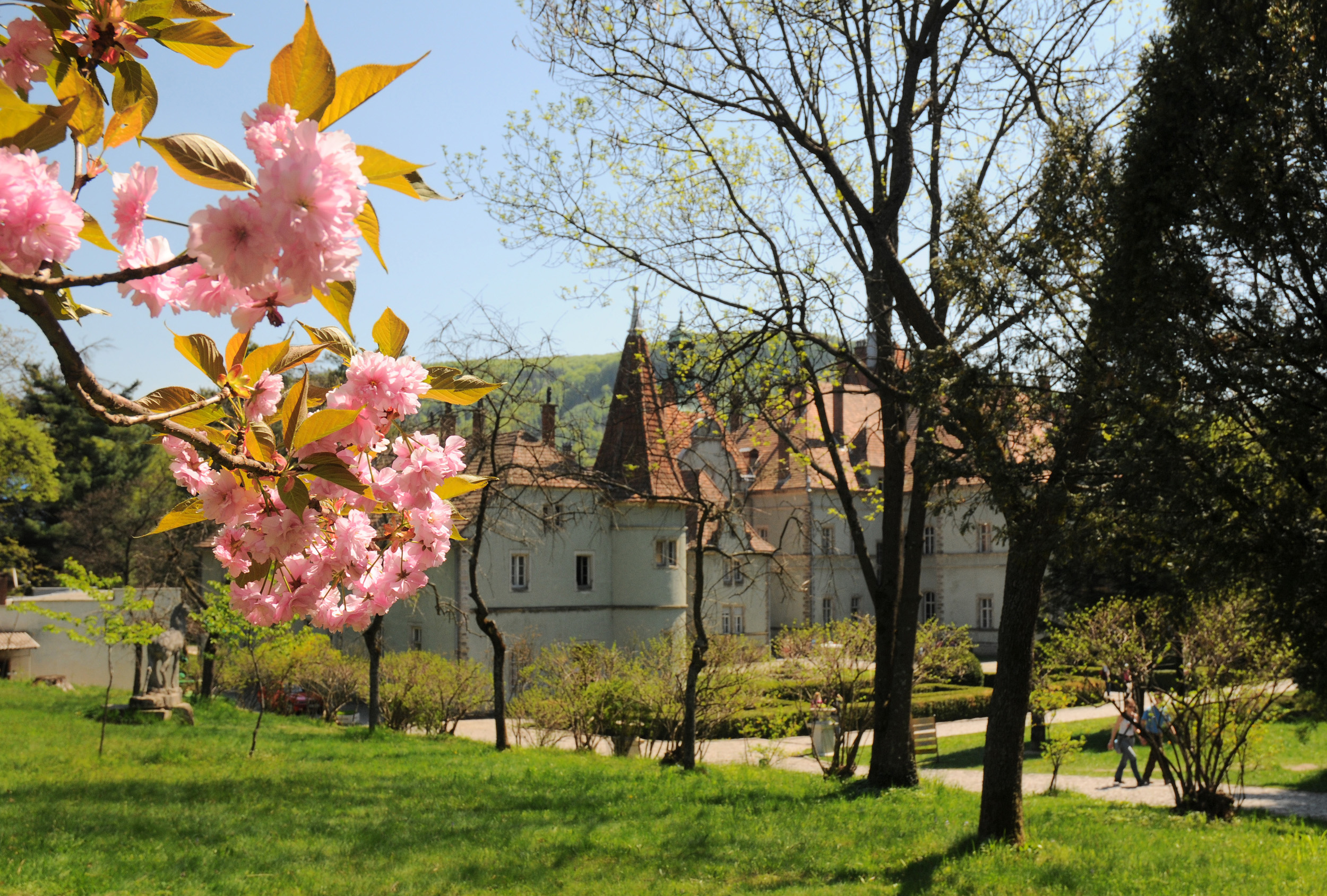
The gardens surrounding the hunting lodge

Near the palace, under the count's direction, a dendrological garden (now the park of the "Karpaty" sanatorium) was created, featuring a decorative lake at its center. Rare tree species were planted, including boxwood, catalpa, Weymouth pine, Canadian spruce, Japanese cherry (sakura), pink beech, and Italian honey locust, as well as shrubs like deutzia and hydrangea. The palace park features a commemorative inscription stone (in Hungarian) and two sculptural compositions: "The Deer" and "The Bear with Cubs." The outline of the pond, dug at the end of the 19th century, was designed to symbolically represent the map of Austria-Hungary.

== See also: other Palaces and Stately Homes of the Counts of Schönborn-Buchheim ==
- Palais Schönborn-Batthyány in Vienna
- Schloss Schönborn
- Schönborn palace (Berehove)
