= Schönborn Palace (Berehove) =

Transcarpathian summer house and winery of the Schönborn family in Ukraine

Coordinates: 48.211153°N 22.658539°E

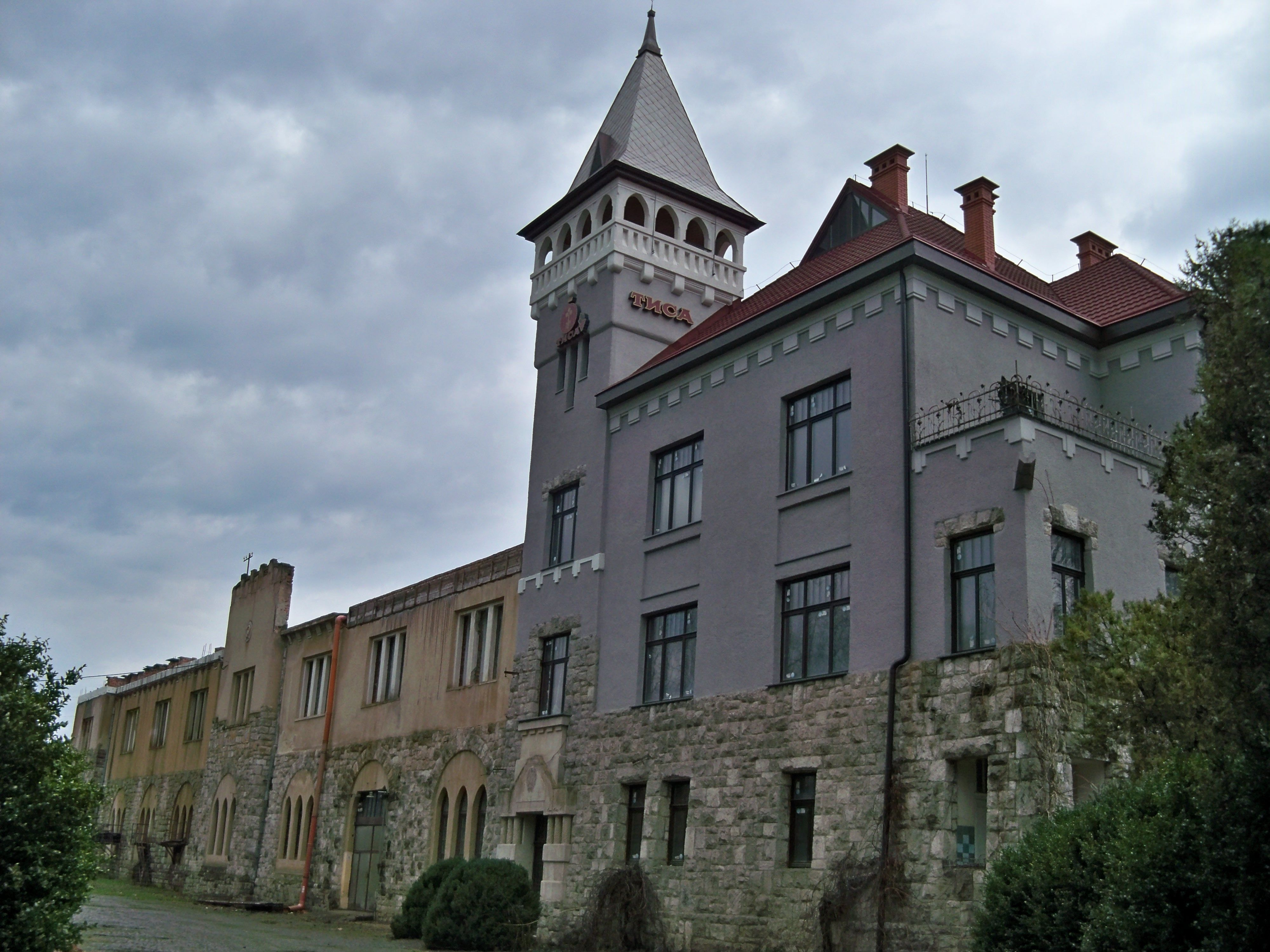
The Schönborn palace in Berehove today

The Schönborn Palace is located in Berehove, a city in Zakarpattia Oblast in western Ukraine, near the Hungary–Ukraine border. Originally built in the 19th century as a summer residence and winery for the Schönborn family, the estate became a symbol of their influence in the region. Following the Second World War, the property was confiscated and repurposed as a state-owned winery. In recent years, however, wine production at the estate has nearly come to a halt.

== History ==
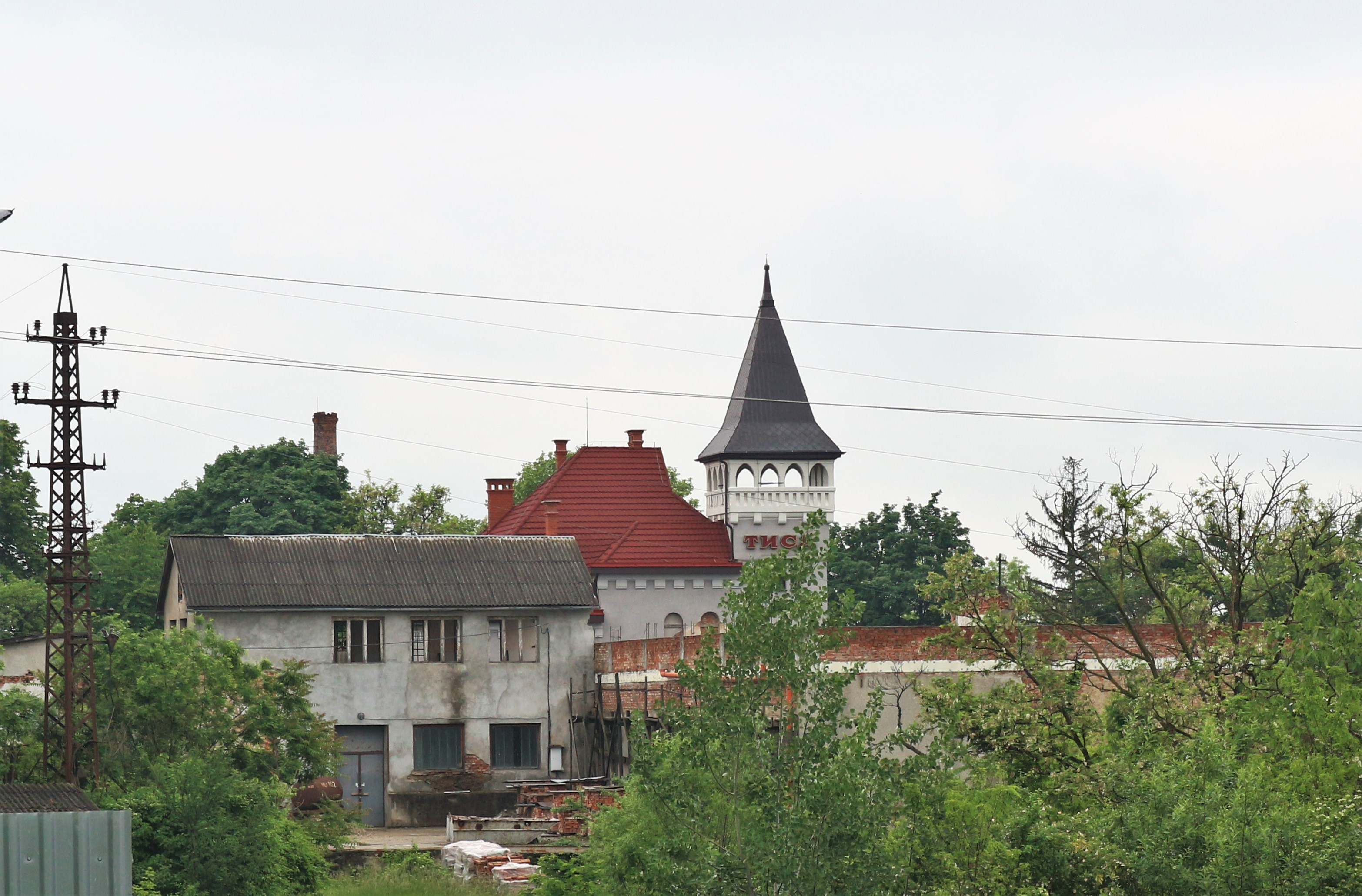
The Schönborn palace in Berehove seen from the side

In 1728, Charles VI, Holy Roman Emperor granted the former estates of Prince Francis II Rákóczi to Lothar Franz von Schönborn (1655–1729), the Archbishop-Elector of Mainz, who had played a key role in defeating Rákóczi. Consequently, the Schönborn family came into possession of Mukacheve, Chynadiyovo, and approximately 200 other villages, including Berehove. The estate, a so-called Majorat, was one of the largest in Eastern Europe.

In 1817, the Mukachevo-Chynadiyovo estate became the property of the Austrian branch of the Schönborn family, the Counts of Schönborn-Buchheim. During the second half of the 19th century, Count Erwein-Friedrich von Schönborn-Buchheim (1842–1903) built a summer residence in Berehove in the neo-romantic style. Situated at the foot of a mountain on the northeastern outskirts of the city, the residence featured a tall tower with a pointed roof, giving it the appearance of a medieval castle. A park was also designed nearby.

In 1913, the Hungarian state established a wine farm at this site, which became the property of the Czechoslovak Union of Winemakers in 1920. In 1954, the state-owned winery "Berehove" was founded in the residence, producing renowned vintage wines such as "Troyanda Zakarpattya," "Promenyste," and "Berehoveske". Today, the winery STOV "Berehoveske" has largely ceased production.

=== Gallery: The Schönborn palace in Berehove in old black and white pictures ===
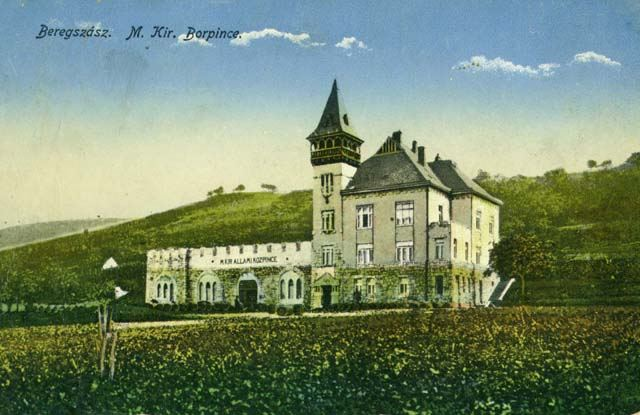

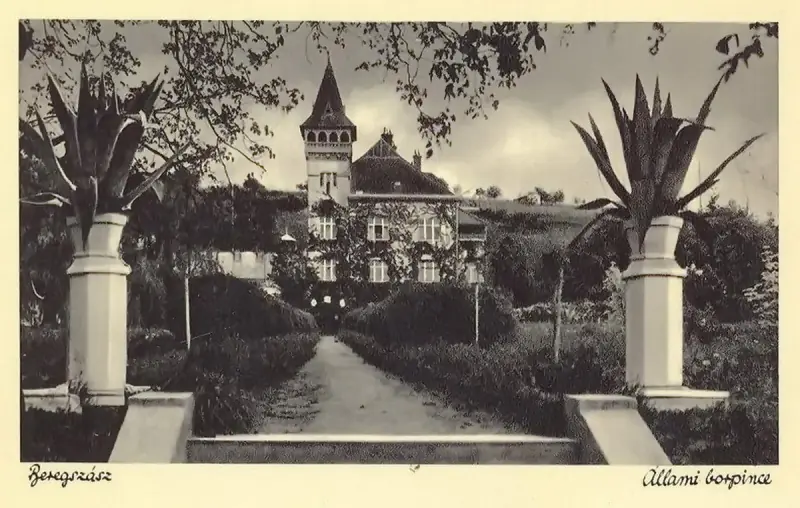

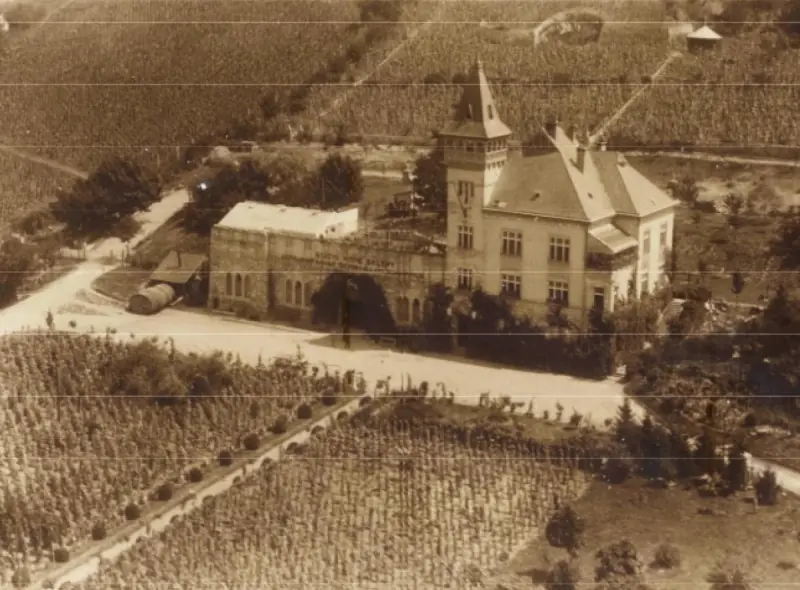

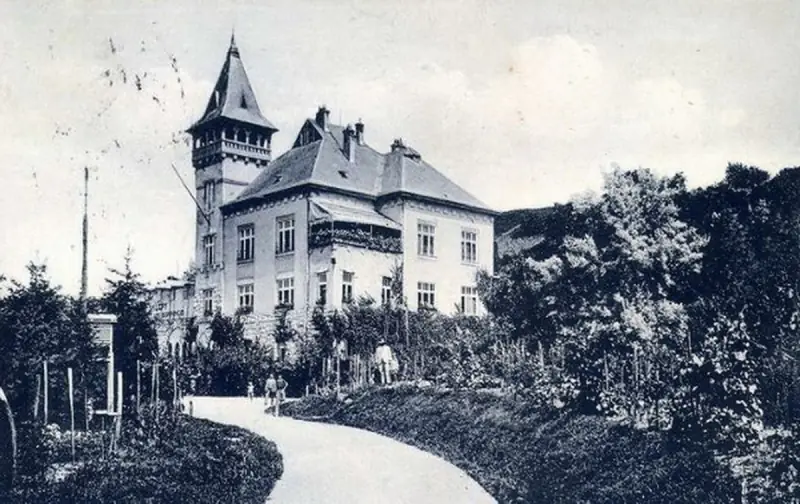

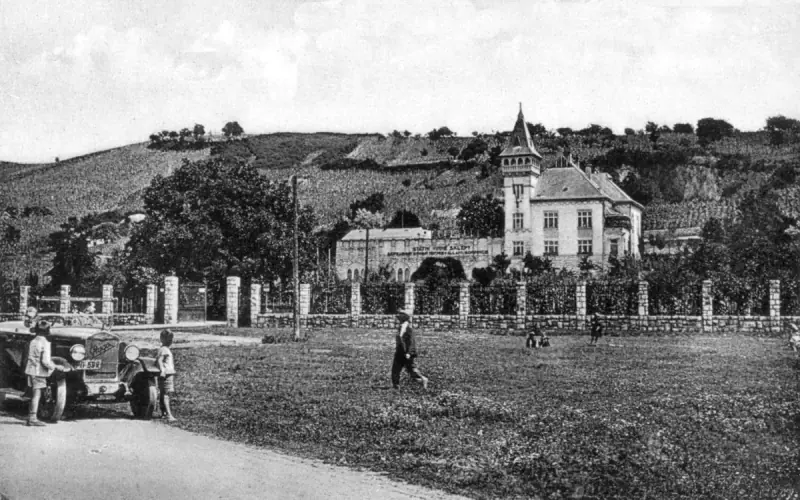

== See also: other Palaces and Stately Homes of the Counts of Schönborn-Buchheim ==
- Palais Schönborn-Batthyány in Vienna
- Schloss Schönborn
- Schönborn palace (Beregvar)
