= Schloss Schönborn =

Baroque style palace of the Schönborn family in Lower Austria

Coordinates: 48°28′20″N 16°08′36″E

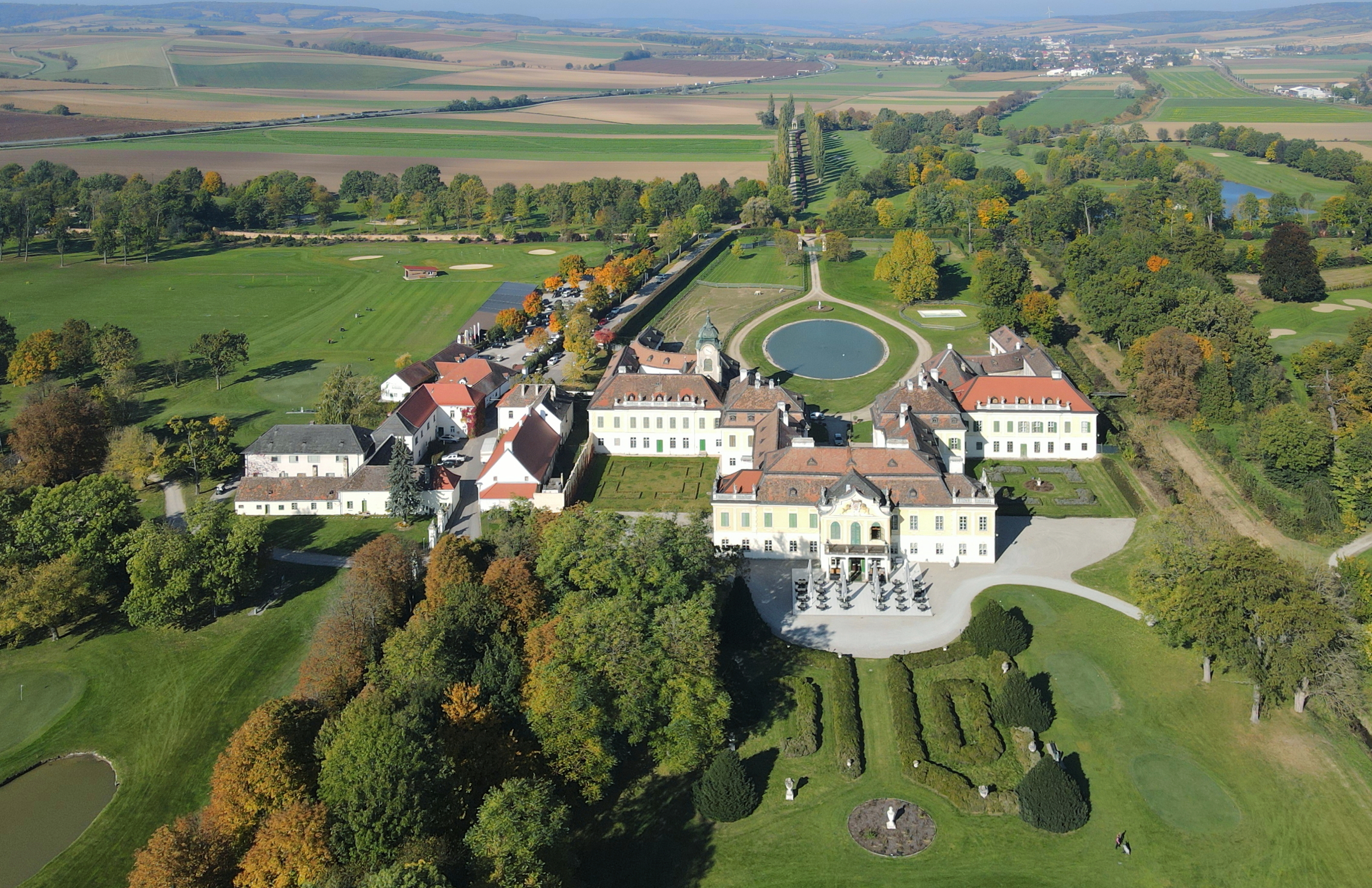
Schloss Schönborn

Schloss Schönborn is a Baroque-style palace located in Göllersdorf, Lower Austria. Originally constructed in the early 18th century by Friedrich Carl von Schönborn, imperial vice-chancellor and a prominent figure of the Austrian nobility, the castle replaced the medieval Mühlburg castle, incorporating elements of its original structure. Designed by the renowned architect Johann Lukas von Hildebrandt, Schloss Schönborn reflects the grandeur and sophistication of aristocratic residences of its time, with its three-wing layout, meticulously crafted interiors, and extensive gardens.

Over the centuries, the palace has served as a noble residence, a hunting retreat, and even a filming location. Despite suffering significant damage and looting during the Russian occupation after the Second World War, the estate has since been restored and partially repurposed. Today, the palace hosts a golf club and restaurant, while remaining under the ownership of the Schönborn family, preserving its legacy as a symbol of Austrian noble heritage and architectural splendor.

== History ==
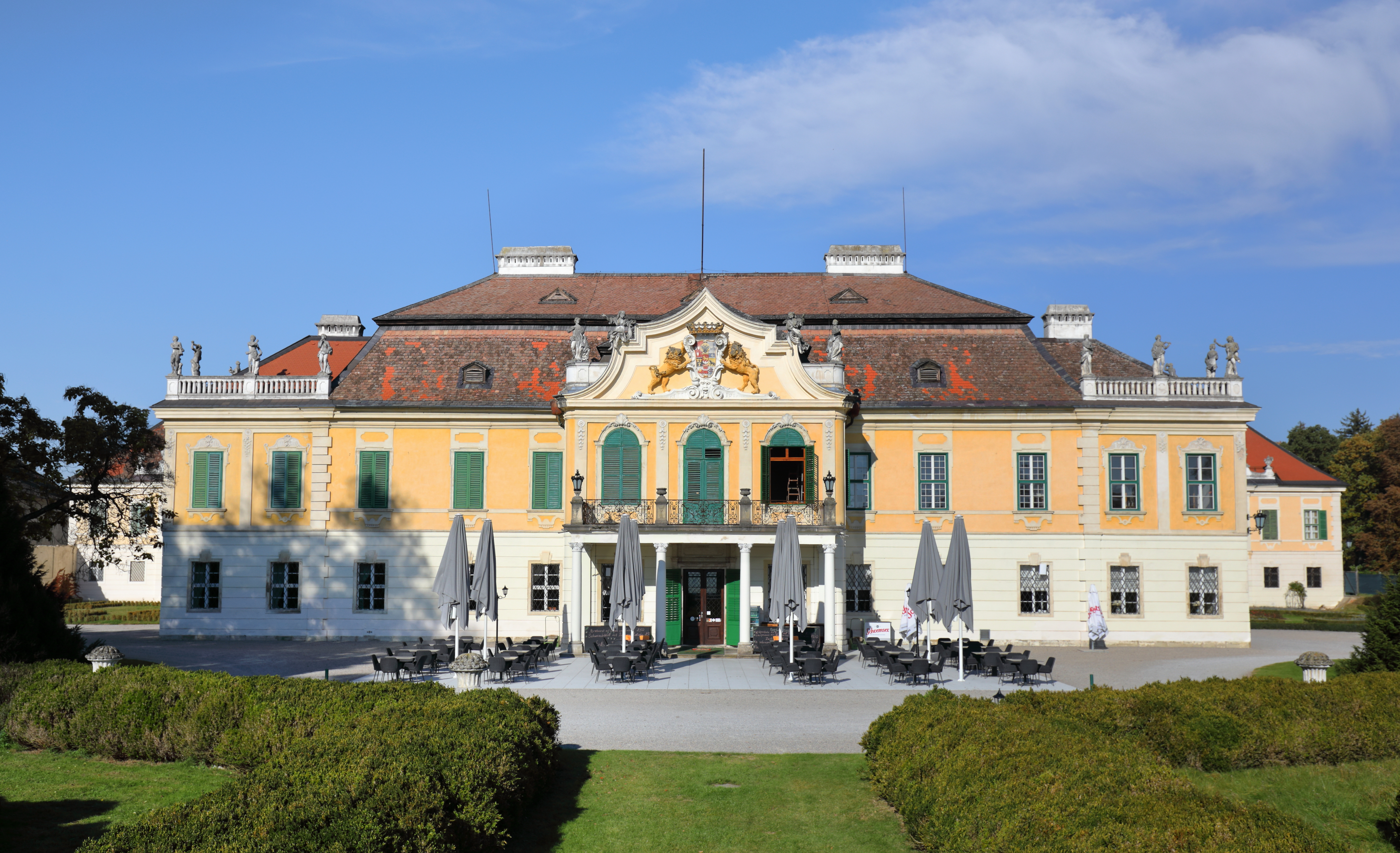
Schloss Schönborn as a modest country manor house

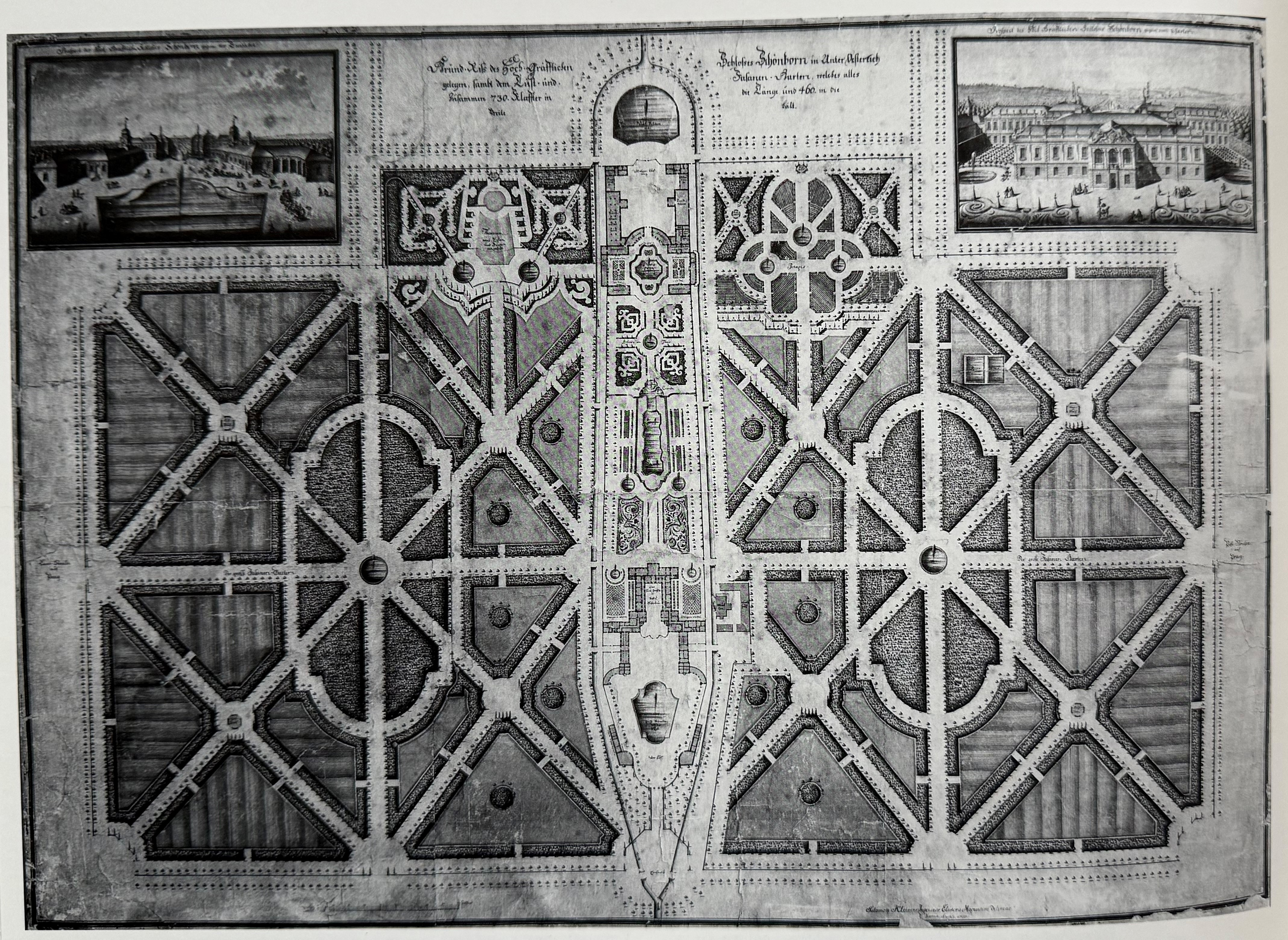
Plan of Schloss Schönborn and its gardens by Salomon Kleiner (1727)

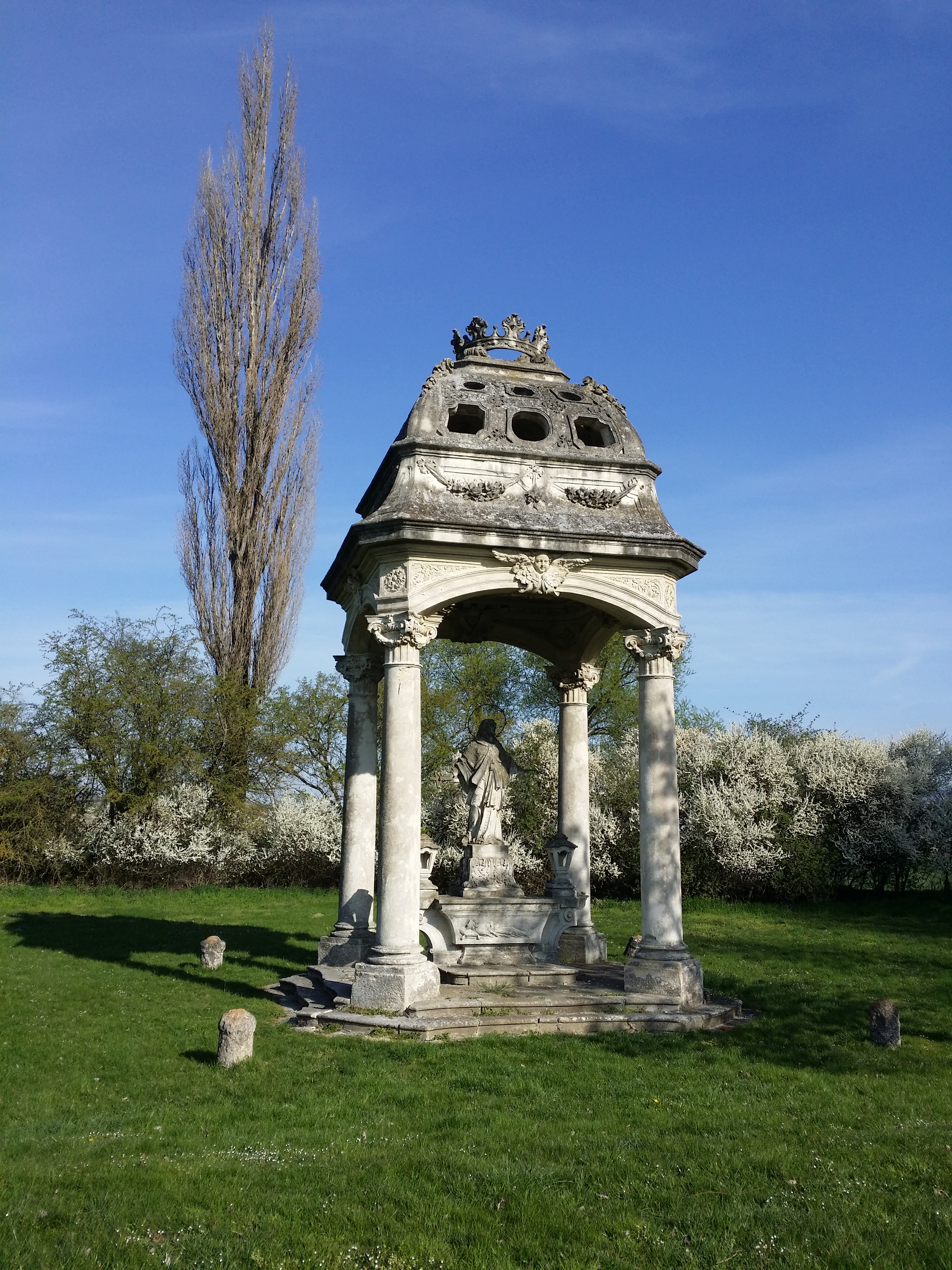
The St. John Nepomuk Chapel

=== Friedrich Carl von Schönborn ===
Melchior Friedrich, Count of Schönborn (1644 – 1717) was a privy councilor of the Electorate of Mainz and Vizedomus of Aschaffenburg, where he commissioned the construction of the Schönborner Hof palace.in 1710, through the mediation of his son Friedrich Carl von Schönborn, who was then serving as Imperial Vice-Chancellor in Vienna, he acquired the estates of Göllersdorf, Mühlberg, and Aspersdorf in Lower Austria from the last Count of Puchheim, Franz Anton von Bucheim, the then Bishop of Wiener Neustadt. The purchase meant entry into the Austrian nobility. The seller then called himself Puchheim-Schönborn, and the buyer's family called themselves Schönborn-Puchheim, later Schönborn-Buchheim. Melchior Friedrich was also awarded the Austrian title of Count.

The Göllersdorf estate primarily served as a summer residence for Melchior's son, the imperial vice-chancellor Friedrich Carl, who in 1715 also acquired the nearby Weyerburg estate in Lower Austria, about 10 km east of Hollabrunn, from the estate of Baron Dominikus von Hochburg.

The existing castle in Göllersdorf, in Weinviertel, was cleared after the construction of the new Schönborn Castle and later sold; today the Republic of Austria operates the Göllersdorf correctional facility on the castle grounds. From 1711 to 1718, shortly after the purchase, Friedrich Carl commissioned the architect Johann Lukas von Hildebrandt to convert the Mühlberg castle, which was located on the property, into a representative country house. Hildebrandt was supported by the architect Maximilian von Welsch, who primarily focused on the water works.

Friedrich Carl lived in Vienna, where from 1717 to 1719, he had the Secret Court Chancellery (now the Federal Chancellery of Austria) constructed as his official residence. From 1723 to 1730, he also oversaw the reconstruction of the Imperial Chancellery Wing of the Wiener Hofburg, where he primarily resided. Additionally, he privately renovated the Blauer Hof in Laxenburg and built the Schönborn Palace in the Laudongasse in Vienna in 1706. In 1740, he remodeled the Palais Schönborn-Batthyány on Vienna's Renngasse. In 1729, he was elected Prince-Bishop of Bamberg, and in 1734, Prince-Bishop of Würzburg. Only years later did he leave Vienna to move to his principalities, where he completed the Würzburg Residence and had Werneck palace built between 1733 and 1745.

Architect Johann Lucas von Hildebrandt designed a three-wing complex with an extensive garden, orangery and castle chapel. In 1715, a pavilion of the orangery was decorated with frescoes by Jonas Drentwett. Salomon Kleiner created a series of drawings documenting the layout of the estate. Between 1729 and 1733, Hildebrandt built a St. John Nepomuk Chapel on the northwest edge of the extensive palace park.

=== The Austrian Schönborns ===
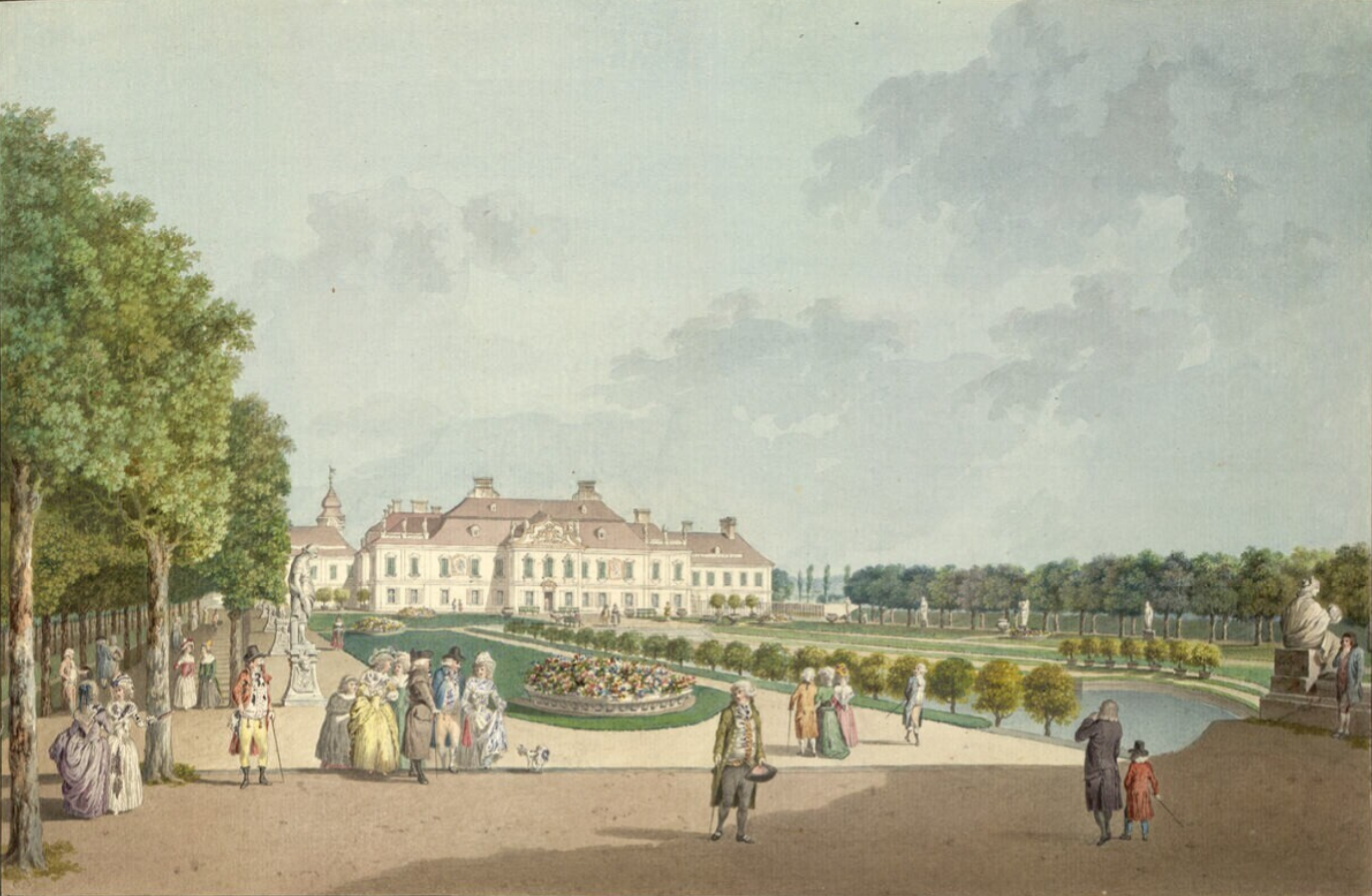
Schloss Schönborn by Lorenz Janscha (1810)

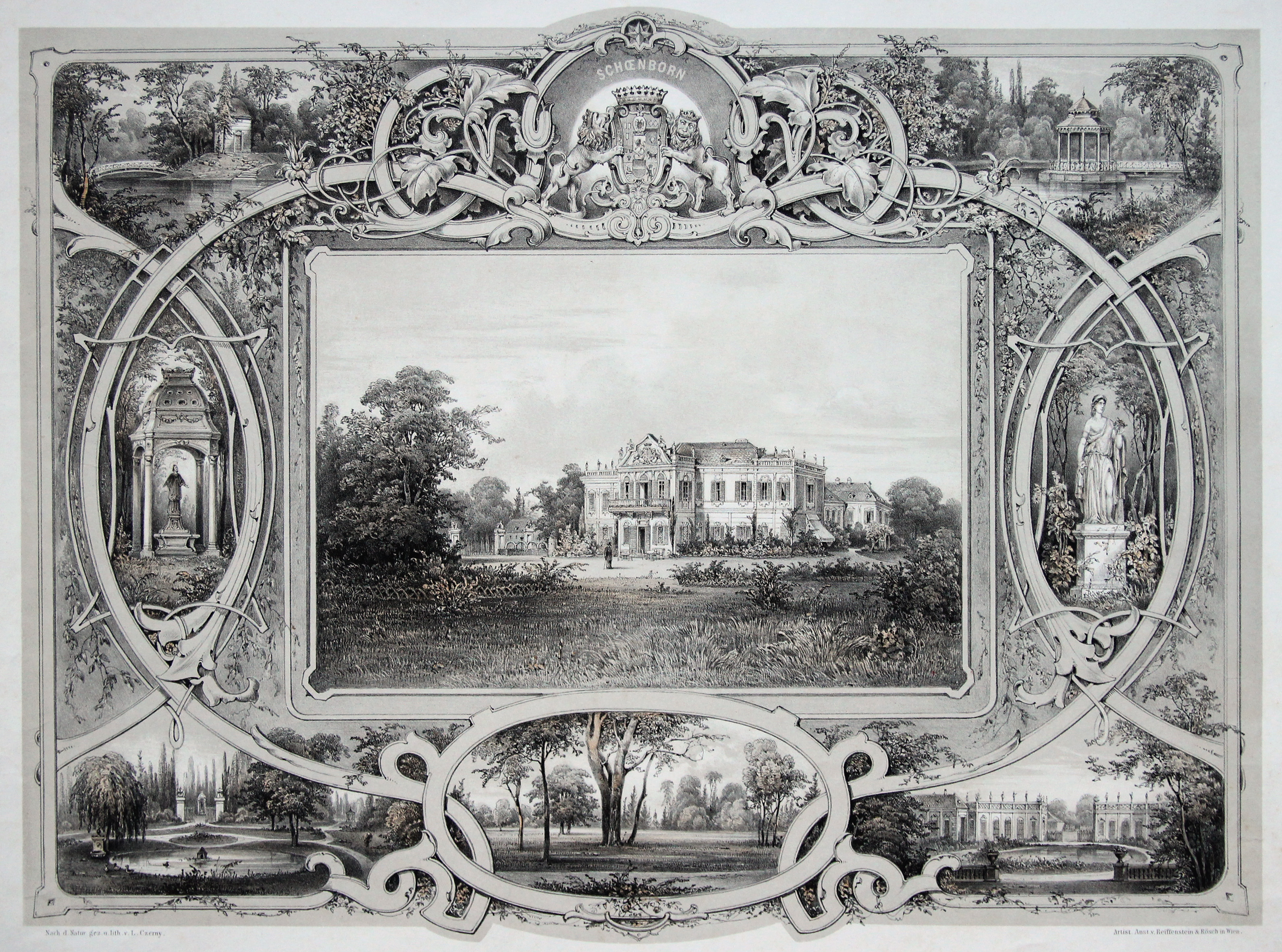
Schloss Schönborn and gardens (1854)

The Prince-Bishop's heir as owner of the Austrian Buchheim majorat was his nephew, Eugen Erwein von Schönborn-Heusenstamm (1727–1801), who lived in Vienna and neglected the palace. Since he had no son, the Austrian majorat and the Franconian County of Heussenstamm passed to a cousin's son, Hugo (1739–1817). Hugo divided his time between the Schönborner Hof in Mainz, the Franconian palaces of Wiesentheid and Weißenstein in Pommersfelden, and Vienna. Therefore, he also rarely used the palace. It was only when his sons divided the properties that the Austrian branch of the Schönborn family emerged under Franz Philipp von Schönborn-Buchheim (1768–1841) and assumed ownership of the palace. The estate has remained in the hands of the family to this day.

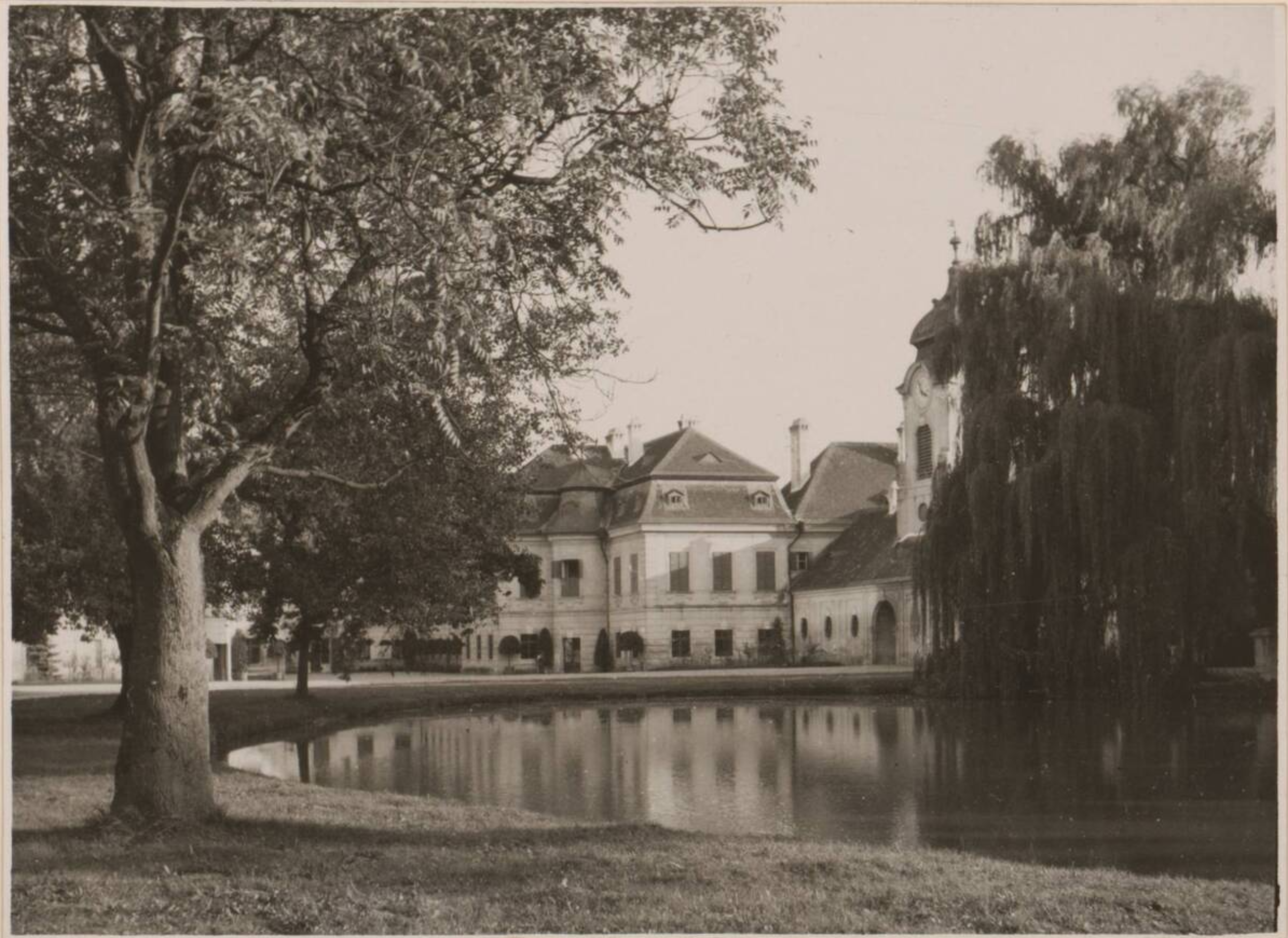
Schloss Schönborn (1933)

The palace was inhabited by the family until the First World War. During the interwar period, it became the venue for renowned car races. The living and reception rooms were impeccably furnished.

=== Second World War, Russian Occupation, and Modern Times ===
At the end of Second World War in 1945, the family relocated most of the castle's furnishings to the west and took refuge in Sankt Gallenkirch in Montafon. Only the elderly Countess Elise stayed behind, dying in early July. The Kunsthistorisches Museum in Vienna moved many valuable items to the upper floors of the palace. During the final weeks of the war, with the front line only a few kilometers away, many rooms were used as a hospital for the German Wehrmacht. Eighteen German and two Russian soldiers were buried in the pheasant garden. Units of the SS and the Red Army looted the palace.

In the years following the Second World War, Schloss Schönborn suffered the same fate as most noble estates in northern Lower Austria. It was devastated and looted again by Russian occupation soldiers. Virtually nothing remained of the once-rich library, archive, painting collection, and porcelain collection.

Lacking funds and prospects, the palace remained neglected even after the departure of the Russians. Its salvation came through a new purpose. In 1988, parts of the palace and its 104-hectare park were leased by a golf club. The excellently restored main building now houses the clubhouse and a restaurant. Restoration work on the extensive castle grounds is expected to continue for several more years.

== Palace Park ==
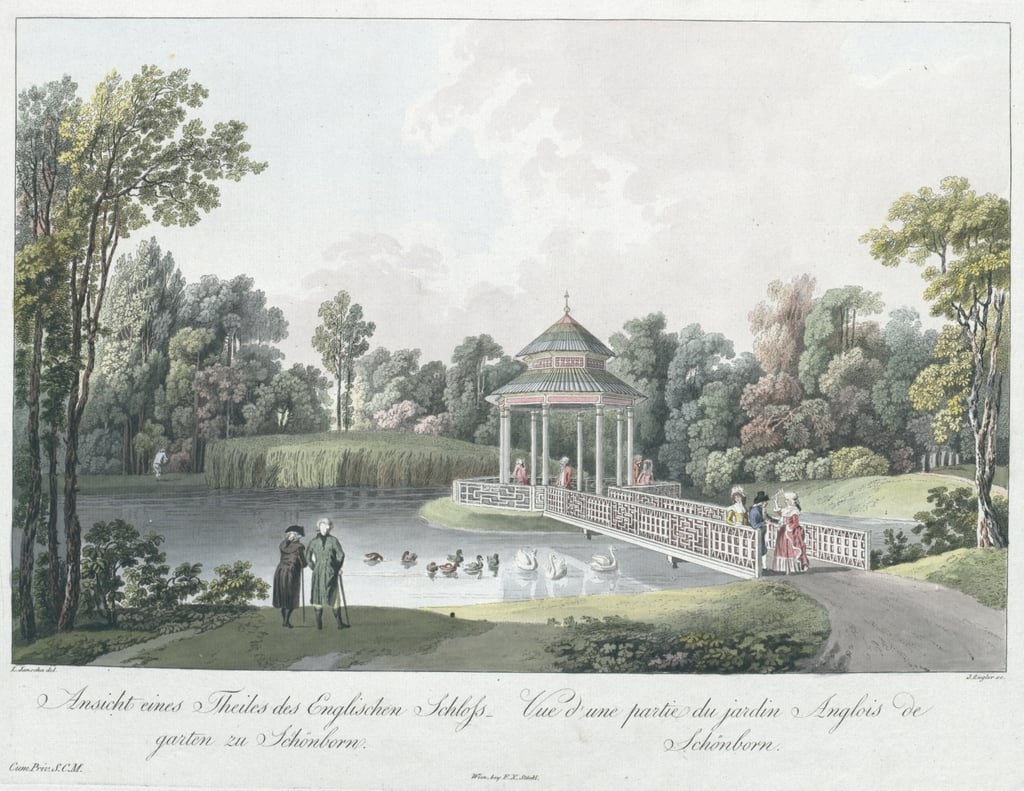
The English landscape garden of Schloss Schönborn (1810)

The palace park, an unusual design by Hildebrandt and Maximilian von Welsch, covers an area of approximately 104 hectares, including some ancient trees. The park also features the Nepomuk Chapel, another of Hildebrandt's works. Between 1790 and 1800, Eugen Franz Count Schönborn-Buchheim had an English garden with a large pond laid out in the northern part of the park. A Chinese pavilion on an island served as a shelter. Despite modifications to accommodate a golf course, the park remains one of Austria's most significant garden monuments and is listed under the country's monument protection laws.

== Architecture ==
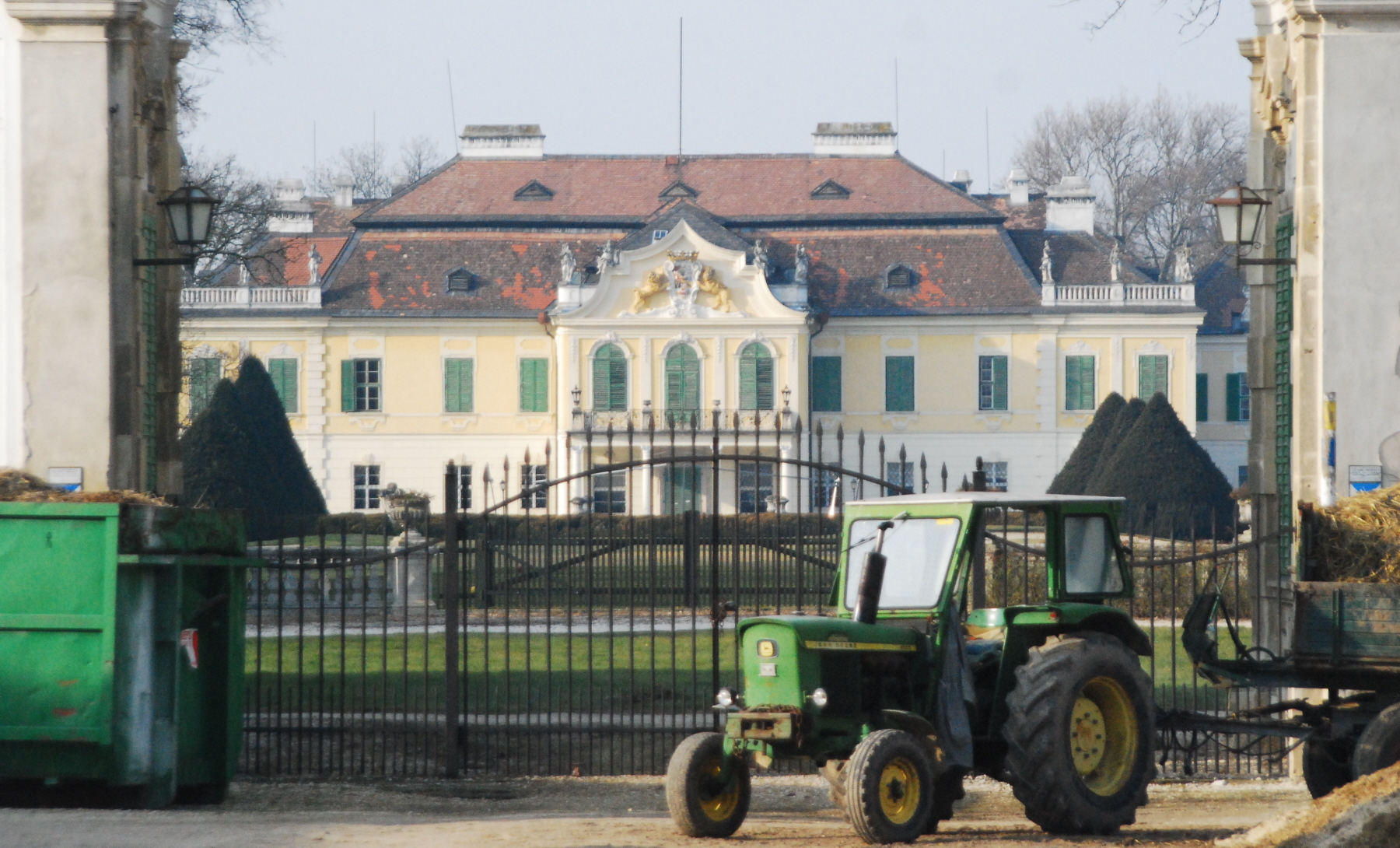
Schloss Schönborn

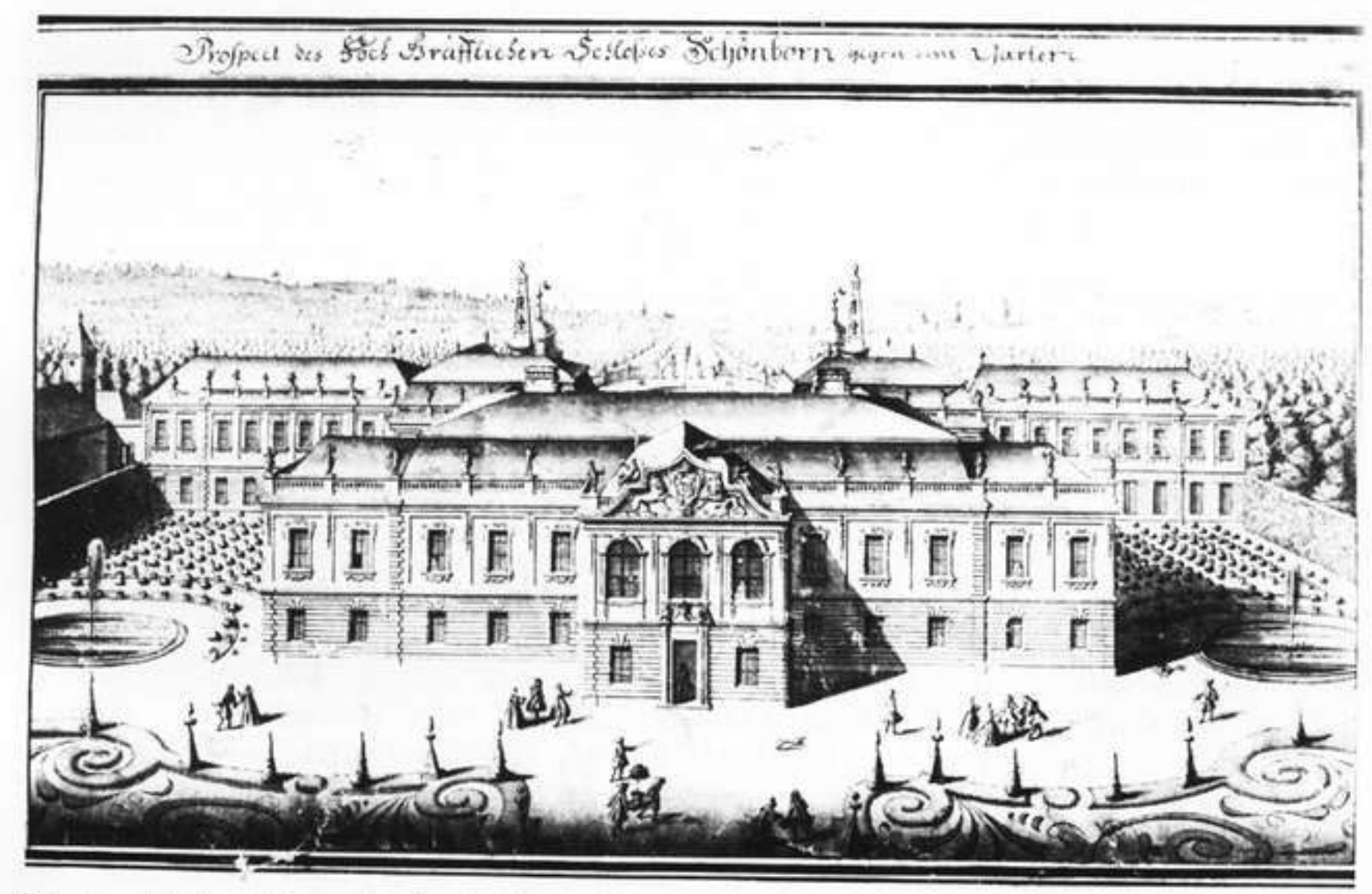
Schloss Schönborn by Salomon Kleiner (1727)

=== Interpretation ===
Schloss Schönborn is the successor to the old Buchheim Mühlburg castle and retains the character of a noble residence. The newly constructed palace of the imperial vice-chancellor provides a representative setting for a noble household, as evidenced by its exterior and interior design. This is reflected in the interior spaces of the palace, including the main hall, the staircase, the galleries, the antechambers, and the apartments. Following the model of grand princely residences, the interior layout is organized in a hierarchical sequence of rooms appropriate to the owner's rank. The palace's design and its reference to Château de Clagny near Versailles emphasize its residential aspirations. In a similar fashion, Schloss Schönborn was conceived as a residence for Count Schönborn, rather than as an official residence for the imperial vice-chancellor.

In addition to serving as a "manor house with estate management" and a residence, Schloss Schönborn primarily functioned as a private retreat and hunting lodge for the count, as evidenced by the pheasantry and associated gardens. Friedrich Carl did not maintain a court in Göllersdorf in his capacity as imperial vice-chancellor but rather as a private individual

=== The construction ===
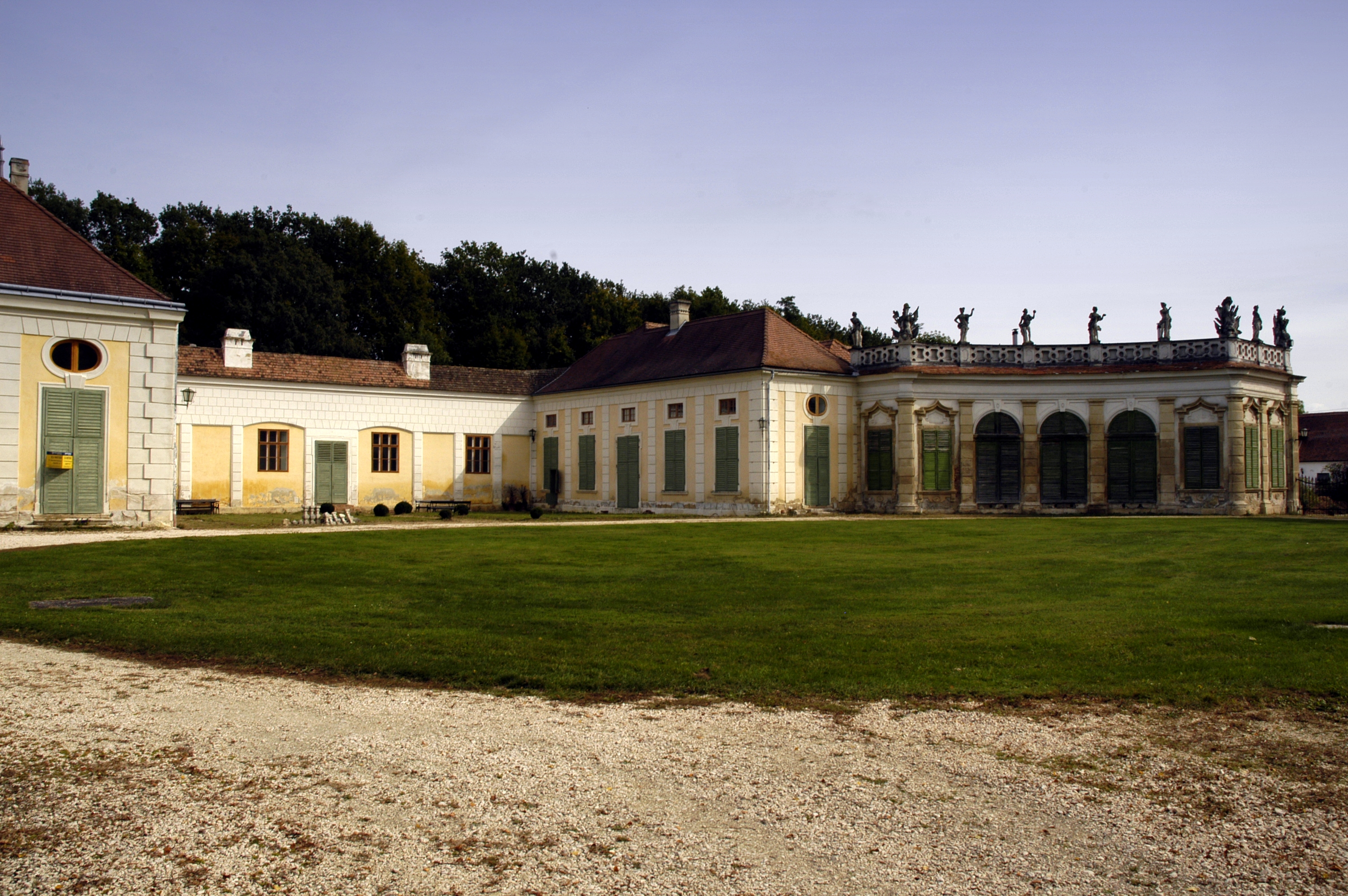
The orangery of Schloss Schönborn

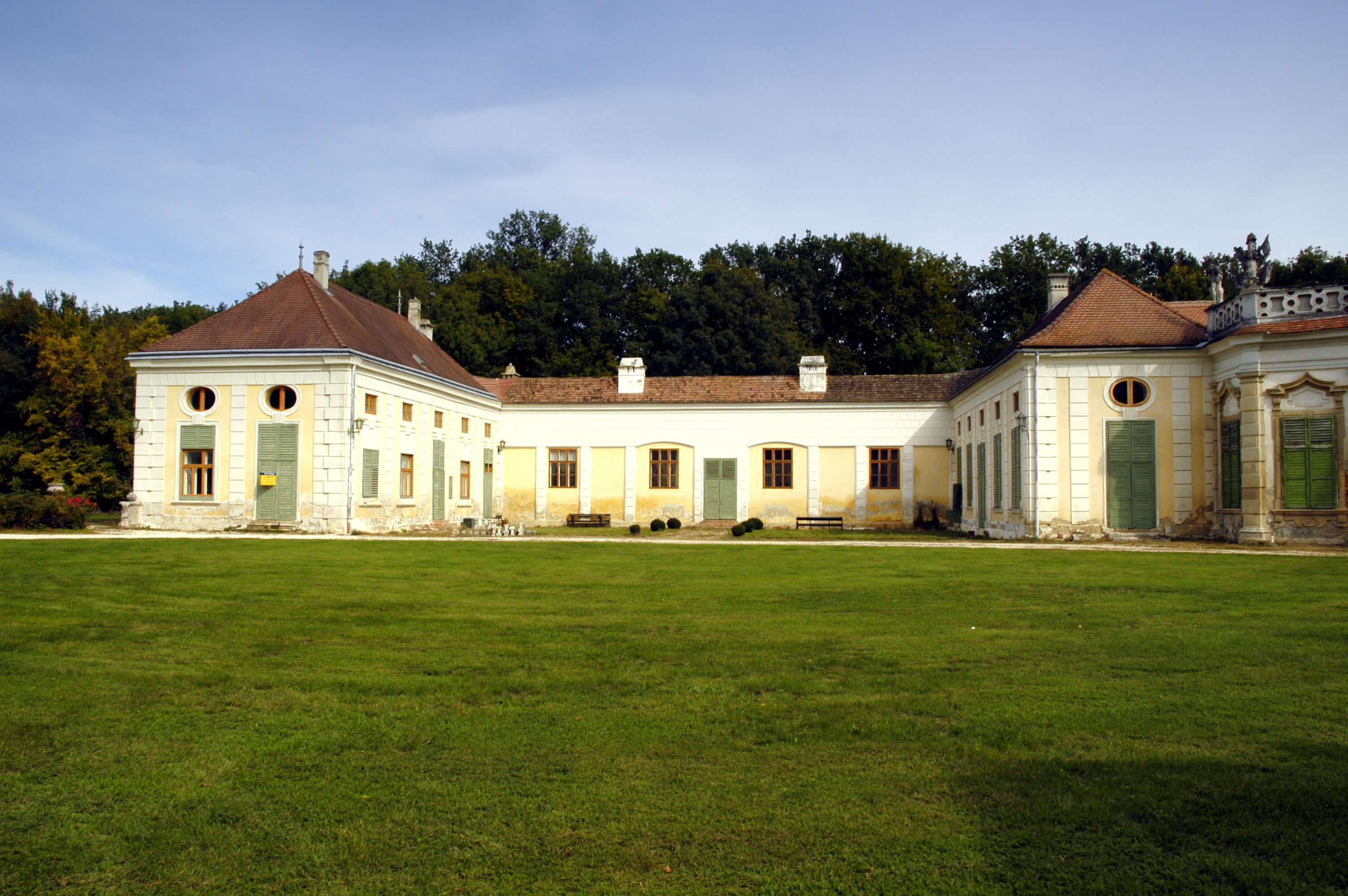
Another view of the orangery

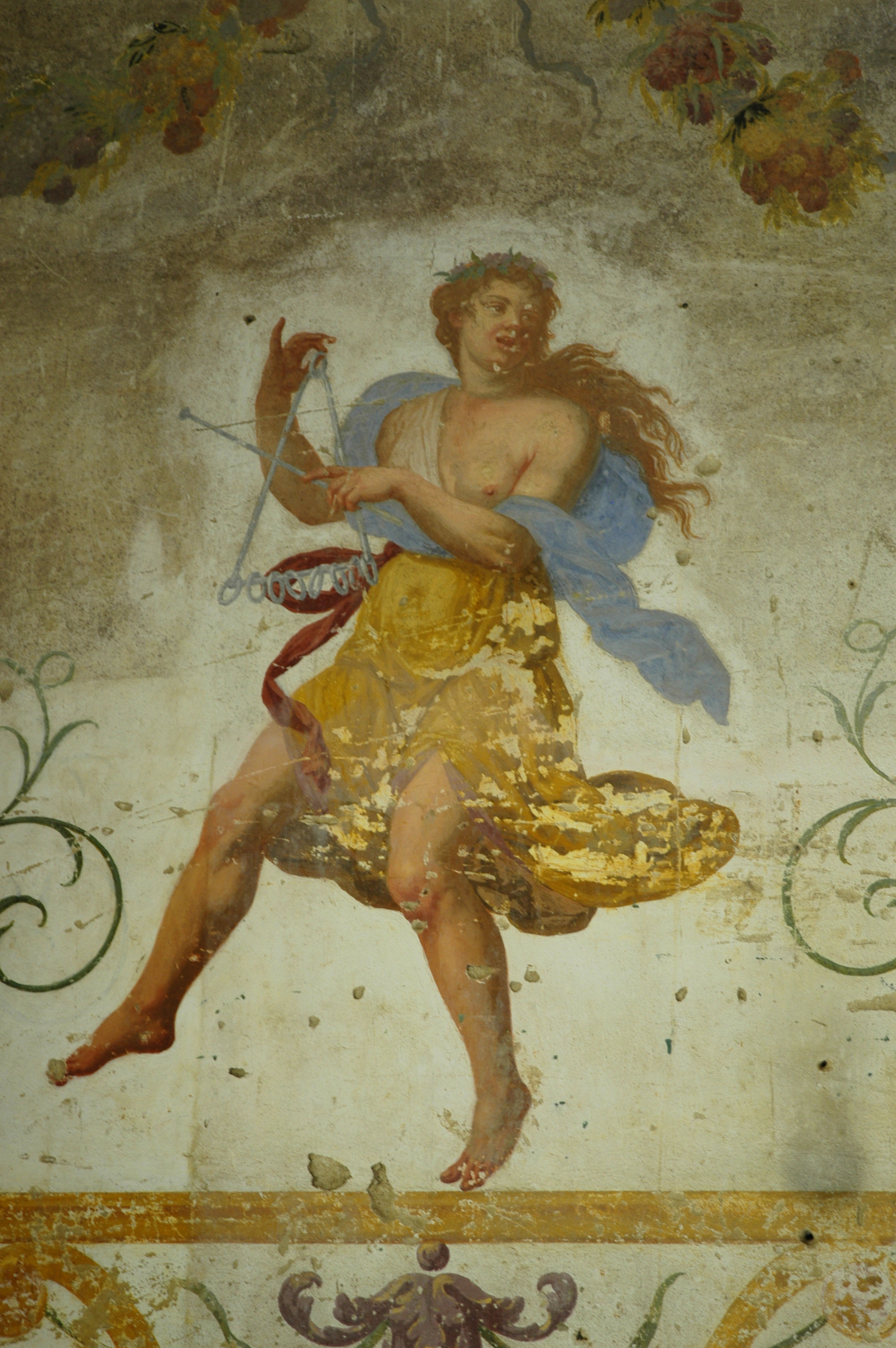
One of the frescoes inside the orangery

With the acquisition of the estate, Friedrich Carl von Schönborn had firmly established himself within the Austrian nobility. Such a status required maintenance and preservation through adherence to old traditions and the upkeep of inherited estates. For this reason, the foundations of the former Mühlburg castle were incorporated into the reconstruction of the palace and integrated into its floor plan. By taking this approach, the count created an architectural monument that aligned with the traditions of the Austrian aristocracy.

In the building's structure, remnants of the old Mühlburg are identifiable by their increased wall thickness. The inner courtyard, which feels narrow and confining, contrasts sharply with the spaciously designed outer courtyard. Johann Lucas von Hildebrandt prepared two different plans for Schloss Göllersdorf, known in the literature as Project I and Project II. Project I proposed a modern winged structure with two stories. The courtyard façade was to feature a broad, risalit-like design to dominate the courtyard ensemble. Stables were to be separated from the main castle and arranged around a detached outer courtyard.

While financial and economic considerations played a role in the decision not to pursue Project I, the more significant factor was the Schönborn family's strong sense of tradition, which required incorporating older structural elements of the predecessor building into the redesign.

The implemented Project II retained the layout of the inner courtyard from the old Mühlburg. This plan reflected a balance between the expectations of a contemporary, expansive castle complex and the preservation of a noble residence's historical essence.

By autumn 1712, the building had been restored, its interior restructured, and a new roof added. In summer 1713, stucco work in the main hall was completed, and by autumn, an additional twelve rooms had been decorated with stucco. Two pavilions were added to the three-winged core structure. For the interior decoration, frescoes by Jonas Drentwett were completed in July 1714 in the Sala terrena and in June 1715 in the chapel and library.

By autumn 1716, the castle was fully completed, and the masons shifted their efforts to constructing the orangery. This expansive structure, also designed by Hildebrandt, represents a masterpiece of garden architecture and forms its own small ensemble, echoing the layout of the main building. Situated on slightly elevated terrain, it consists of a rectangular complex of single-story buildings enclosing two courtyards.

An undated engraving of Schönborn Castle shows that the construction, in its current form, was completed in at least two phases. The three-winged structure appears to be connected to the outer wings solely through gateway buildings. These outer wings curve outward in a quarter-circle around the central basin, with gate towers situated on their axes, framing the overall design.

== Today ==
The palace remains in the ownership of the Schönborn family (Friedrich Karl Schönborn-Buchheim Sr.). The estate's administration, Schönborn-Buchheim, is housed in the outbuildings, while the family resides at Weyerburg Castle.

The property was used as a filming location for the boarding school in the 1983 TV series Der Trotzkopf, starring Anja Schüte in the lead role. The television production is based on the books Der Trotzkopf and Trotzkopfs Brautzeit by Emmy von Rhoden.

A golf course was opened in the palace park in 1989 and has won international awards. Two thirds of the complex is located on the palace park grounds and blends harmoniously into the historic park. The Schloss Schönborn Golf Club uses the palace as a clubhouse for the golf course.

== Literature ==
- Helmut-Eberhard Paulus: Die Orangerie von Schloss Schönborn in Göllersdorf und ihre ikonologische Deutung. In: Die Gartenkunst 15 (1/2003), S. 28–52.
- Helmut-Eberhard Paulus: Die Schönbornschlösser in Göllersdorf und Werneck. Nürnberg 1982.

== See also: other Palaces and Stately Homes of the Counts of Schönborn-Buchheim ==
- Palais Schönborn-Batthyány in Vienna
- Schönborn palace (Berehove)
- Schönborn palace (Beregvar)
