= Palais Schönborn-Batthyány =

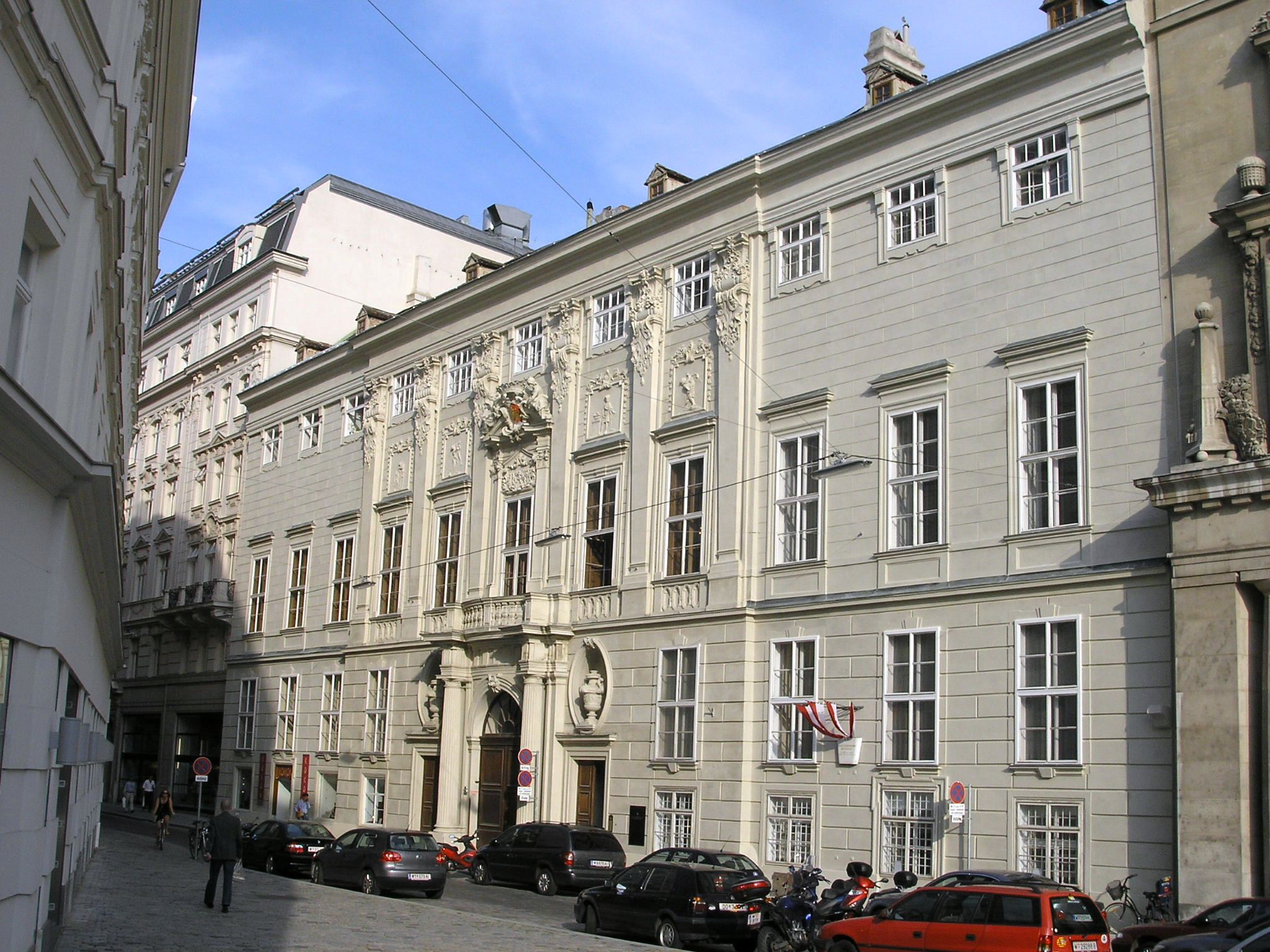
Palais Schönborn-Batthyány in Vienna

Palais Schönborn-Batthyány is a Baroque palace in the Innere Stadt district of Vienna, Austria.

== History ==
It was built by Johann Bernhard Fischer von Erlach around 1699-1706 for Count Adam II. Batthyány. In 1740, his widow, Eleonore, sold the residence to the noble Schönborn family. Friedrich Karl von Schönborn had the interior redecorated. In 1801 the furniture and art collection of Schönborn's Garden Palace in Vienna-Josefstadt were brought here, among them Rembrandt's The Blinding of Samson. The library consisted of 18,000 volumes. In the early 20th century most of the art collection was sold. During the Second World War, the building was damaged, however renovated until 1960. It continues to be the Austrian branch of the Schönborn family's Vienna residence, although partially rented out to other occupants.

== Gallery ==
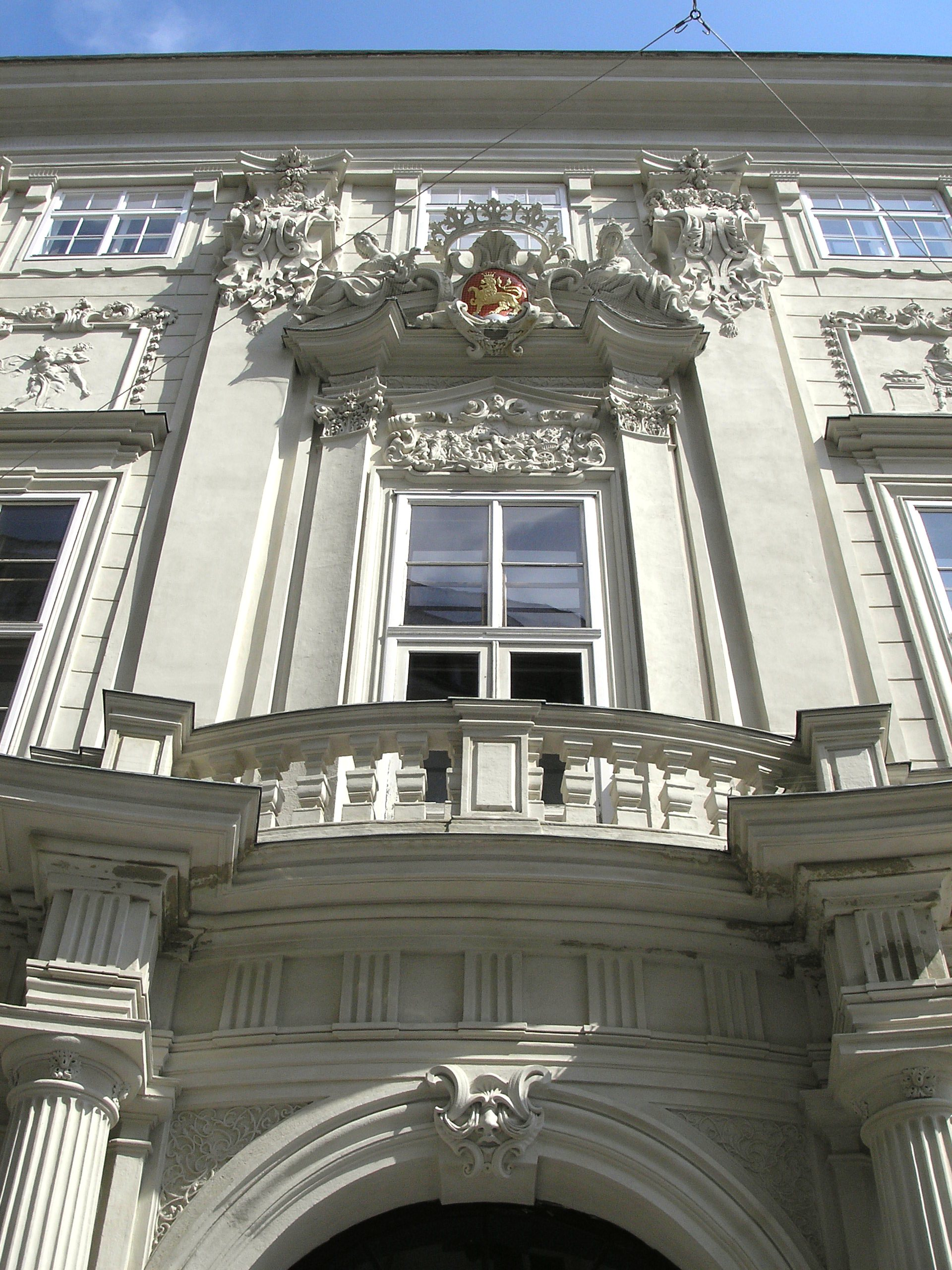
June 2006

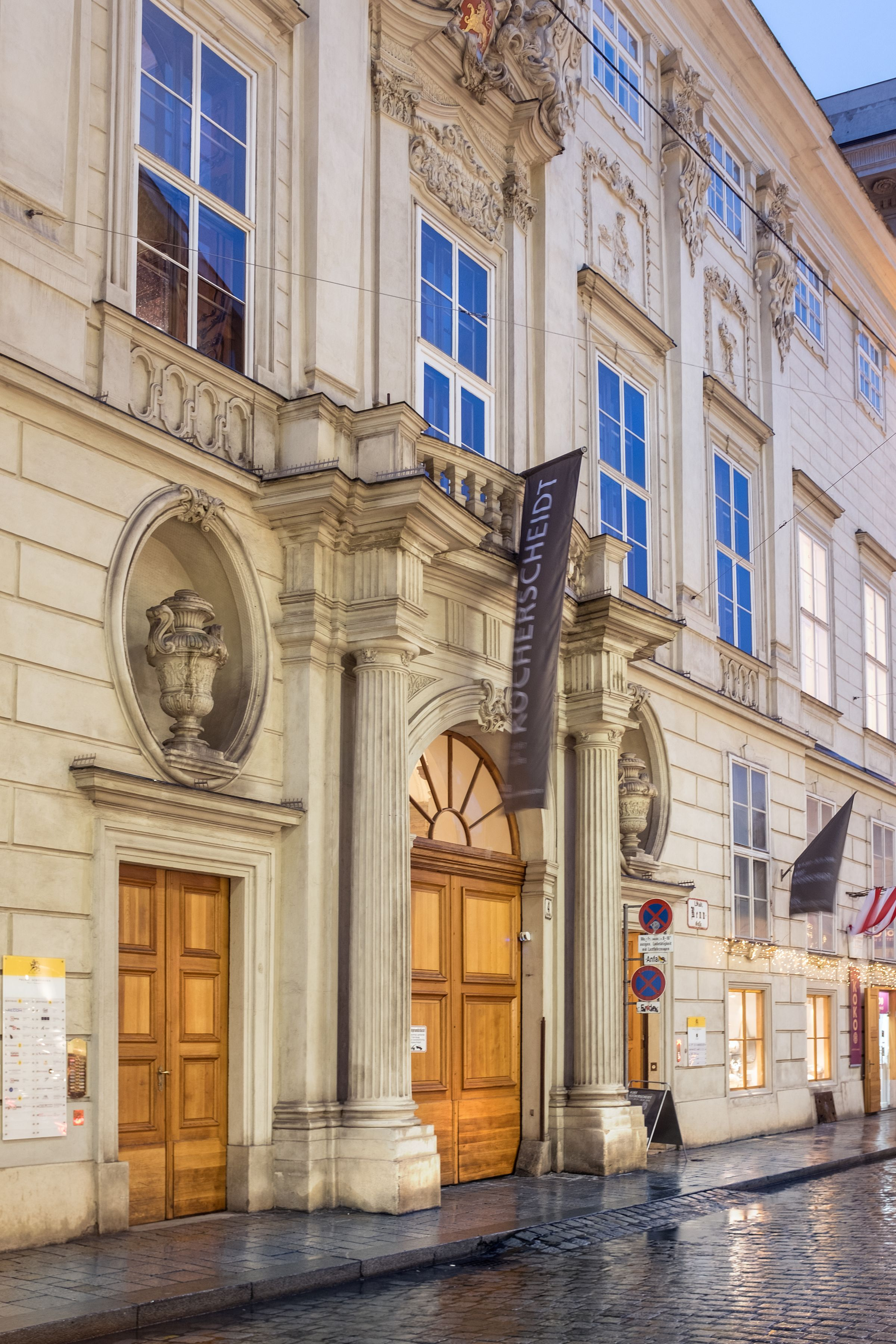
December 2017

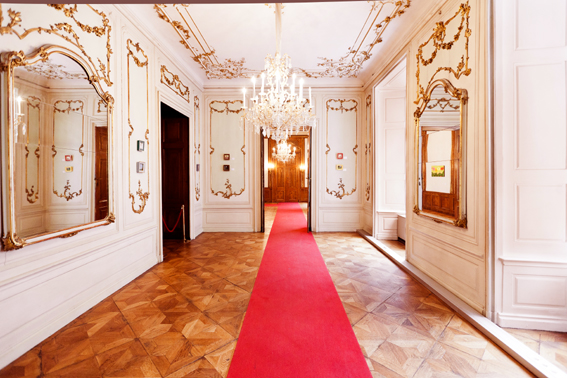
Mint salon

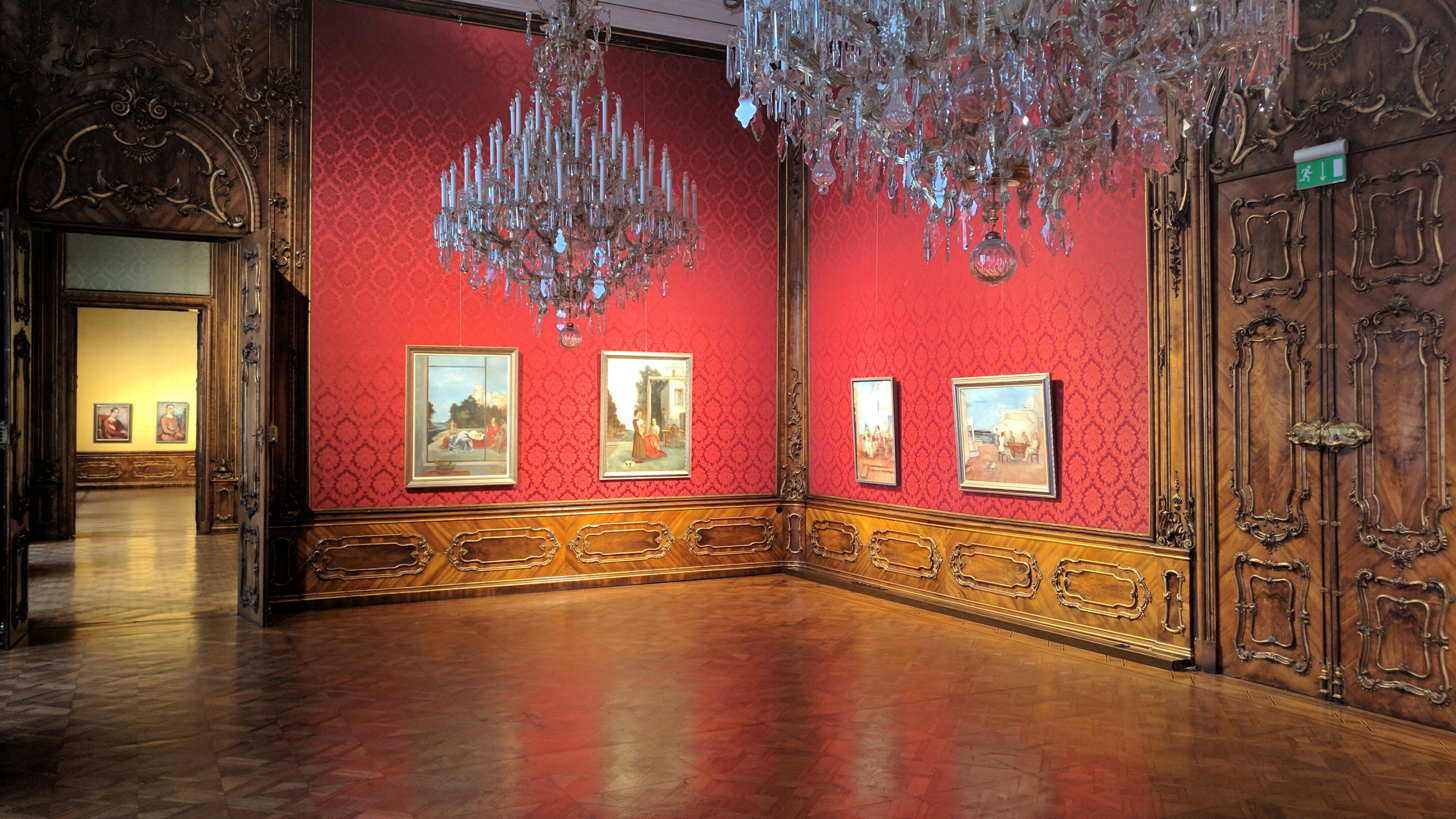
Red salon

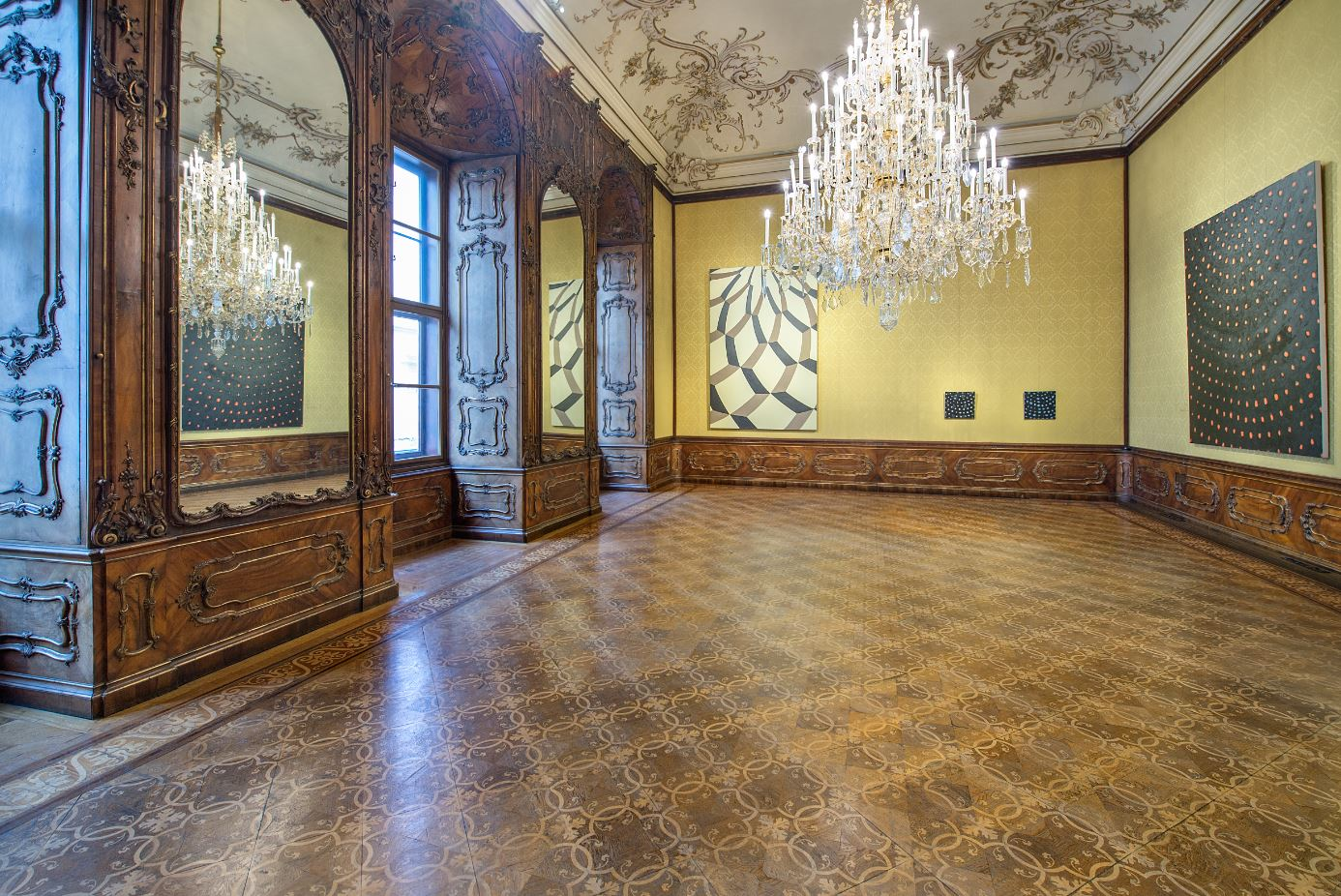
Gallery space

== See also ==
- Batthyány
- Schönborn family
