= Katranide I =

Katranide I Կատրանիդե Ա
- Flag of Bagratuni dynasty

Bagratid Armenia
- Reign: 885–890
- Born: 825
- Died: Mashtots Hayrapet Church (Garni)
- Spouse: Ashot the Great
- Issue: Smbat I
- Religion: Armenian Apostolic Church

Katranide (Armenian: Կատրանիդե Ա, 9th century) was the first queen of the Bagratid Kingdom and a member of the Bagratuni dynasty. She was the wife of the first Bagratuni king – Ashot the Great (885–890). Katranide is known for her khachkar (879), which is situated in Garni, Armenia.

Little is known about her ancestors. Despite that, the names of their children and grandsons are known.

They had four sons and three daughters.

Son/daughter	title	spouse	children
Smbat	king of Armenia (890–914)		Ashot, Abas
Shapuh	constable (sparapet) of Armenian army		Ashot, one more son
Sahak	prince		
David	prince		
Sofya	princess of Vaspurakan	Grigor-Derenik Artsruni	Ashot, Gurgen, Gagik
Mariam	princess of Syunik	Vasak Syuni	Grigor, Sahak, Vasak
daughter	princess	Vahan Artsruni	Gagik

== Family tree ==
Ashot the Great; Ishkhanats ishkhan, sparapet (855–885) king of Armenia (885–890)	Katranide I Queen of Armenia (885–890)
Smbat king of Armenia (890–914)	Sahak	David (†902)	Shapuh sparapet (†912)
Sofya	Grigor-Derenik prince of Vaspurakan (857–887)	daughter	Vahan Artsruni	Mariam (†914)	Vasak Syuni prince of Syunik (855–859)
Ashot prince of Vaspurakan (898–904)	Gagik prince and king of Vaspurakan (904–908, 908–943)	Gurgen prince of Parskahayk (904–925)	Grigor prince of Syunik (859–913)	Sahak	Vasak
Ashot the Iron king of Armenia (914–928)	Sahakanuysh Sevada	Abas king of Armenia (928–953)	Gagik prince of Vaspurakan (897–898)	son	Ashot

== Sources ==
- Cyril Tumanoff, Manuel de Généalogie et de Chronologie pour l'Histoire de la Caucasie Chrétienne (Arménie-Géorgie-Albanie)
- Armenian Soviet Encyclopedia
- René Grousset, Histoire de l'Arménie
- Continuité des élites à Byzance durant les siècles obscurs
