= Mashtots Hayrapet Church of Garni =

Church in Garni, Kotayk, Armenia

Mashtots Hayrapet Church Մաշտոց Հայրապետ եկեղեցի
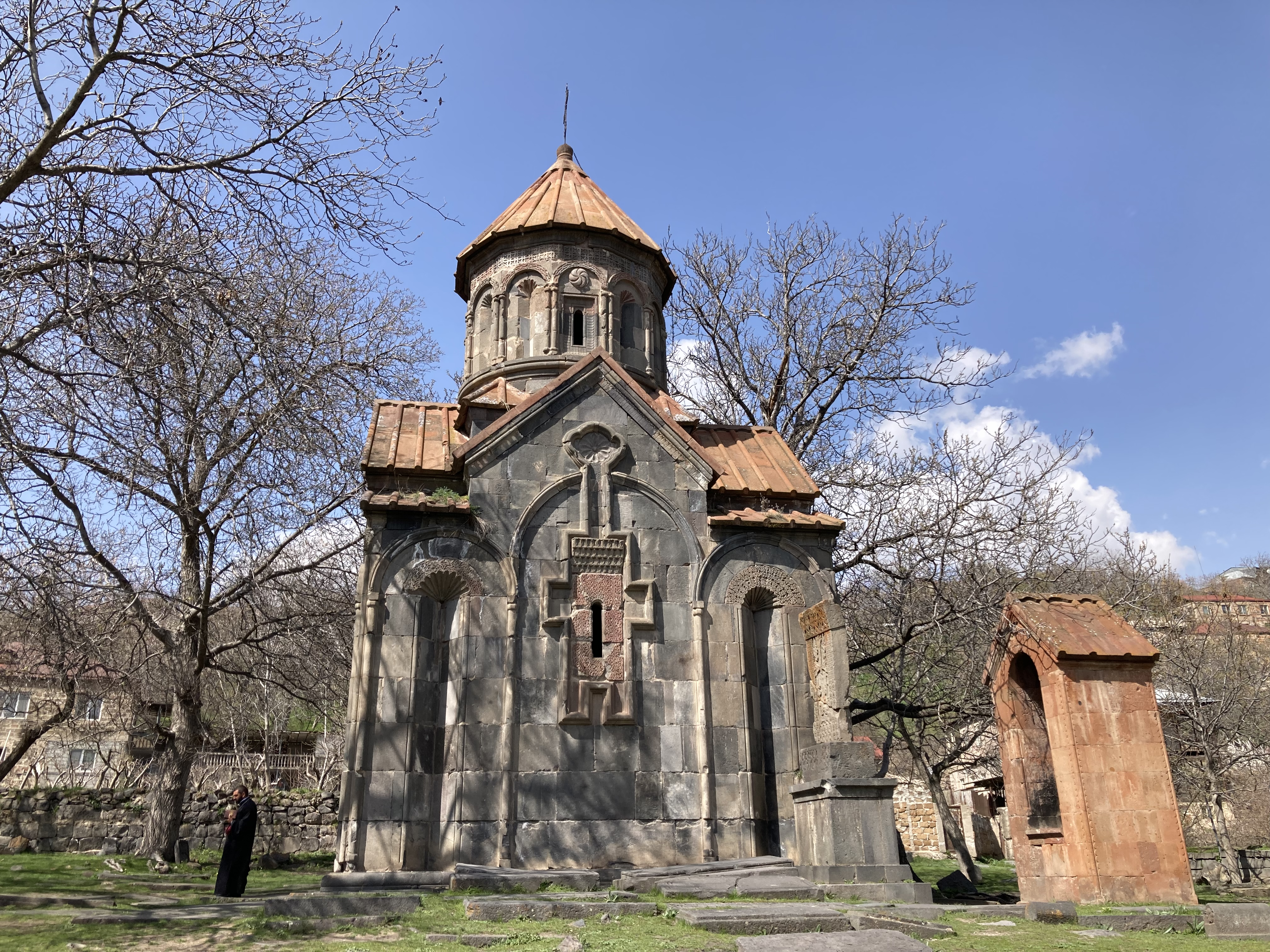
- Mashtots Hayrapet Church, April 2024.

- Location within Armenia

Religion
- Affiliation: Armenian Apostolic Church
- Status: Active

Location
- Location: Garni, Kotayk Province, Armenia
- Coordinates: 40.119233°N 44.737675°E

Architecture
- Type: Small cruciform central-plan
- Style: Armenian
- Completed: 12th century

Specifications
- Direction of façade: Southwest
- Dome: 1

Mashtots Hayrapet (Armenian: Մաշտոց Հայրապետ եկեղեցի; also Pok'r meaning "Little") is a church located within the village of Garni in the Kotayk Province of Armenia. It was built in the 12th century at the site of what was formerly a pagan shrine. A stone carved from red tufa is situated at the right of the entrance to the grounds upon a low rock wall. Upon it is the design of a bird perched on a floral stem with the rosette of eternity under its tail; the latter being a distinctive pagan symbol representing the sun or the moon, symbolizing the eternal cycle of life, death, and rebirth. It is said that because of this pagan symbology, this stone has a connection to the prior shrine.

The church has a small cruciform type central-plan with a single drum and dome. It is constructed from dark grey stone, with red tufa inlaid around the windows, roof, and dome. Elaborate decorations of geometric and foliage patterns may be seen all around the windows, portal, dome, and other parts of the building's façade. The apron around the apse in the interior of the church also is intricately carved. A number of khachkars are scattered around the church grounds, including one in particular adjacent to the building that is reminiscent of a small shrine.

In the village can be found the fortress complex of Garni with the 1st century AD Garni Temple, Surb Astvatsatsin Church, a ruined 4th century single-aisle church, a ruined Tukh Manuk Shrine, Saint Sargis Shrine, and a Queen Katranide Shrine. Across the Garni Gorge are the ruins of Havuts Tar Monastery and Aghjots Vank located in the Khosrov State Reserve.

== Gallery ==
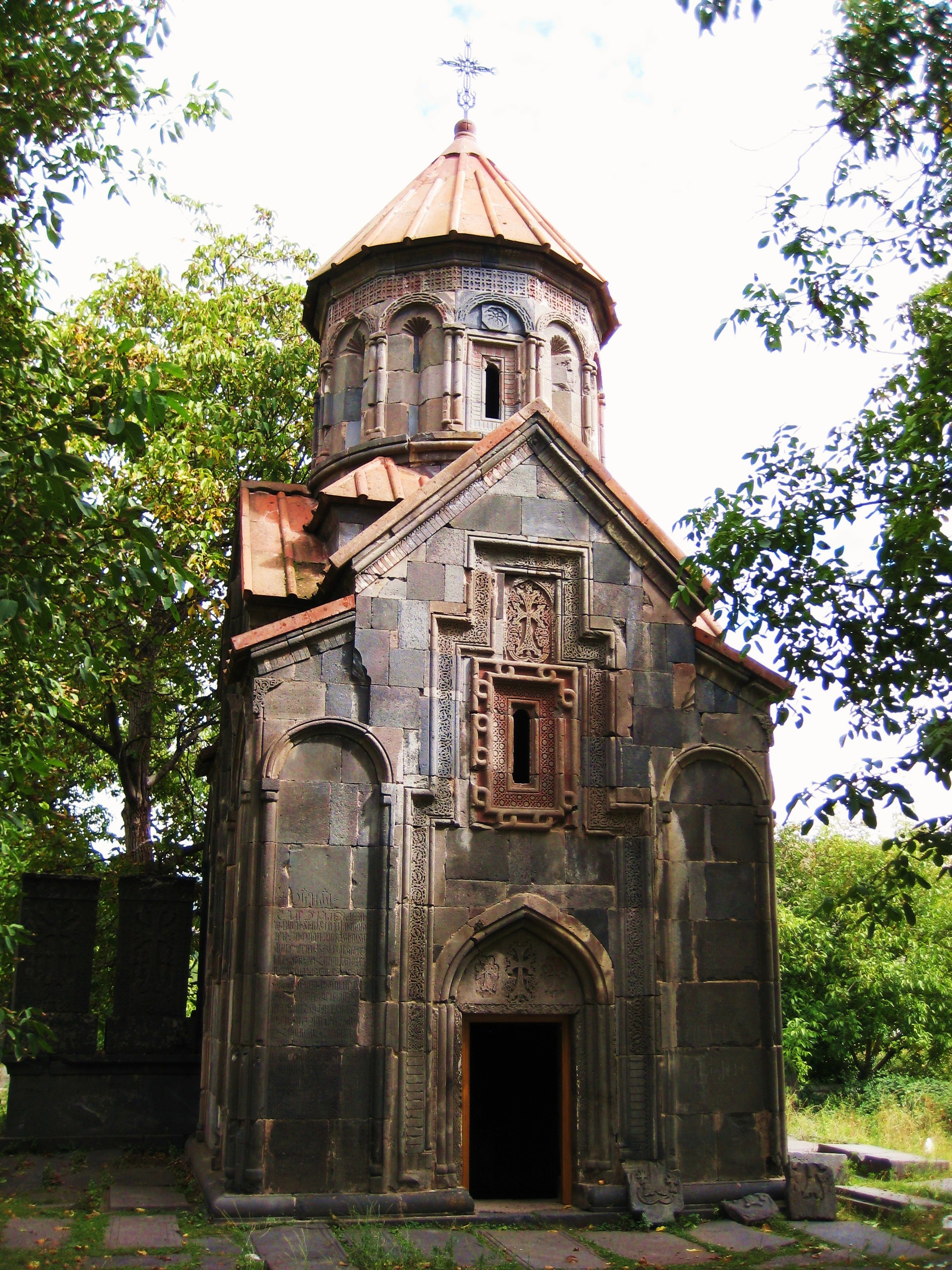
Front façade of Mashtots Hayrapet Church.

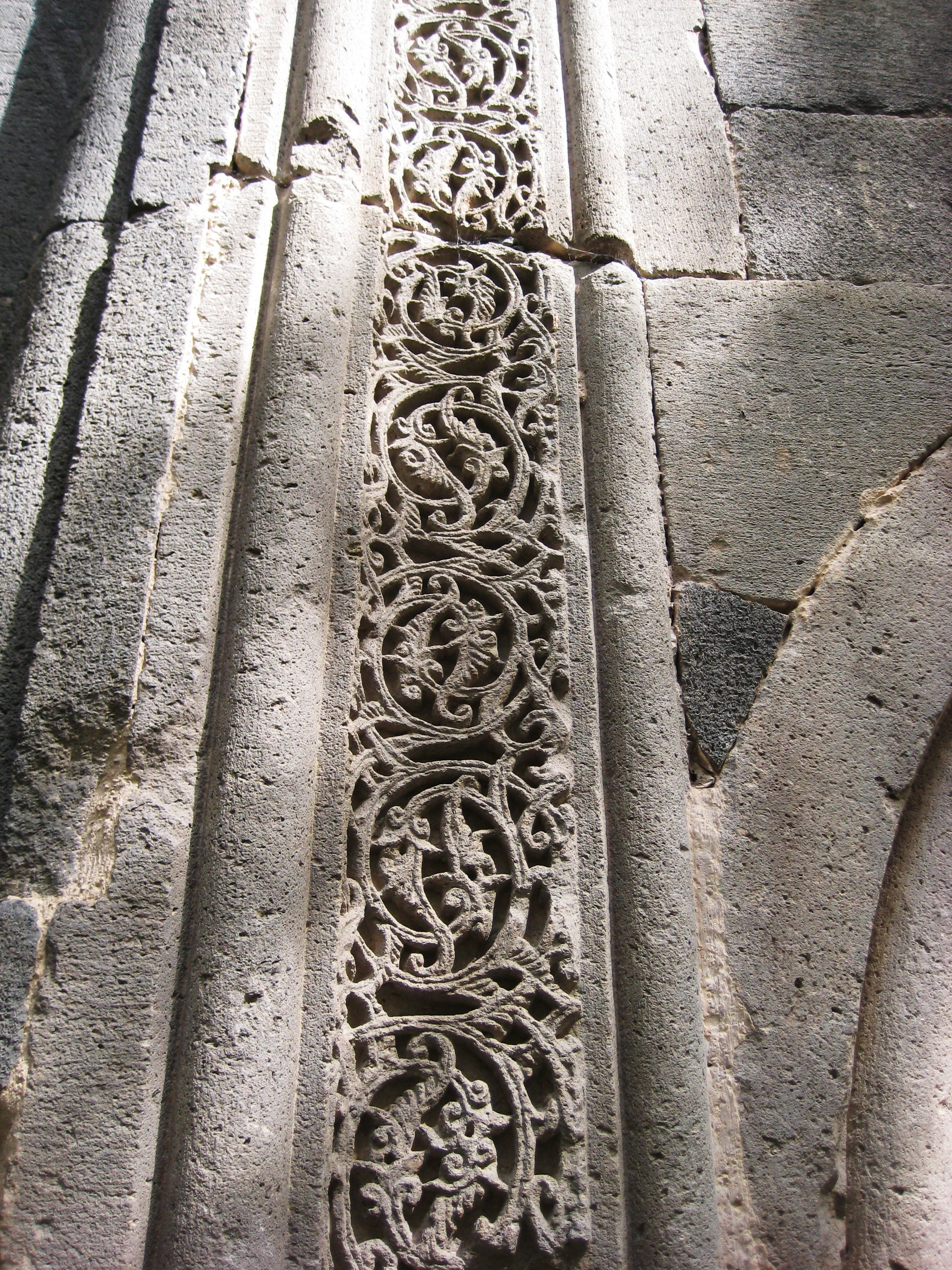
Façade detail around portal.

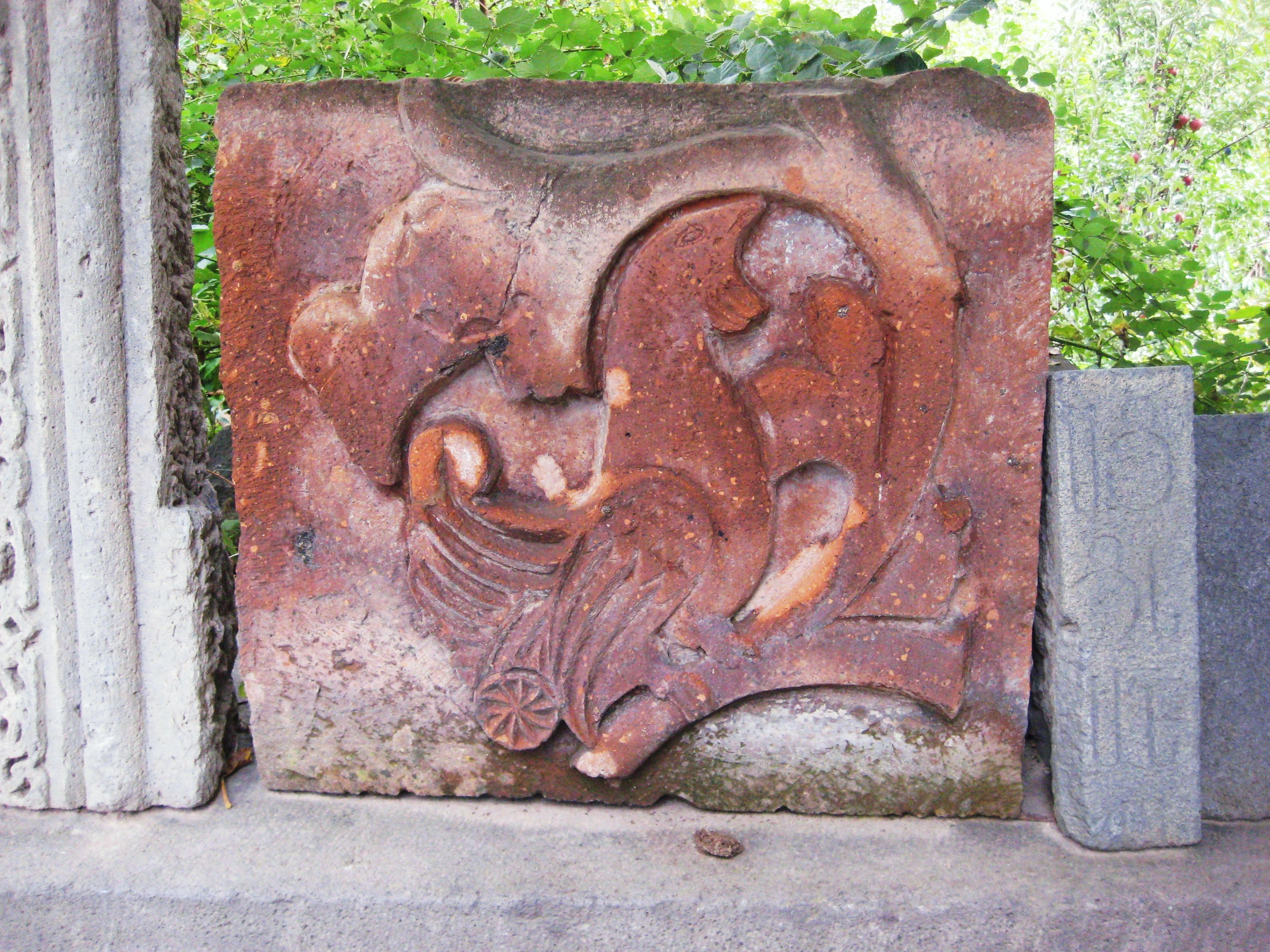
Bird perched upon a floral stem with the pagan symbol of the "rosette of eternity" under its tail.

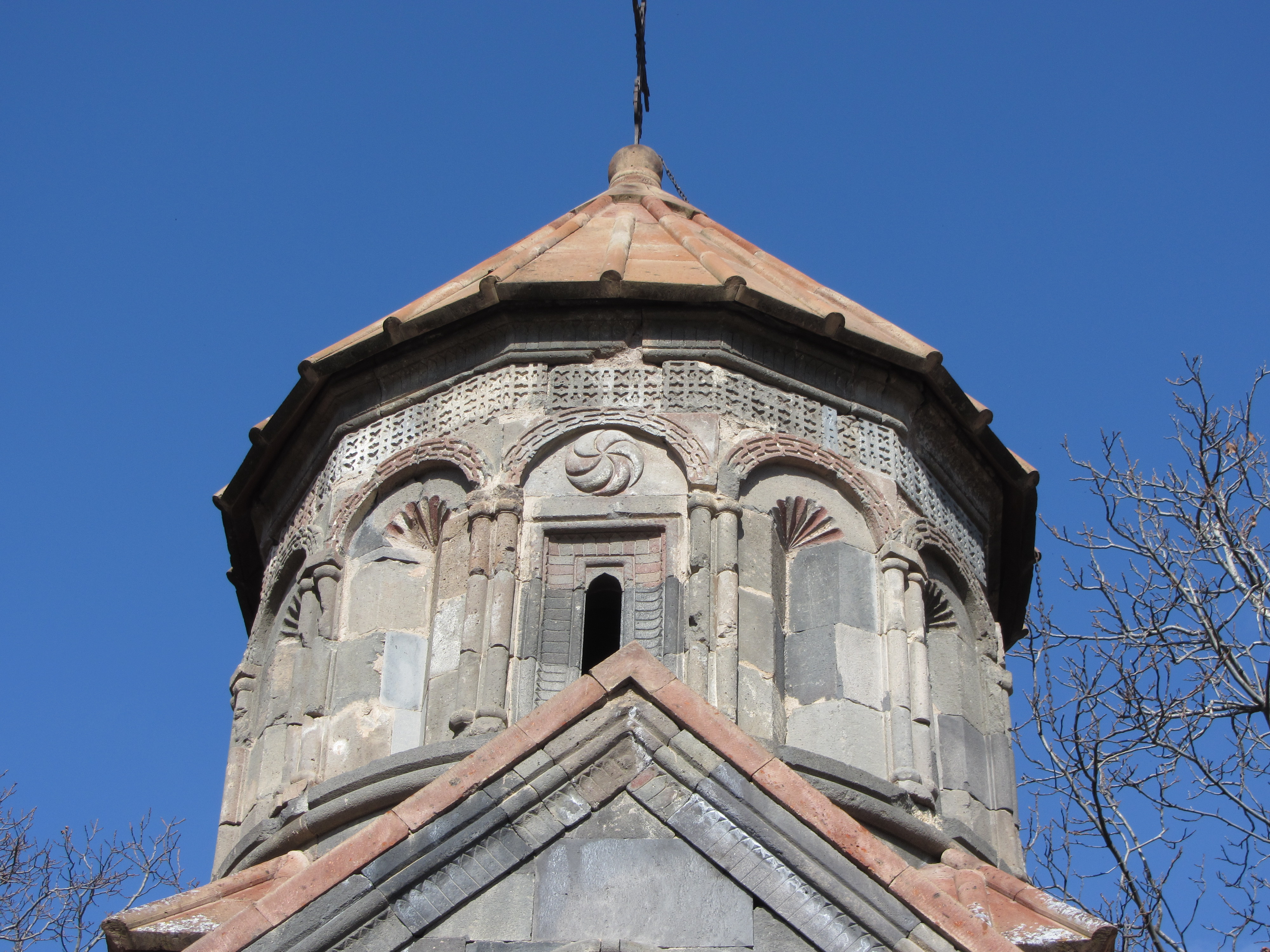
Surb Mashtots Hayrapet (Sb Astvatsatsin) Church, dome

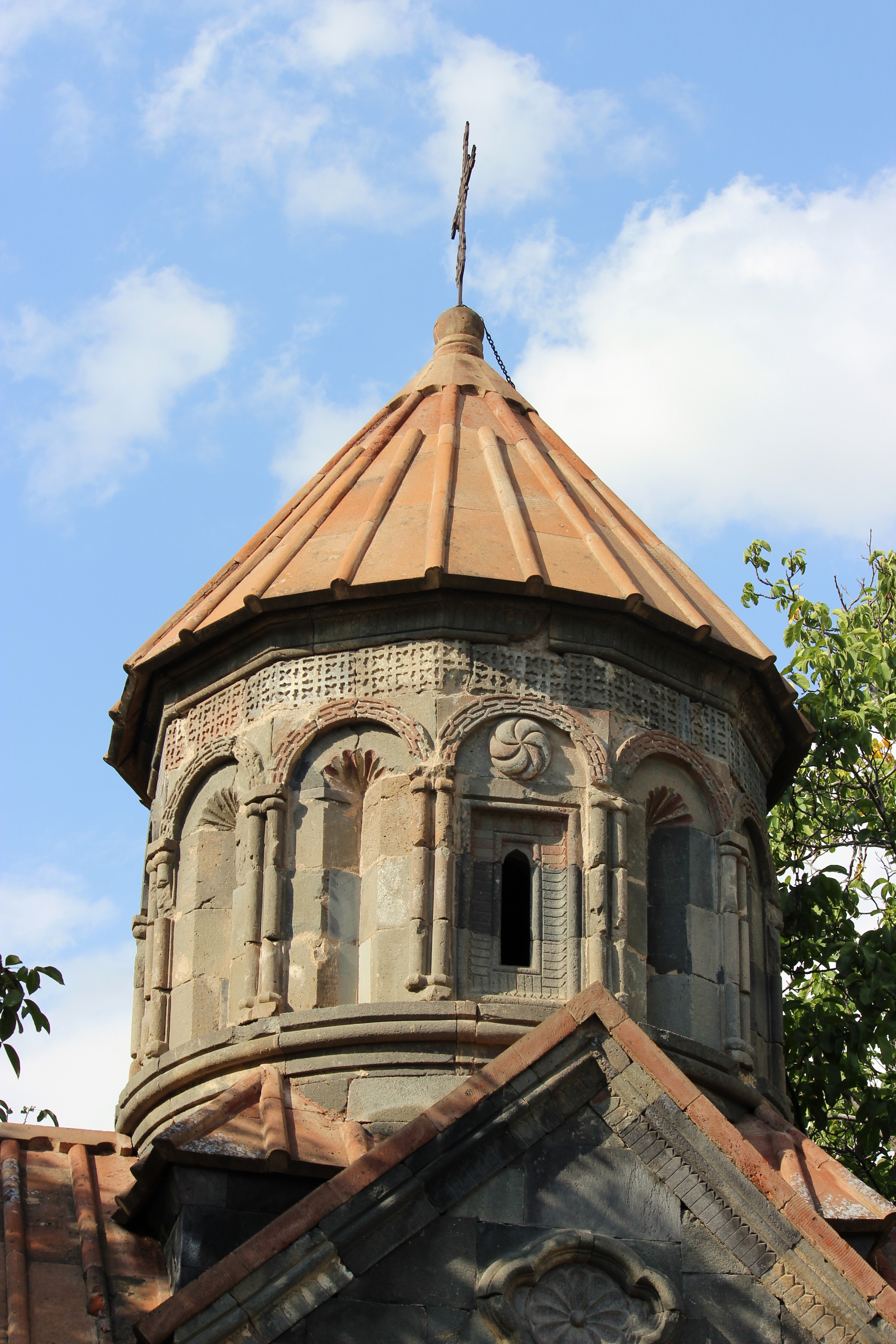
Mashtots Hayrapet Church drum and dome

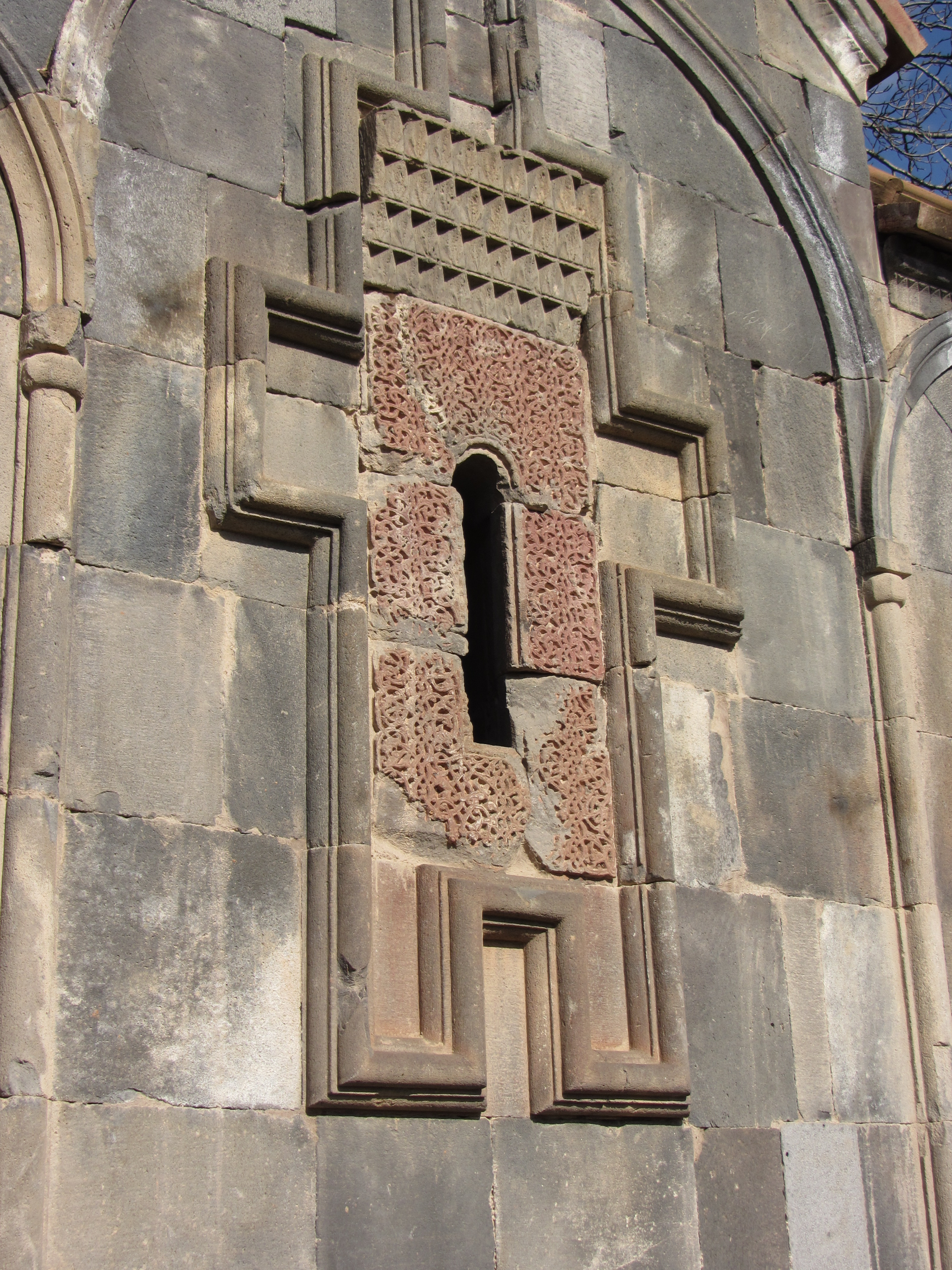
Surb Mashtots Hayrapet Church, wall oprnament

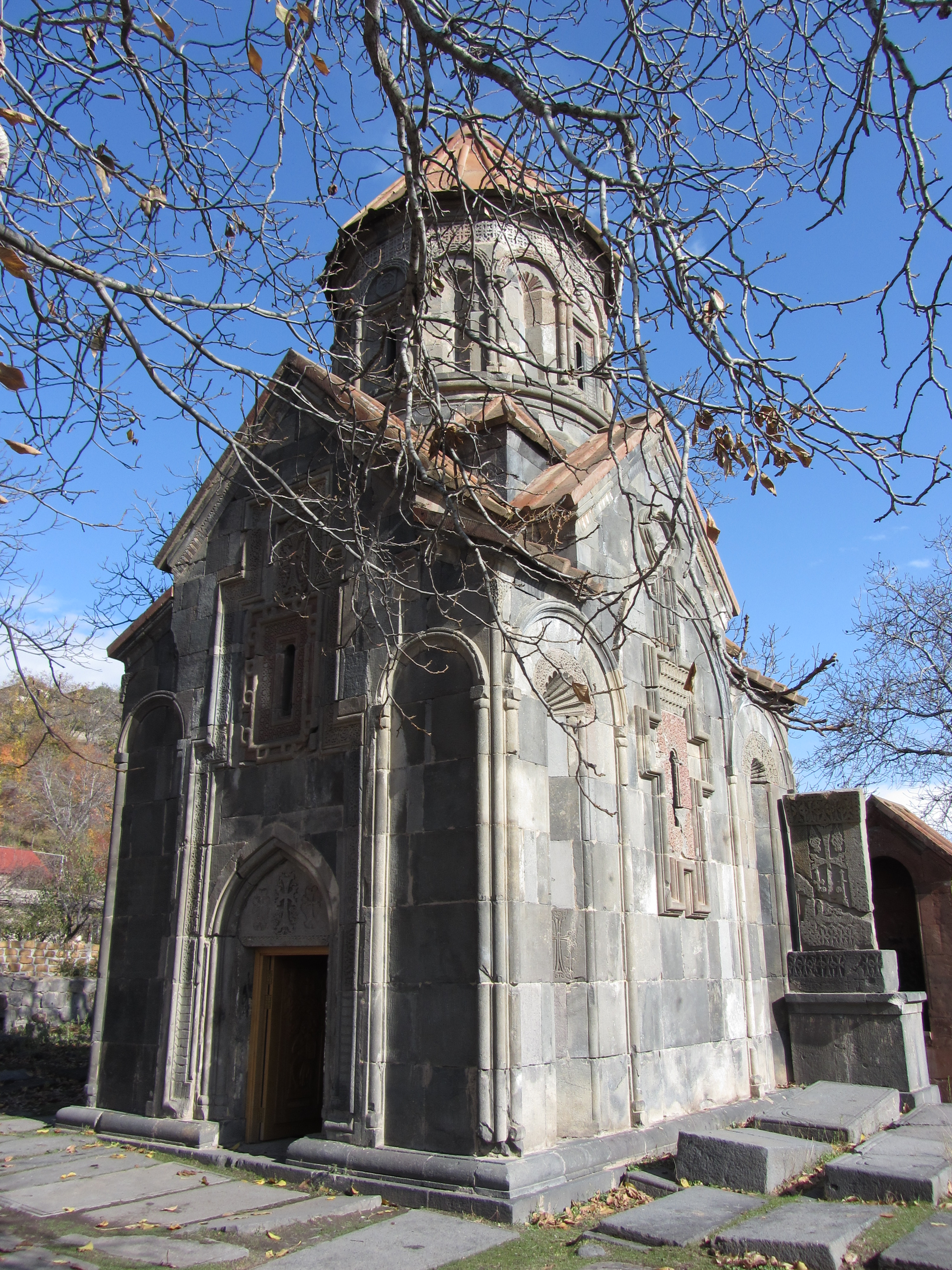
Surb Mashtots Hayrapet Church

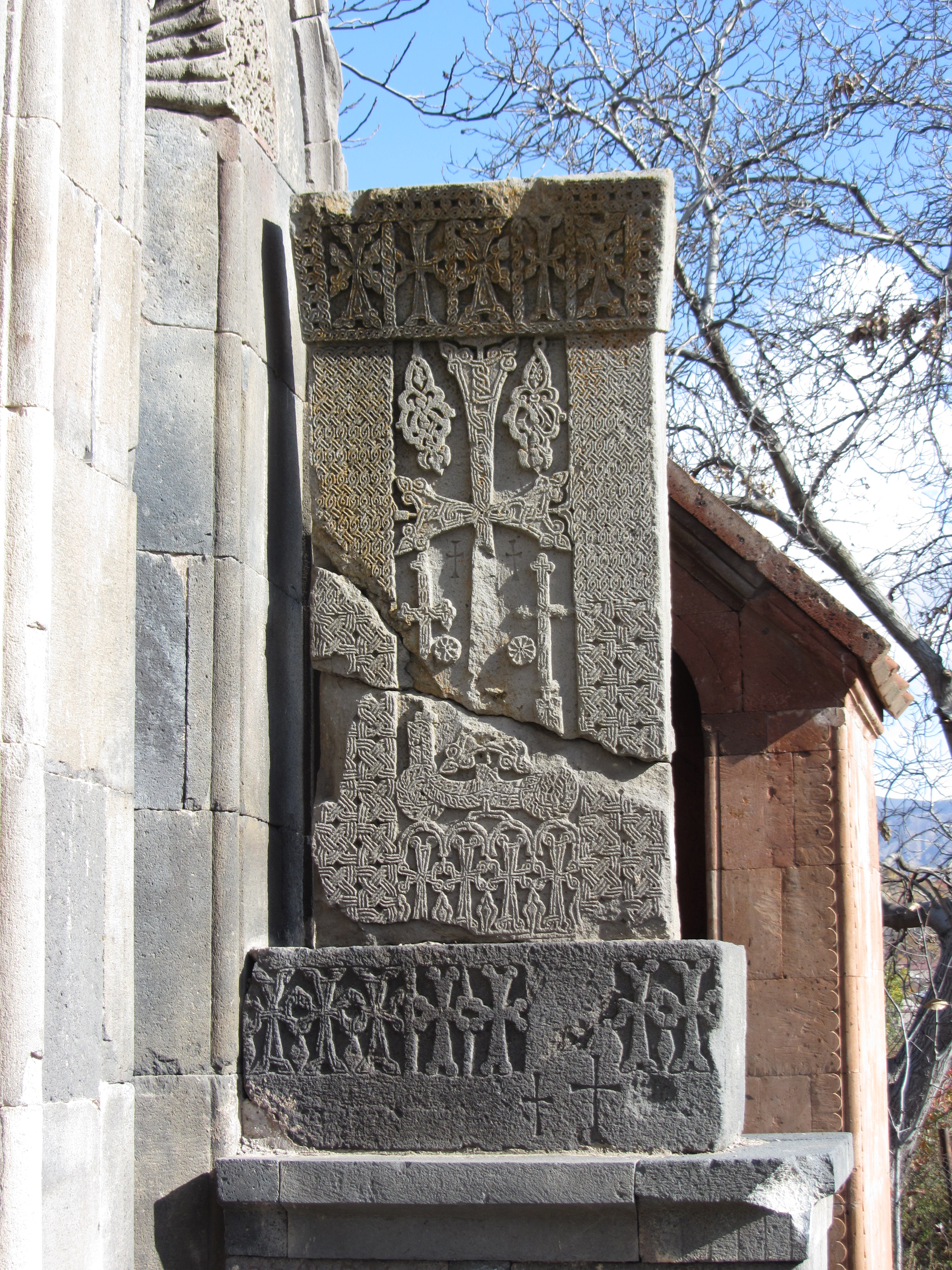
Surb Mashtots Hayrapet Church, Cross-Stone

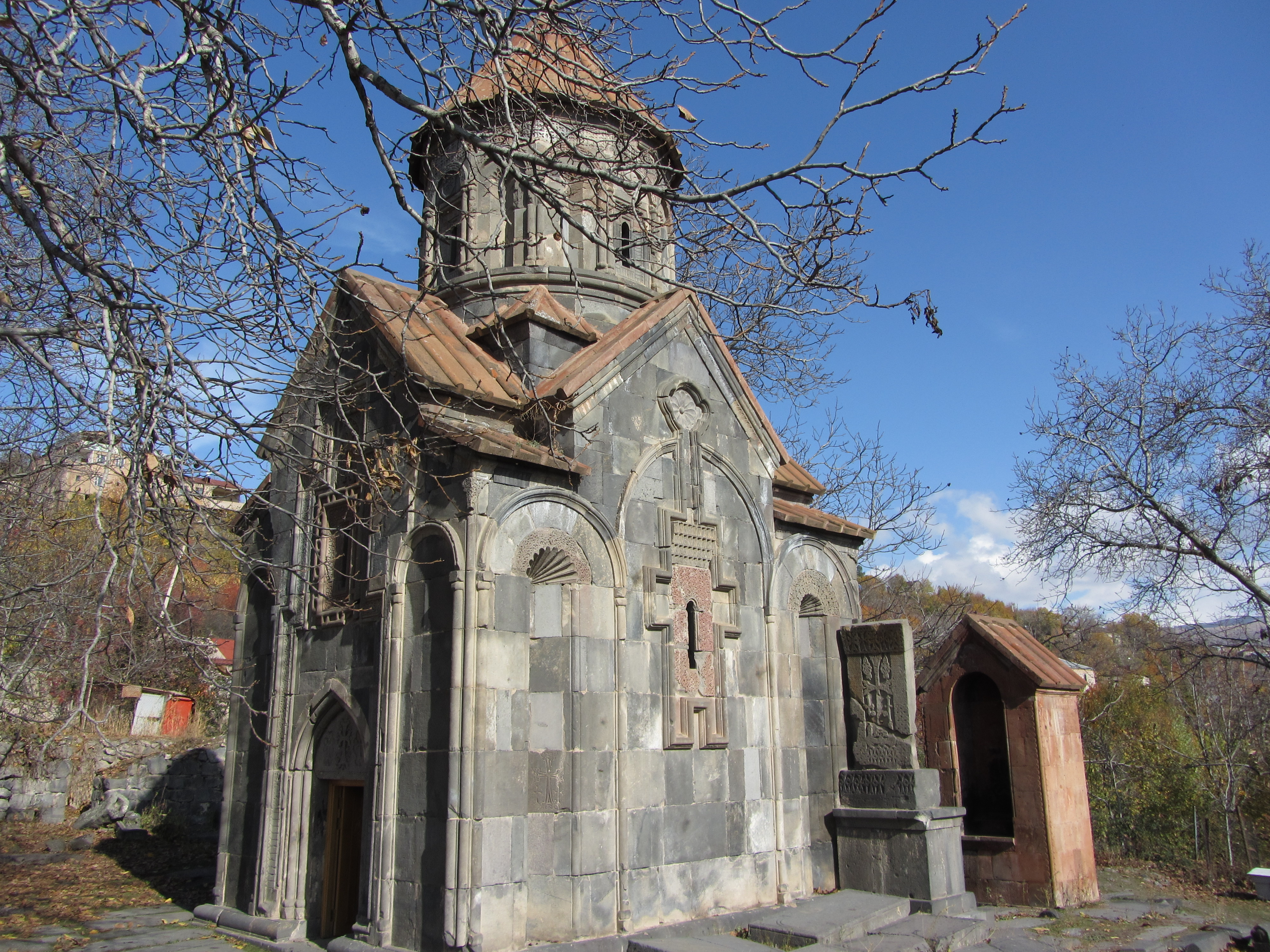
Surb Mashtots Hayrapet Church

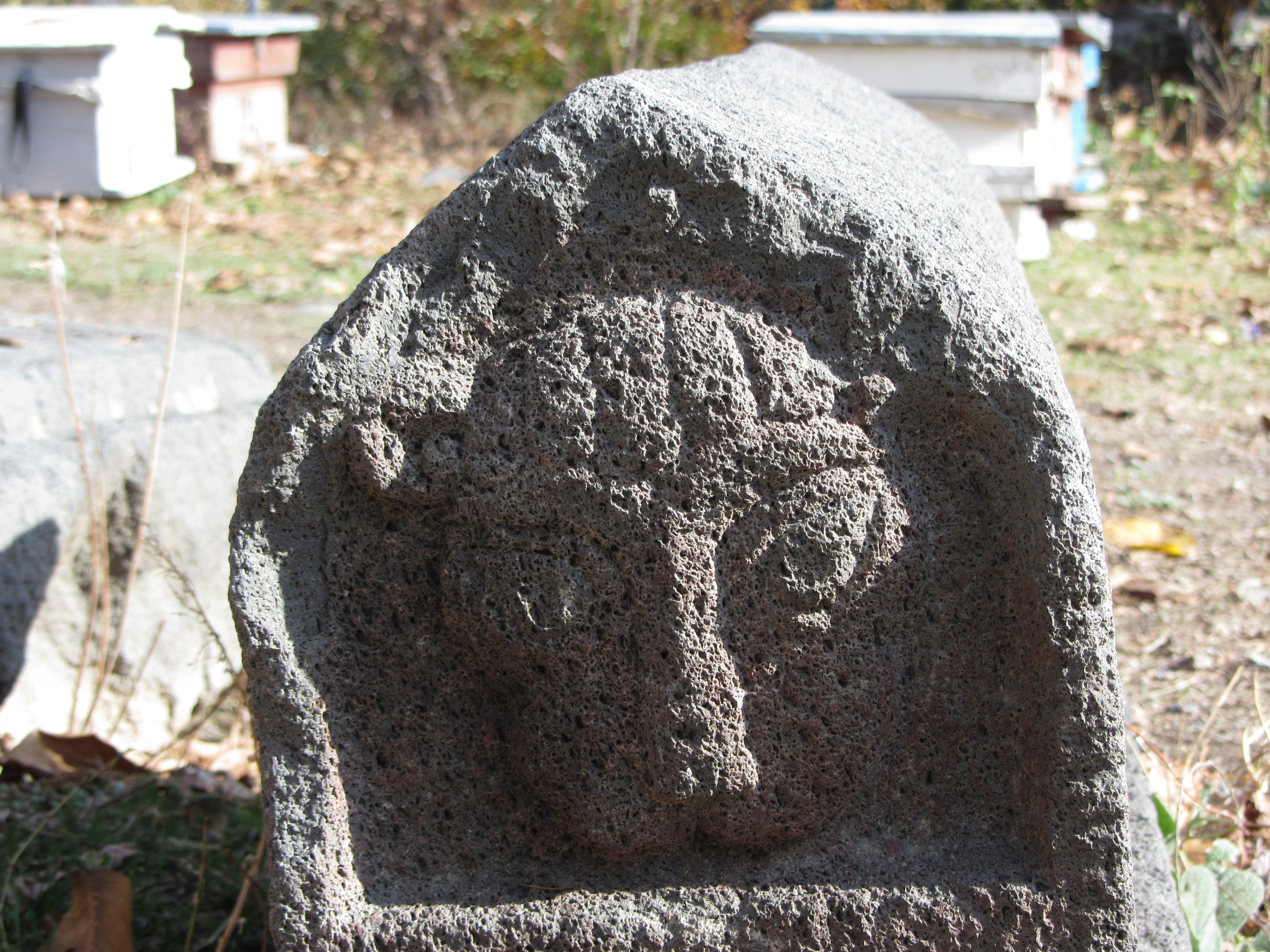
Surb Mashtots Hayrapet Church, gravestone

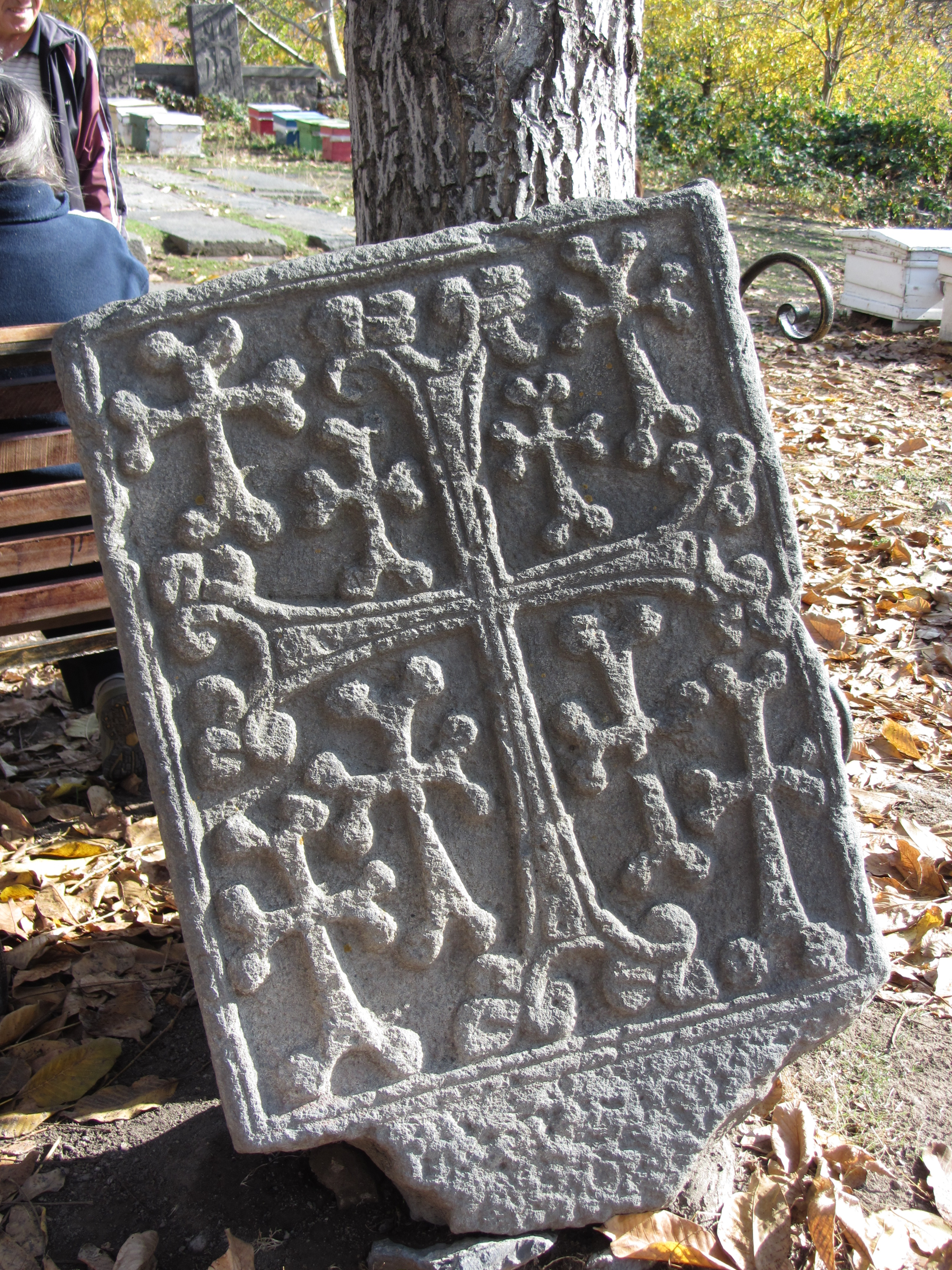
Surb Mashtots Hayrapet Church, Cross-stone

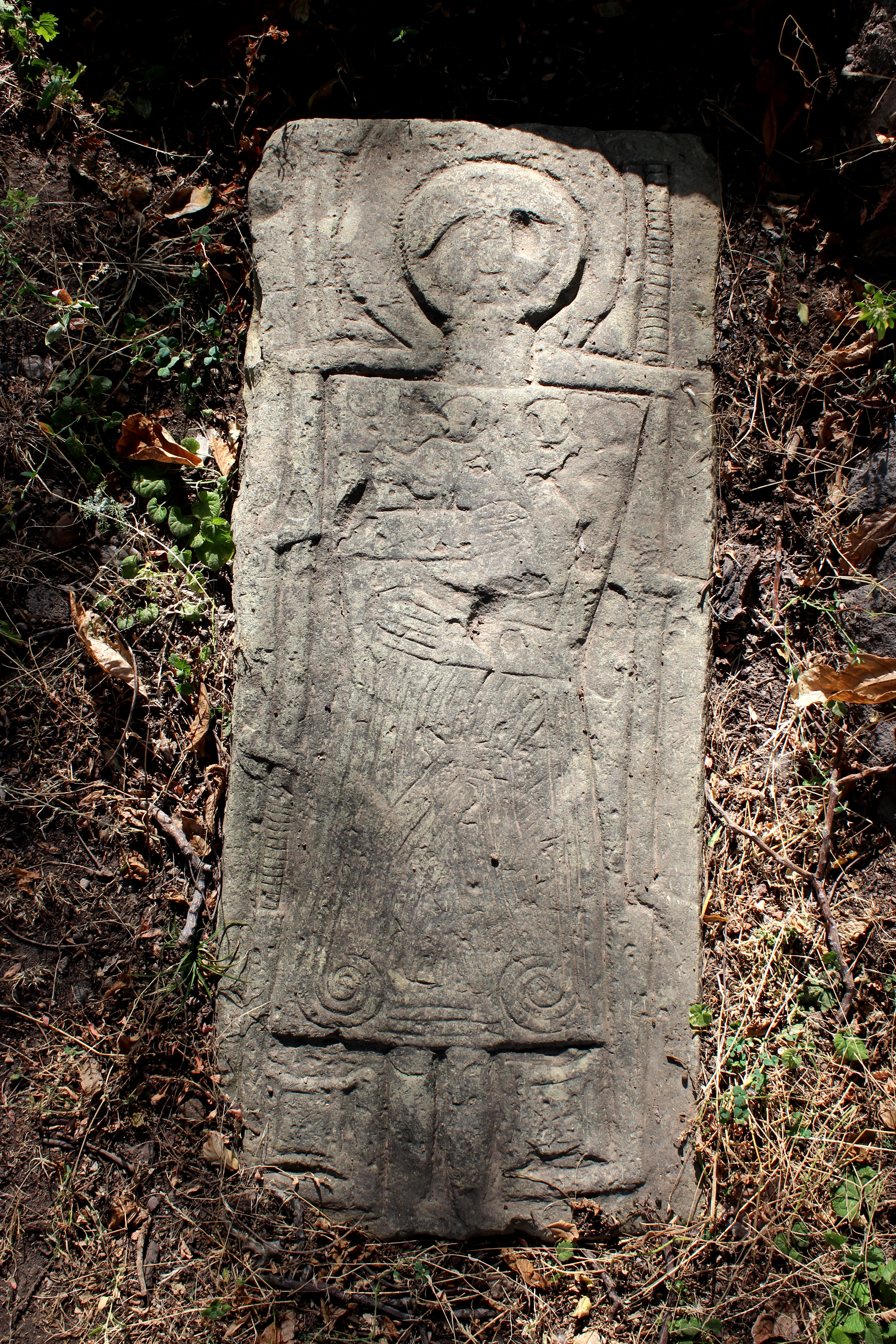
Tombstone with individual holding a duck
