= Garni =

Village in Kotayk, Armenia

Garni Գառնի
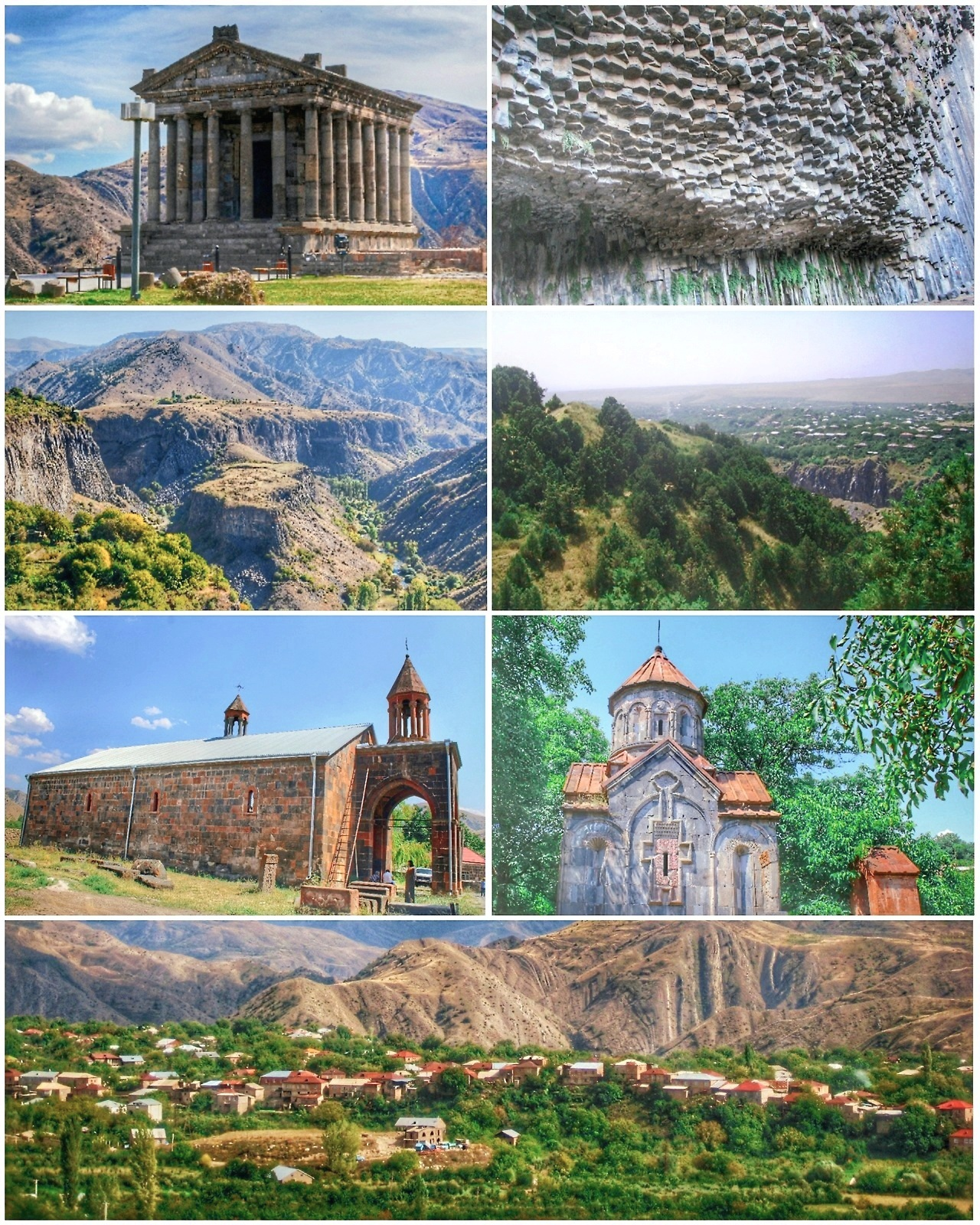
- Landmarks of Garni, from top left: Garni Temple • Symphony of Stones; Garni Gorge • Khosrov Forest Reserve; Surb Astvatsatsin Church • Mashtots Hayrapet; General view of Garni

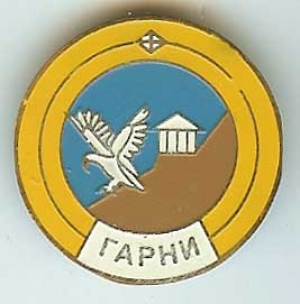
- Coat of arms

- Location within Armenia
- Coordinates: 40°07′10″N 44°43′23″E
- Country: Armenia
- Marz: Kotayk

Government
  - Mayor: Aharon Sahakyan

Area
  - Total: 33.42 km^{2} (12.90 sq mi)
- Elevation: 1,400 m (4,600 ft)

Population (2011 census)
  - Total: 6,910
  - Density: 207/km^{2} (536/sq mi)
- Time zone: GMT +4

Garni (Armenian: Գառնի) is a major village in the Kotayk Province of Armenia. It is known for the nearby classical temple. As of the 2011 census, the population of the village is 6,910.

== History ==
The settlement is best known for the Hellenistic Garni temple. The area was first occupied in the 3rd millennium BC along easily defensible terrain at one of the bends of the Azat River.

In the 8th century BC the area was conquered by the Urartian King Argishti I. Gevorg Jahukyan proposed an etymology from Urartian word garini meaning "fortress". The fortification at Garni was erected probably some time in the 3rd century BC as a summer residence for the Armenian Orontid and Artaxiad royal dynasties.

Later, around the 1st century AD, the fortress of Garni became the last refuge of King Mithridates of Armenia, and he and his family were assassinated there by his son-in-law and nephew Rhadamistus. The fortress was sacked in 1386 by Timur Lenk. In 1679 an earthquake devastated the area and destroyed the temple.

== Monuments and landmarks ==
Garni is notable for its fortress complex containing the 1st-century AD Garni Temple, Surb Astvatsatsin Church of Garni, Mashtots Hayrapet Church, a ruined 4th-century single-aisle church, a ruined Tukh Manuk Shrine, Saint Sargis Shrine, and a Queen Katranide Shrine.

Nearby is the Garni Gorge with well preserved basalt columns, carved out by the Goght River. This portion of the gorge is often referred to as the "Symphony of the Stones". It is most easily reached via a road that leads left down the gorge just before reaching the temple of Garni. Another road leads to the gorge through the village, down a cobblestone road, and into the valley.

Once in the valley, turning right leads to Garni Gorge with an 11th-century medieval bridge and the "Symphony of the Stones". Turning left leads along the river, past a fish hatchery, up to the Khosrov State Reserve and, a little further, Havuts Tar Monastery (which can be seen from the Garni temple). The medieval bridge was controversially reconstructed in 2013, in a project organized and paid for by the US government through its Ambassadors Fund for Cultural Preservation. Critics said the work destroyed the original bridge and turned it into a new structure without value as an historical monument. Within the Khosrov reserve is Aghjots Vank from the 13th century, the church of Saint Stepanos, and the fortress of Kakavaberd. Garni lies along the road to the UNESCO World Heritage Site of Geghard Monastery (a further 7 km southeast).

== People ==
- Suren Markosyan, is an Armenian Freestyle wrestler.

== Gallery ==
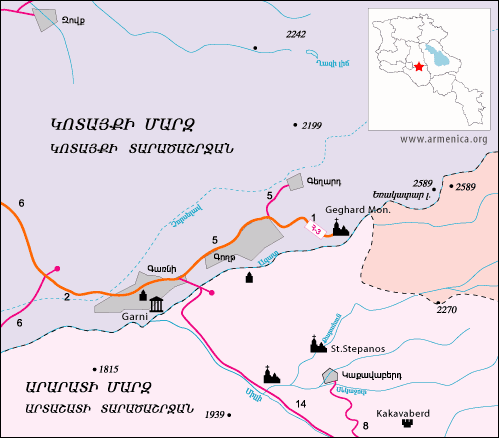
Map of Garni and the surrounding area

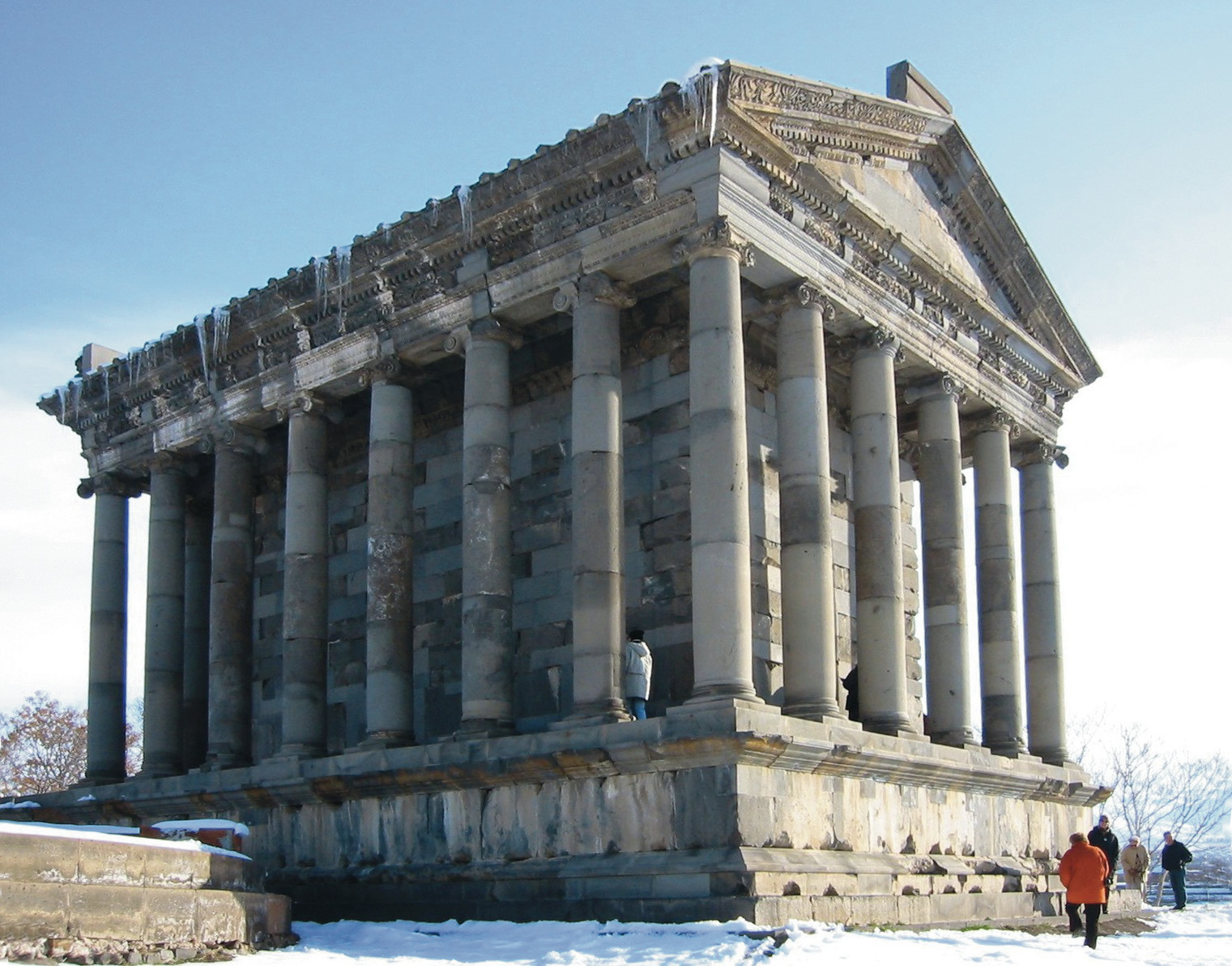
Garni Temple

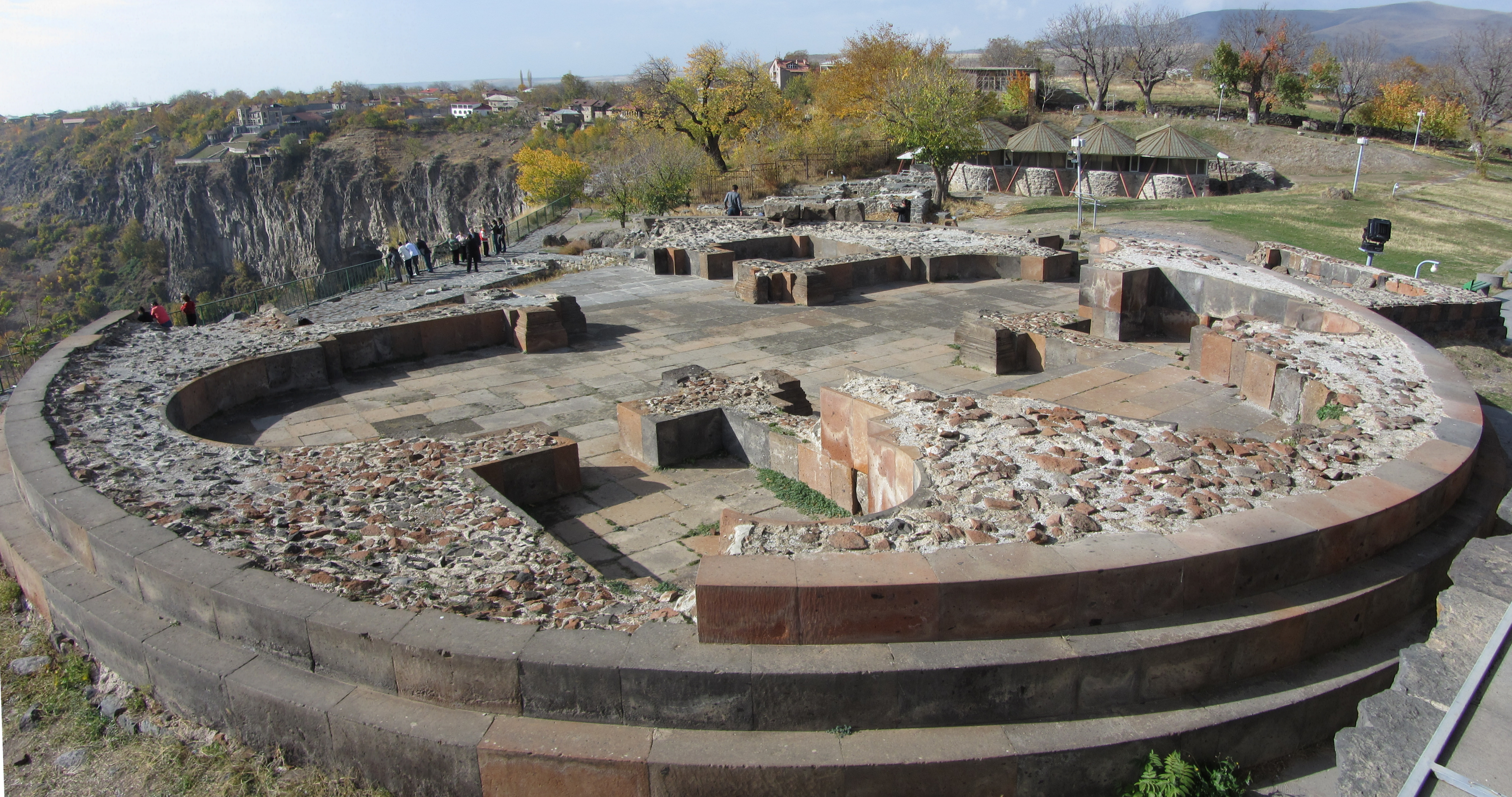
Saint Sion Church foundations adjacent to Garni Temple, 7th to 9th centuries

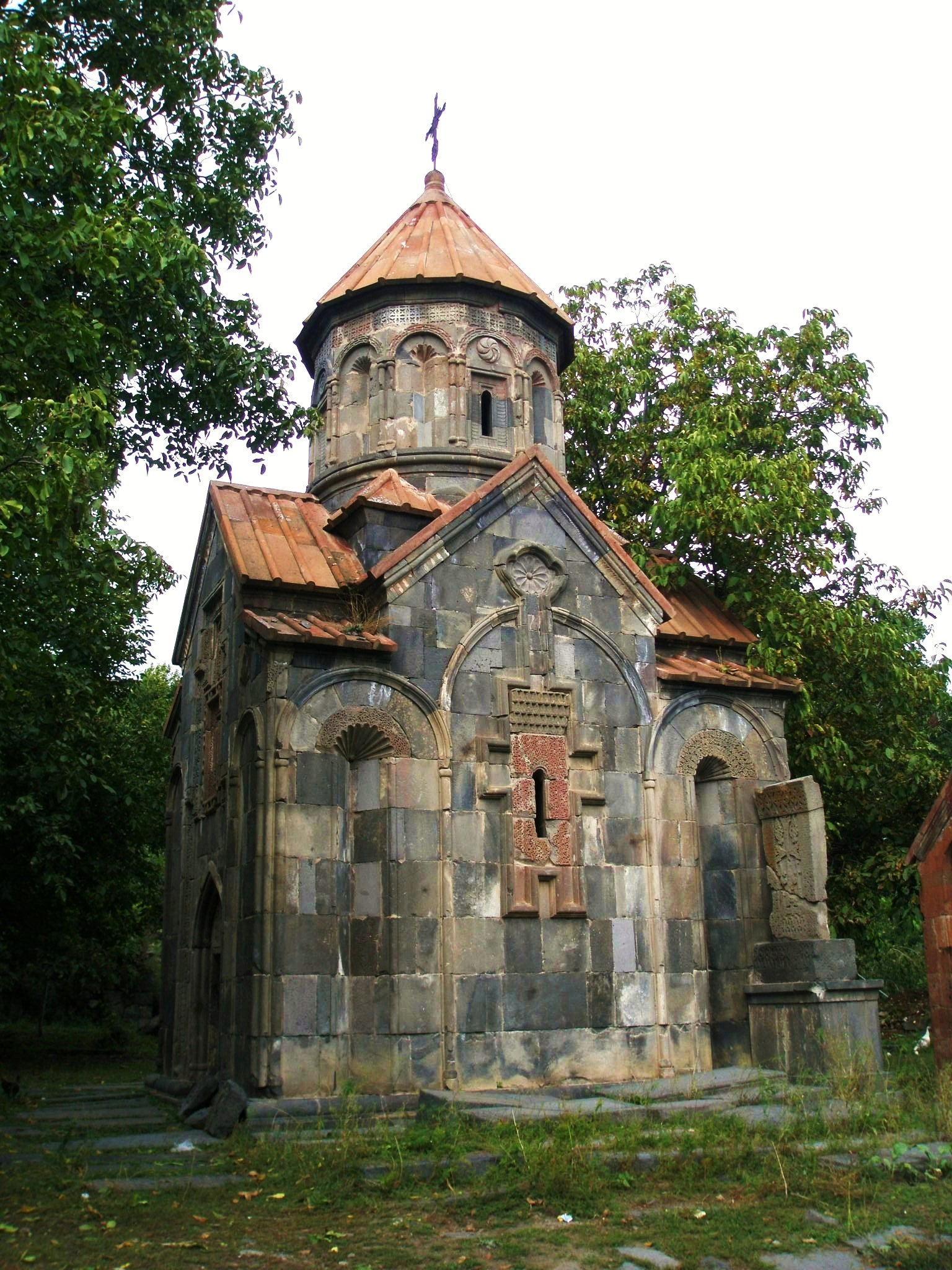
Mashtots Hayrapet Church, 12th century

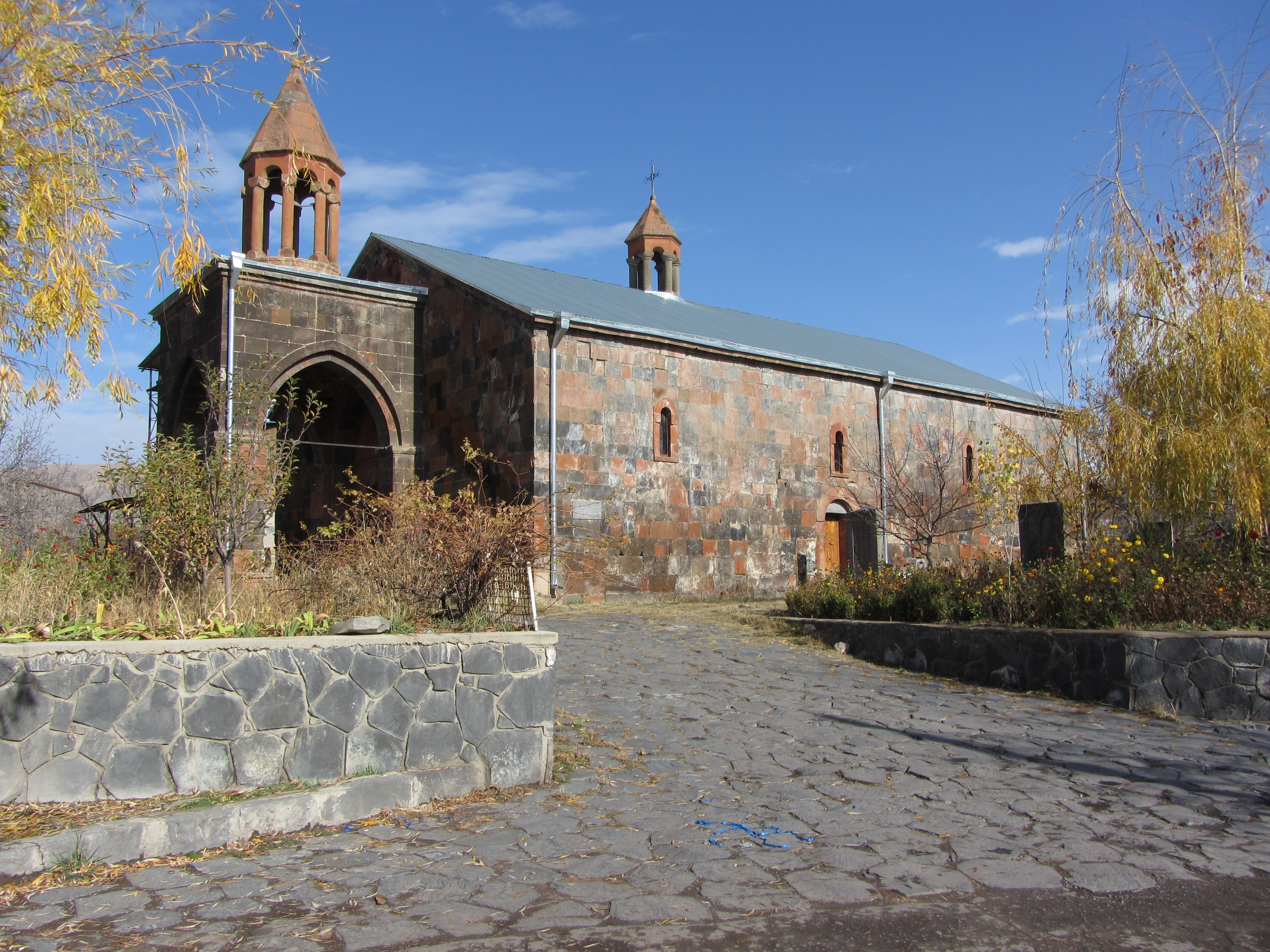
Garni, Surp Astvatsatsin Church, 11th century

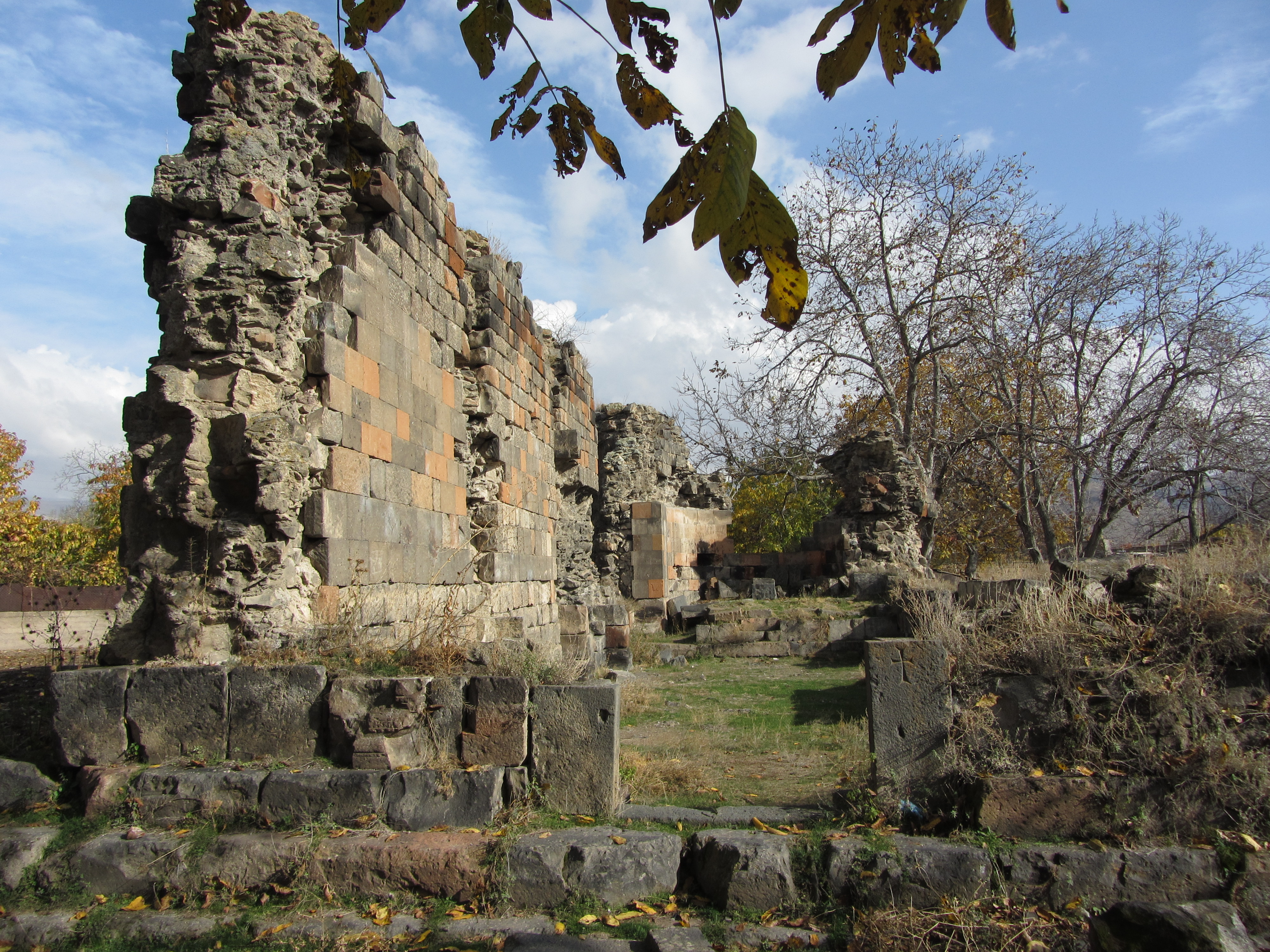
Khumarazham Church ruins, 4th-5th centuries

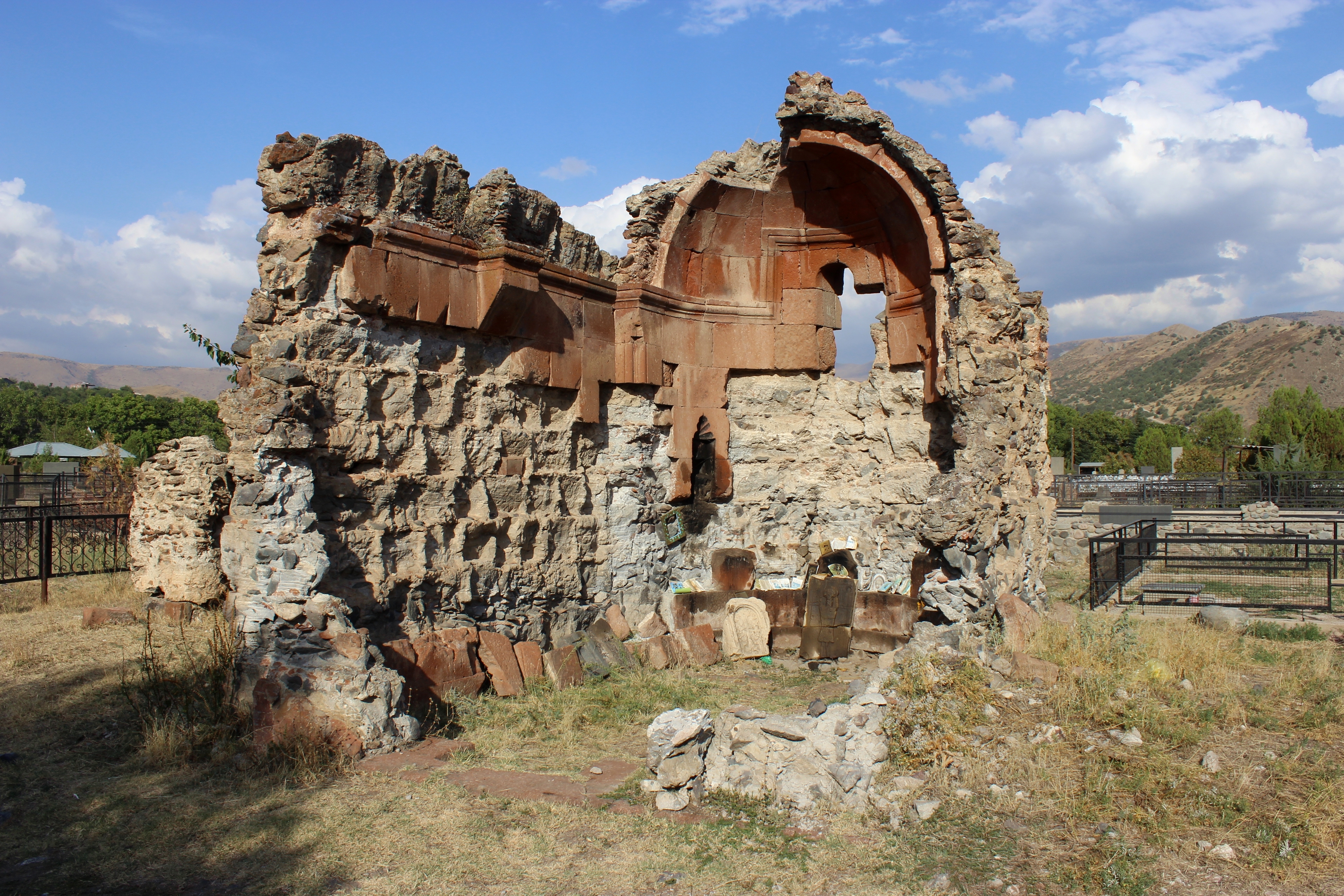
Ruins of a 4th-century single-aisle chapel at the west side of the Garni cemetery

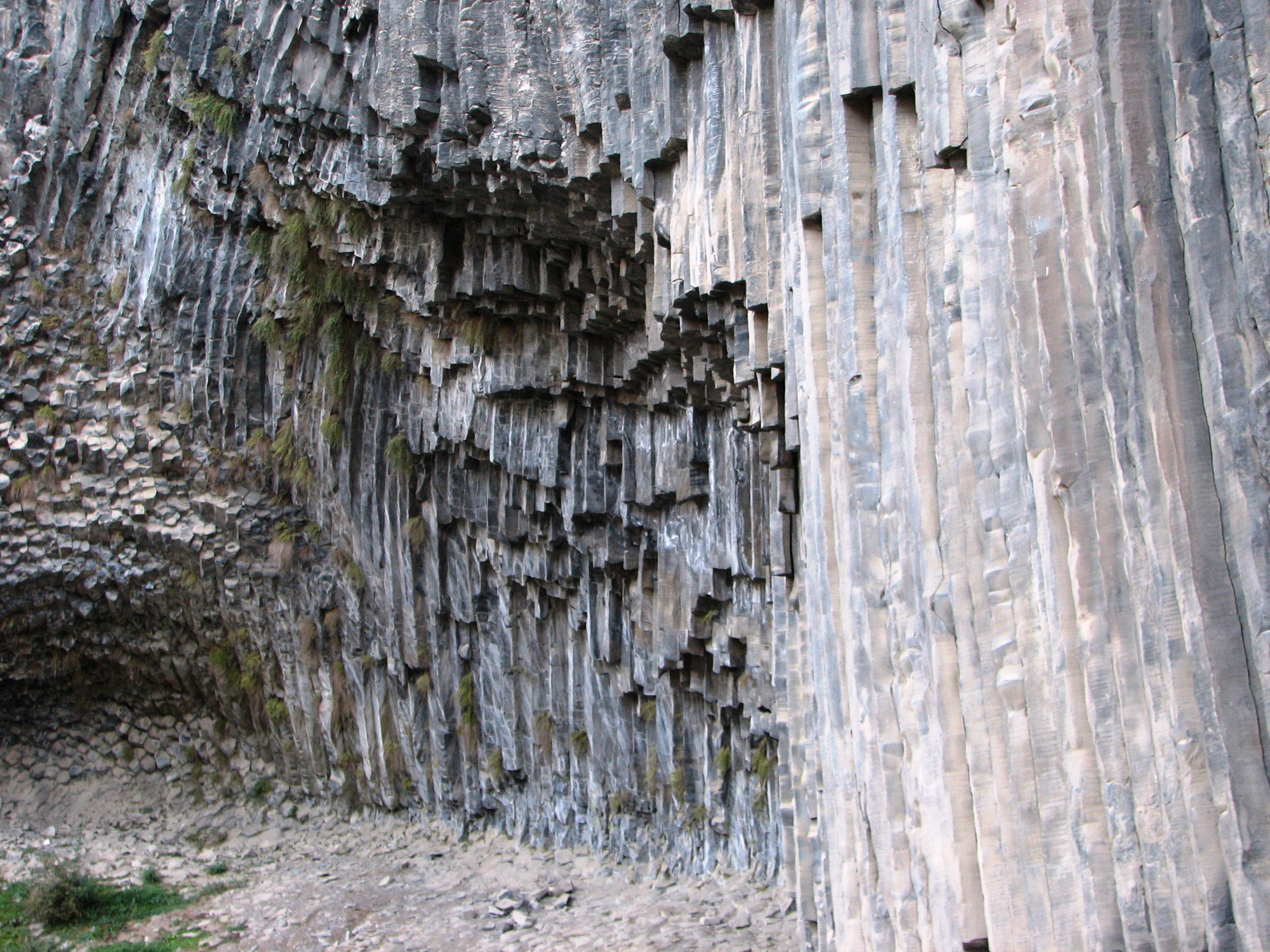
Garni Gorge "Symphony of the Stones"

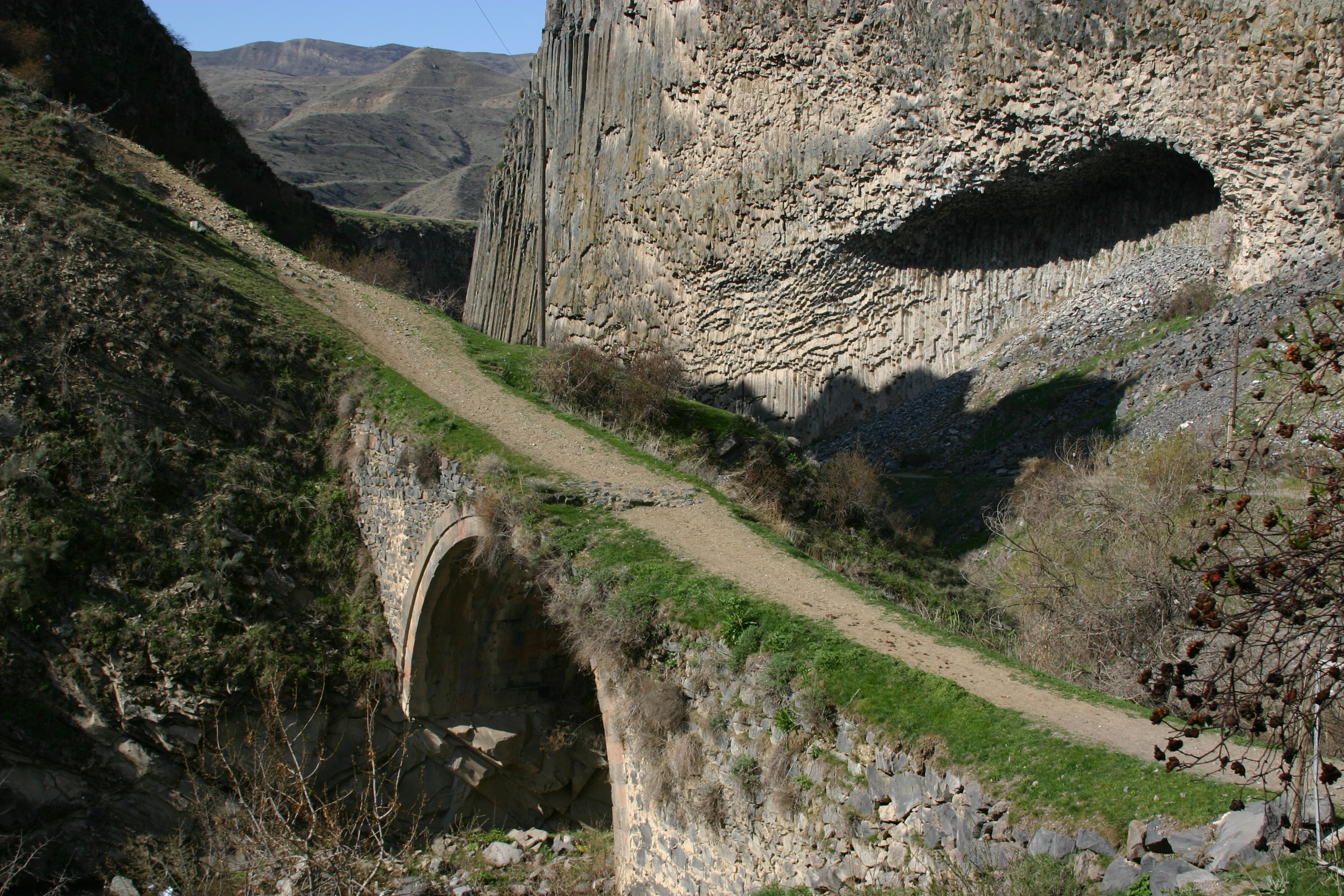
11th-century bridge crossing the Azat River in Garni Gorge (prior to reconstruction)

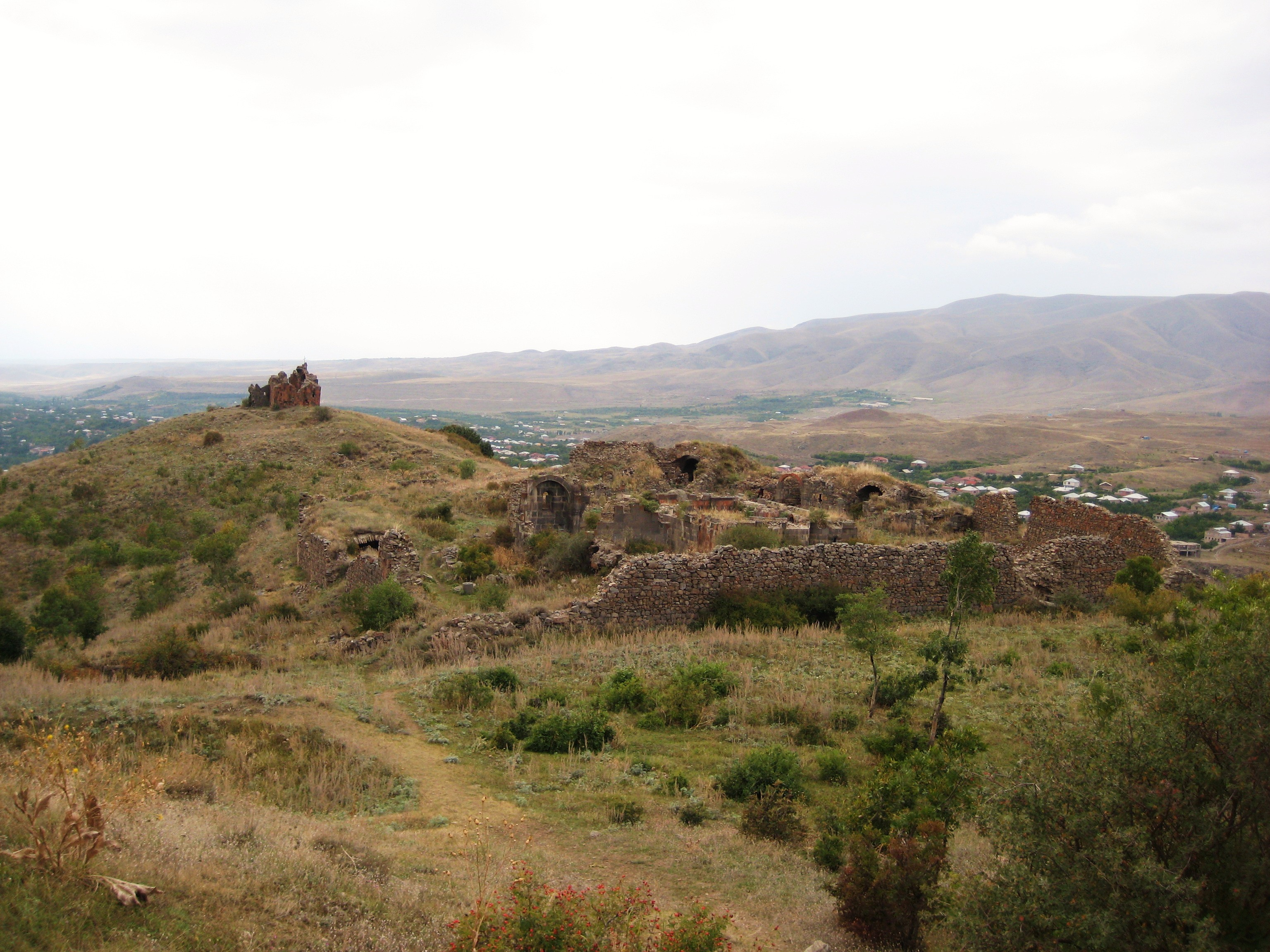
The Havuts Tar Monastic Complex located across the gorge from Garni, 11th-13th centuries

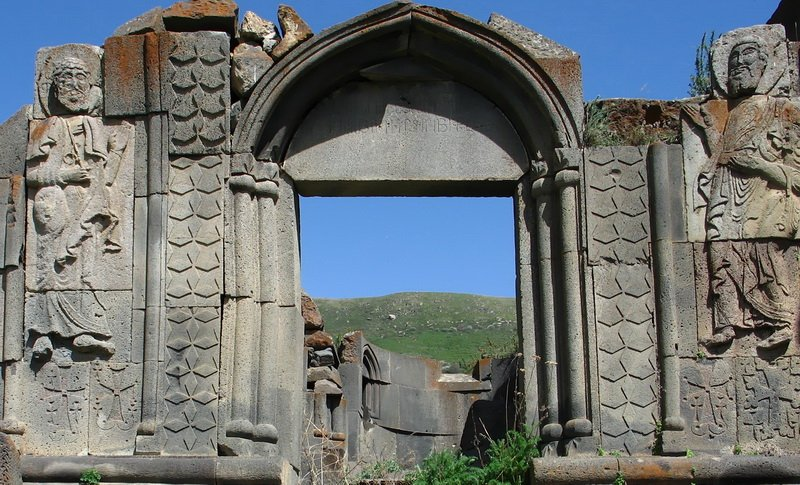
Aghjots Vank of the 13th century located within the Khosrov State Reserve

== See also ==
- Kotayk Province
