= Azat (river) =

River in Armenia

Azat Ազատ գետ
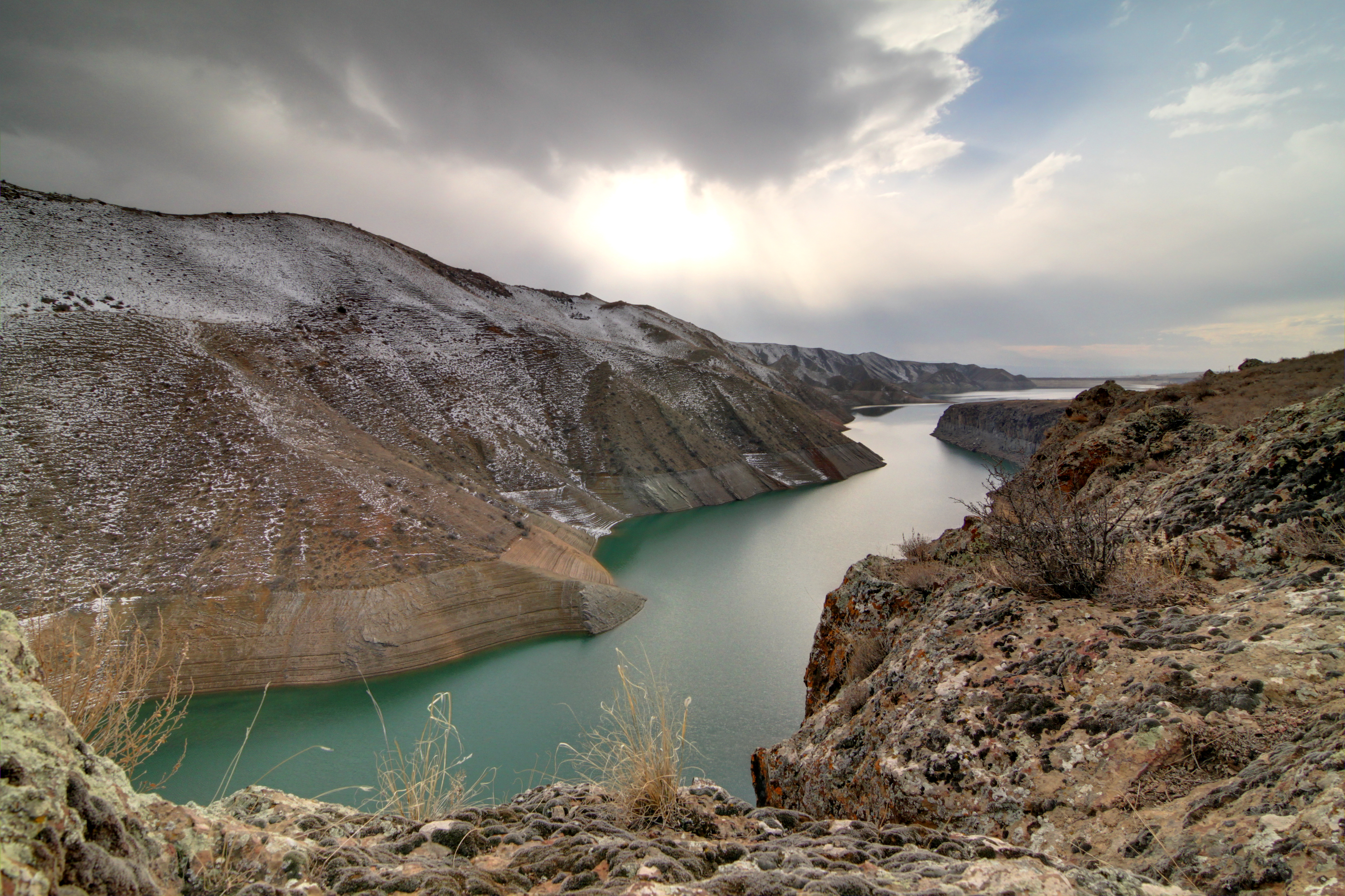
- The Azat River feeding into the Azat Reservoir

Location
- Country: Armenia

Physical characteristics
- Mouth: Aras
  - coordinates: 39.9523°N 44.4874°E

Basin features
- Progression: Aras→ Kura→ Caspian Sea

Azat

Location
- Interactive map of Azat

Architecture
- UNESCO World Heritage Site
- Official name: Monastery of Geghard and the Upper Azat Valley
- Type: Cultural
- Criteria: ii
- Designated: 2000 (24th session)
- Reference no.: 960
- Region: Western Asia

The Azat (Armenian: Ազատ) is a river in the Kotayk Province of Armenia. Its source is on the western slope of the Geghama mountains. It flows through Garni, Lanjazat and Arevshat, before reaching the Aras near Artashat. The main purpose of the Azat dam irrigation and hydro power generation. Its hazard potential is ranked to be high.

The Azat is known in Armenia for its beauty. It flows for 55 kilometers and has a basin that occupies 572 square kilometers. The Azat passes through the Khosrov State Reserve. In its lower reaches, the river flows into the Ararat valley. The Azat is known for its numerous spectacular waterfalls and its rock choked riverbed. Upper Azat Valley was listed to UNESCO world heritage site in 2000 with Geghard Monastery.

== Symphony of Stones ==
One section of the Azat, where it meets River Goght, is particularly fascinating. It passes through the Canyon of Garni composed of regular hexagonal prisms, with a formation so unique it almost looks artificial. Near its end, the gorge's formation has prompted the name "Symphony of Stones".

== Gallery ==
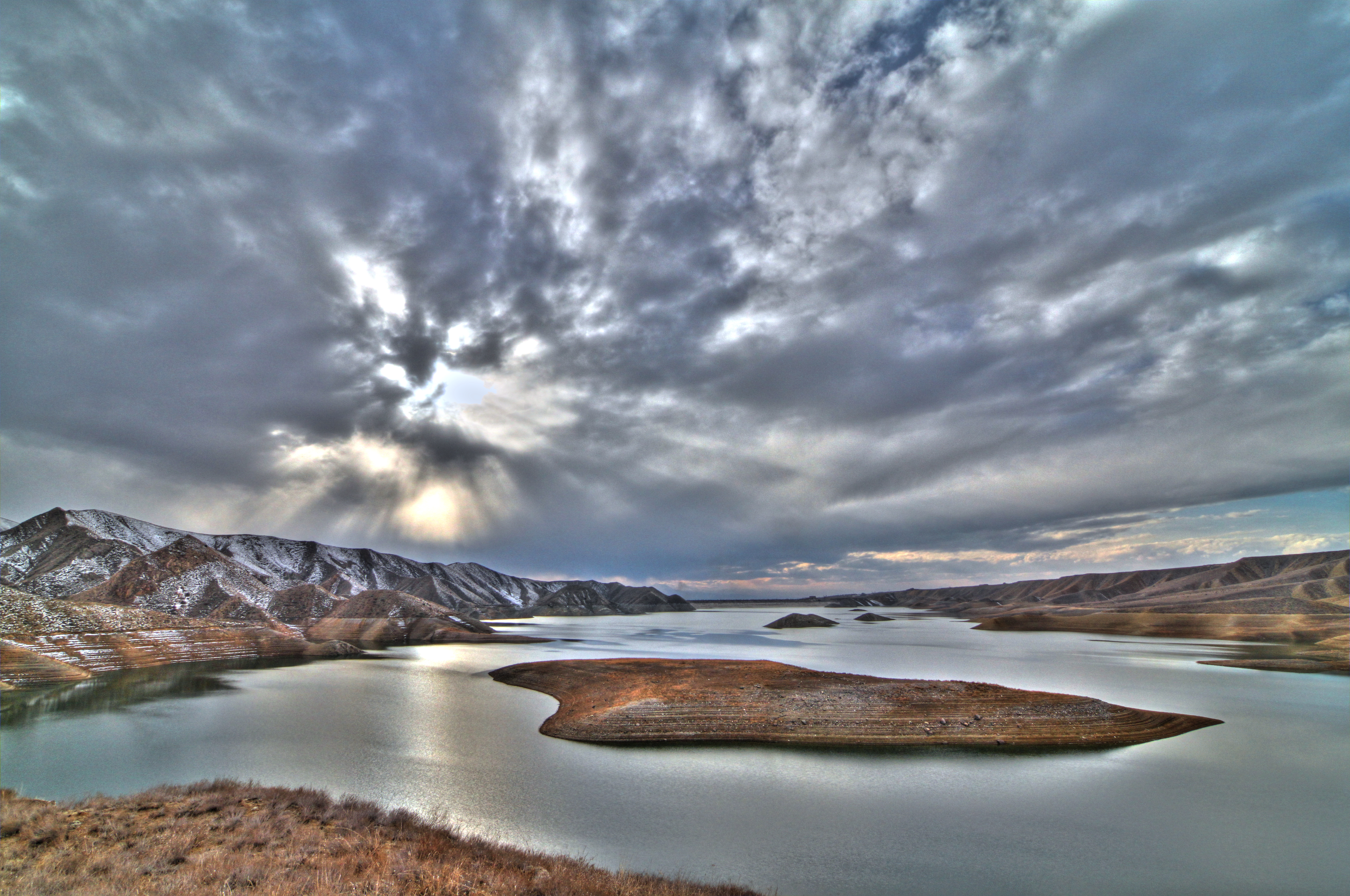
Azat Reservoir

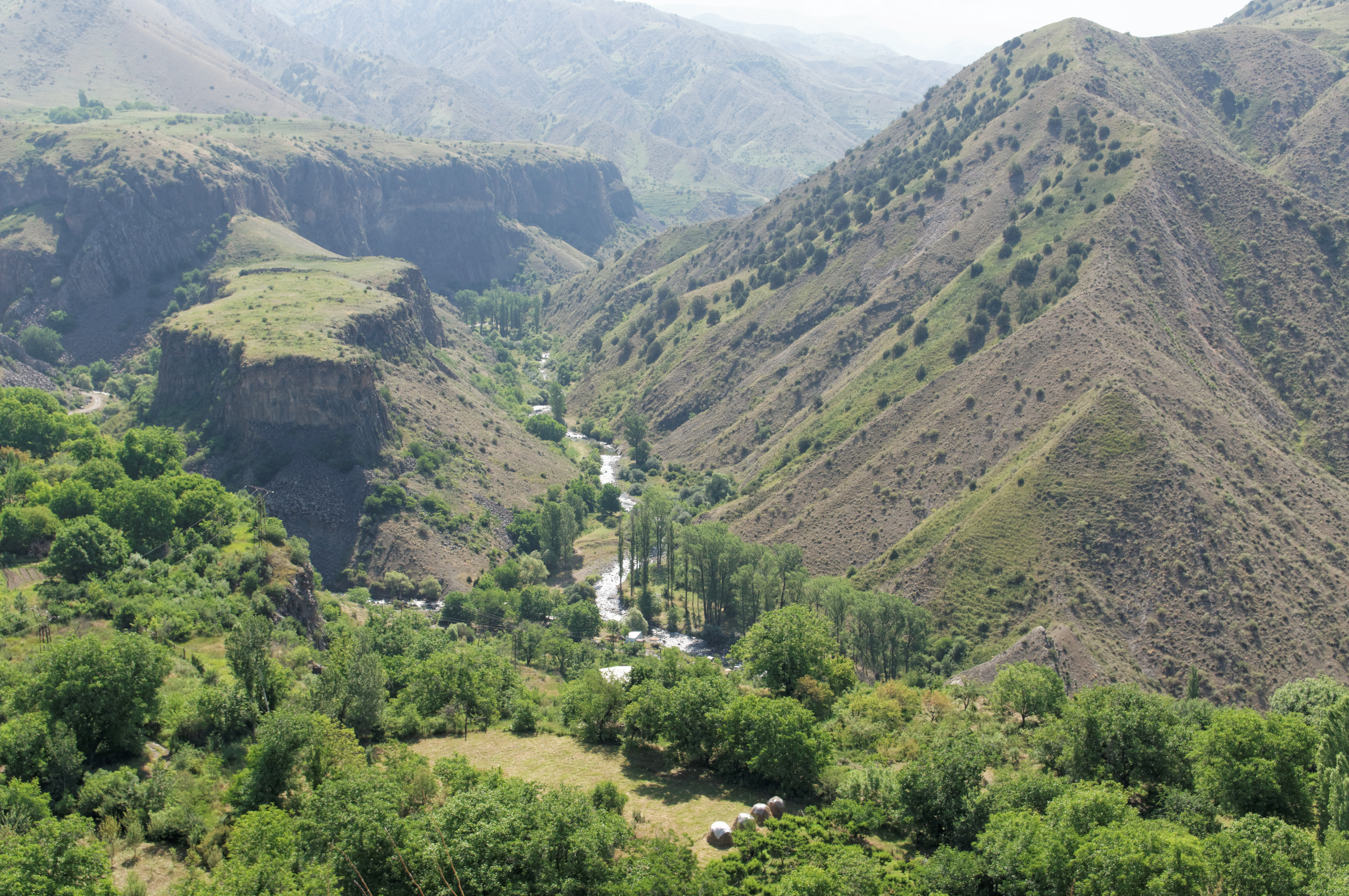
Azat river at Garni

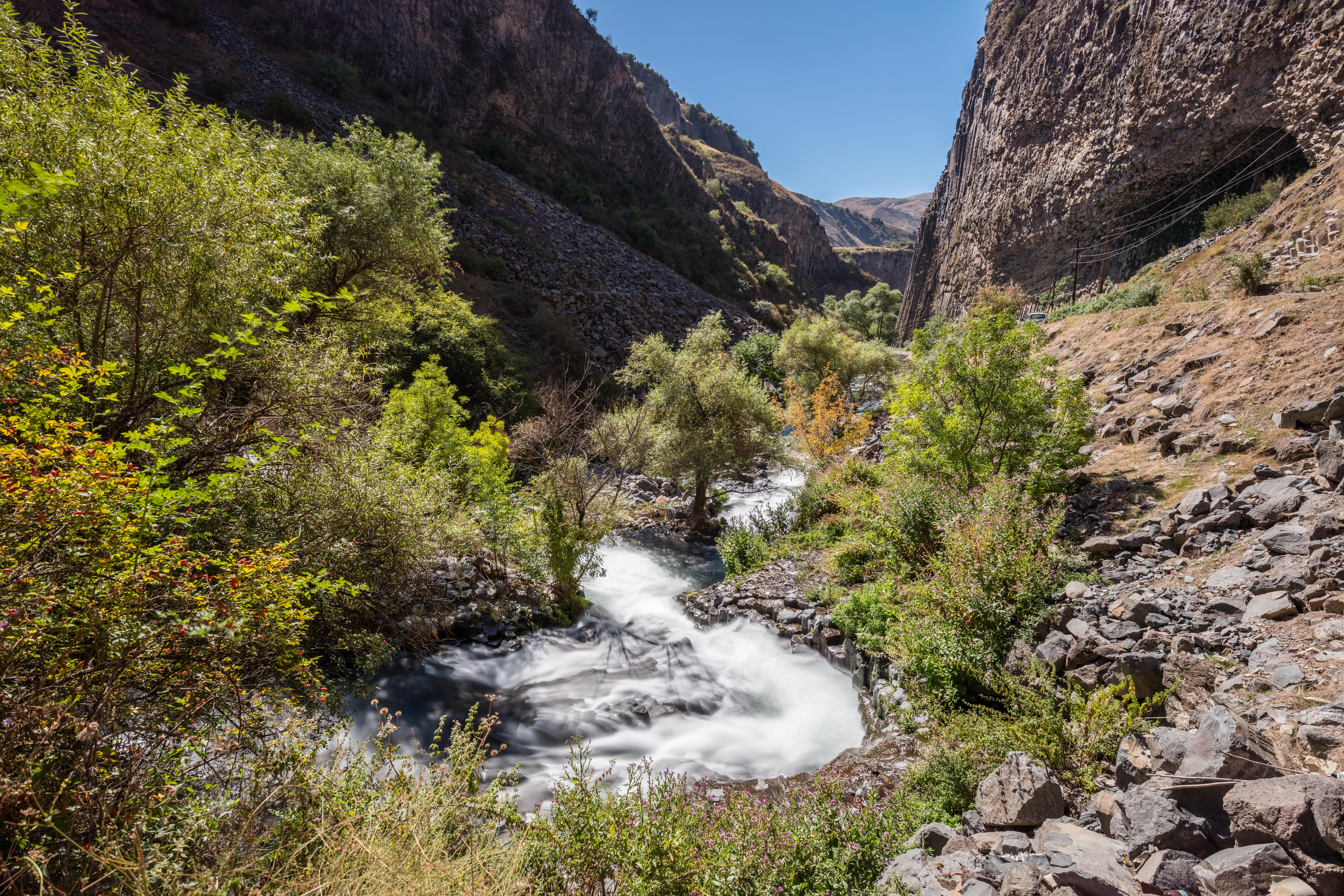

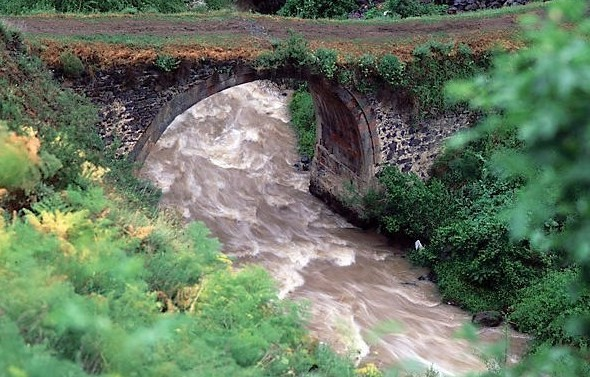
The Azat River passing under an old style bridge

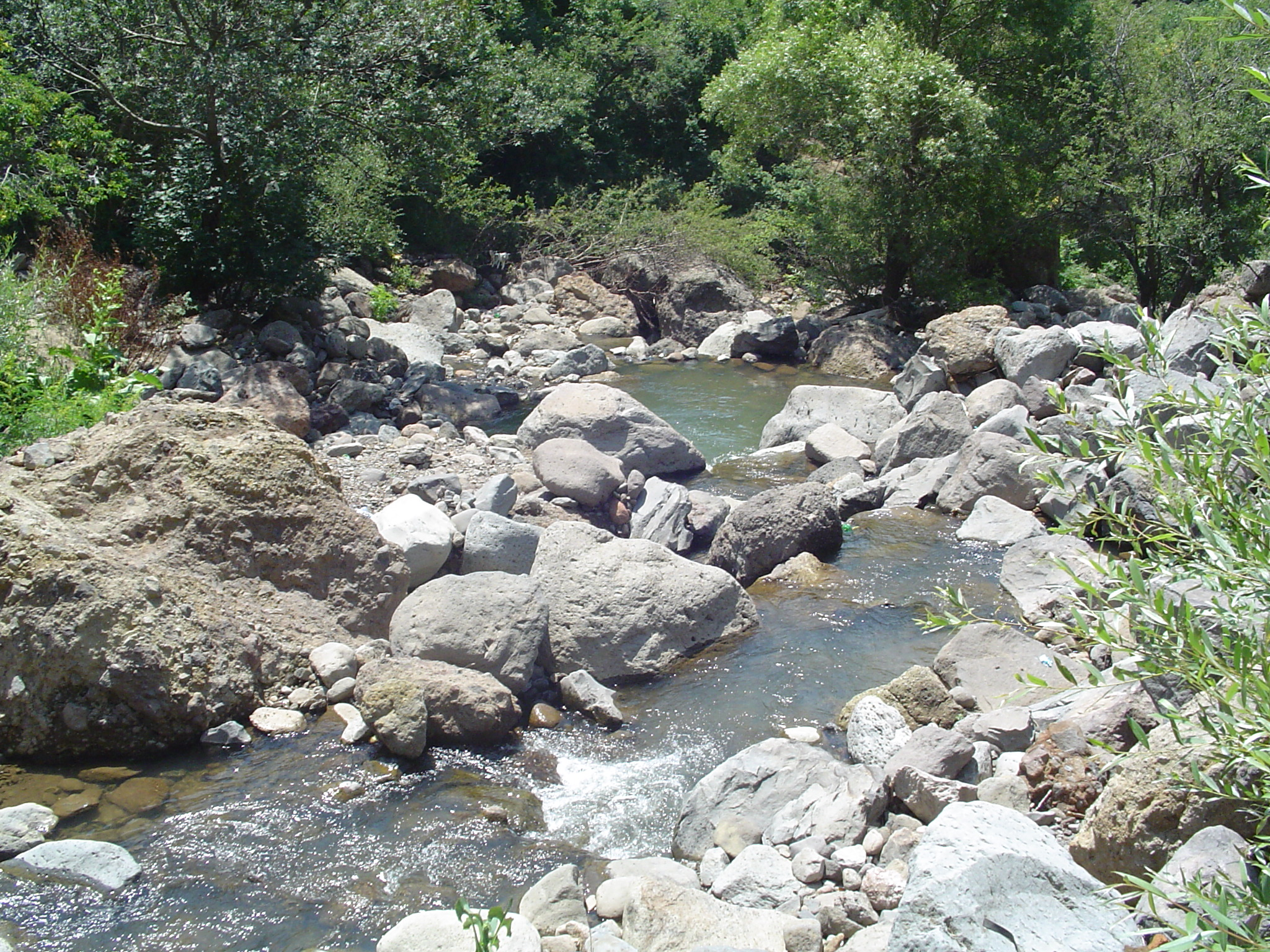
Azat river at Geghard

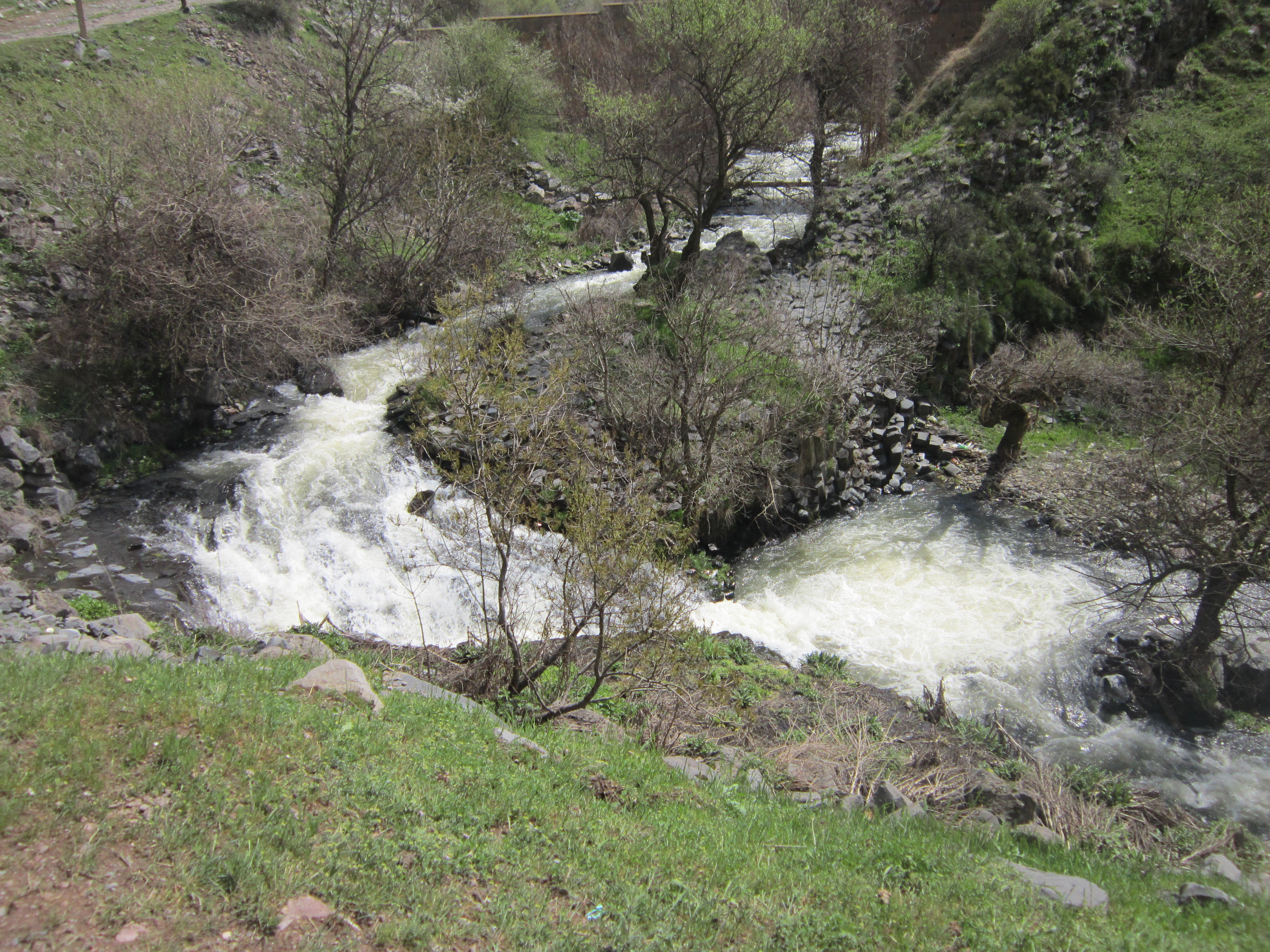

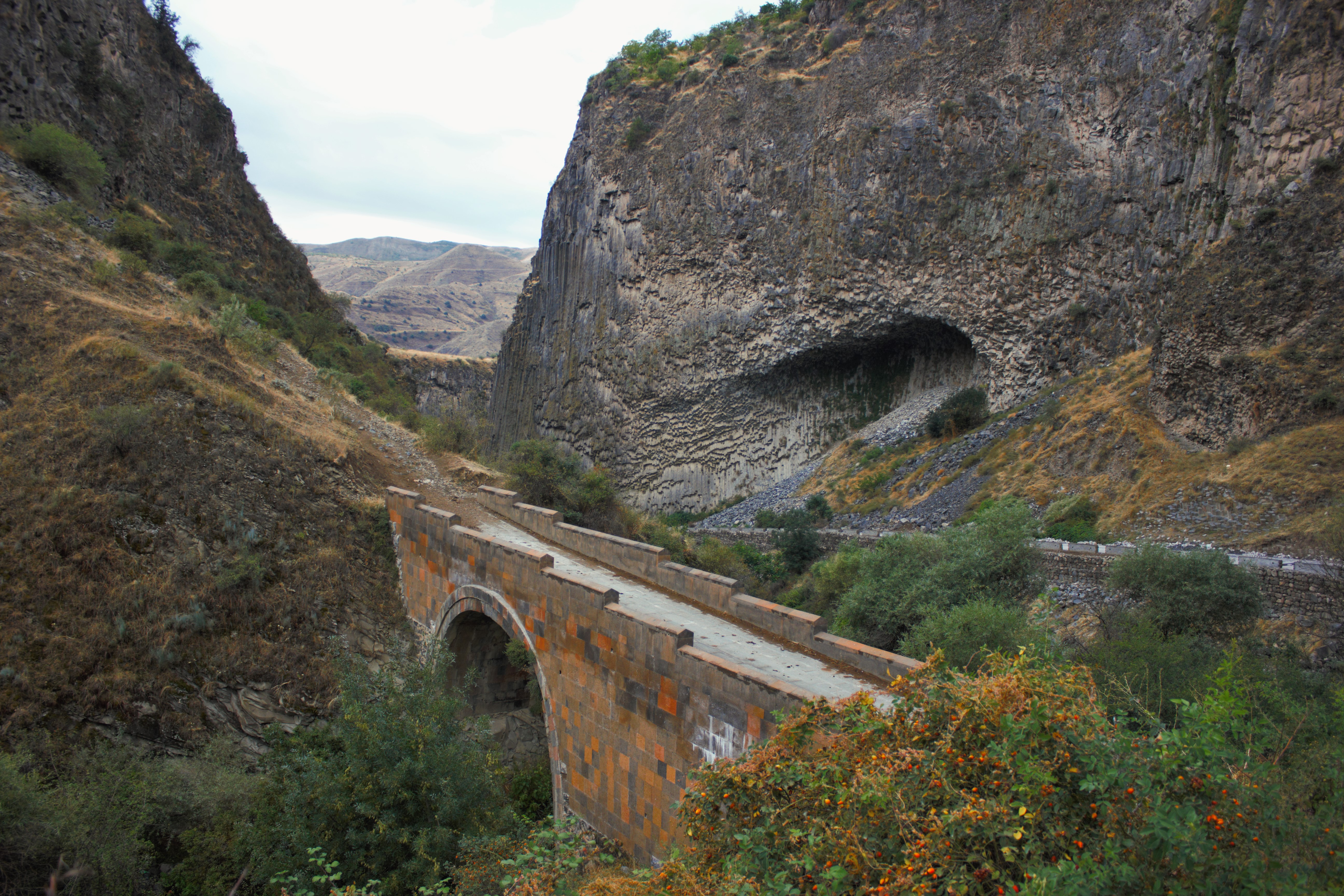
Azat river among the bridge IX century, and Symphony of Stones

== See also ==
- Geography of Armenia
- List of rivers of Armenia
- List of lakes of Armenia
