= Garni Gorge =

Gorge in Armenia

Coordinates: 40°07′10″N 44°43′23″E

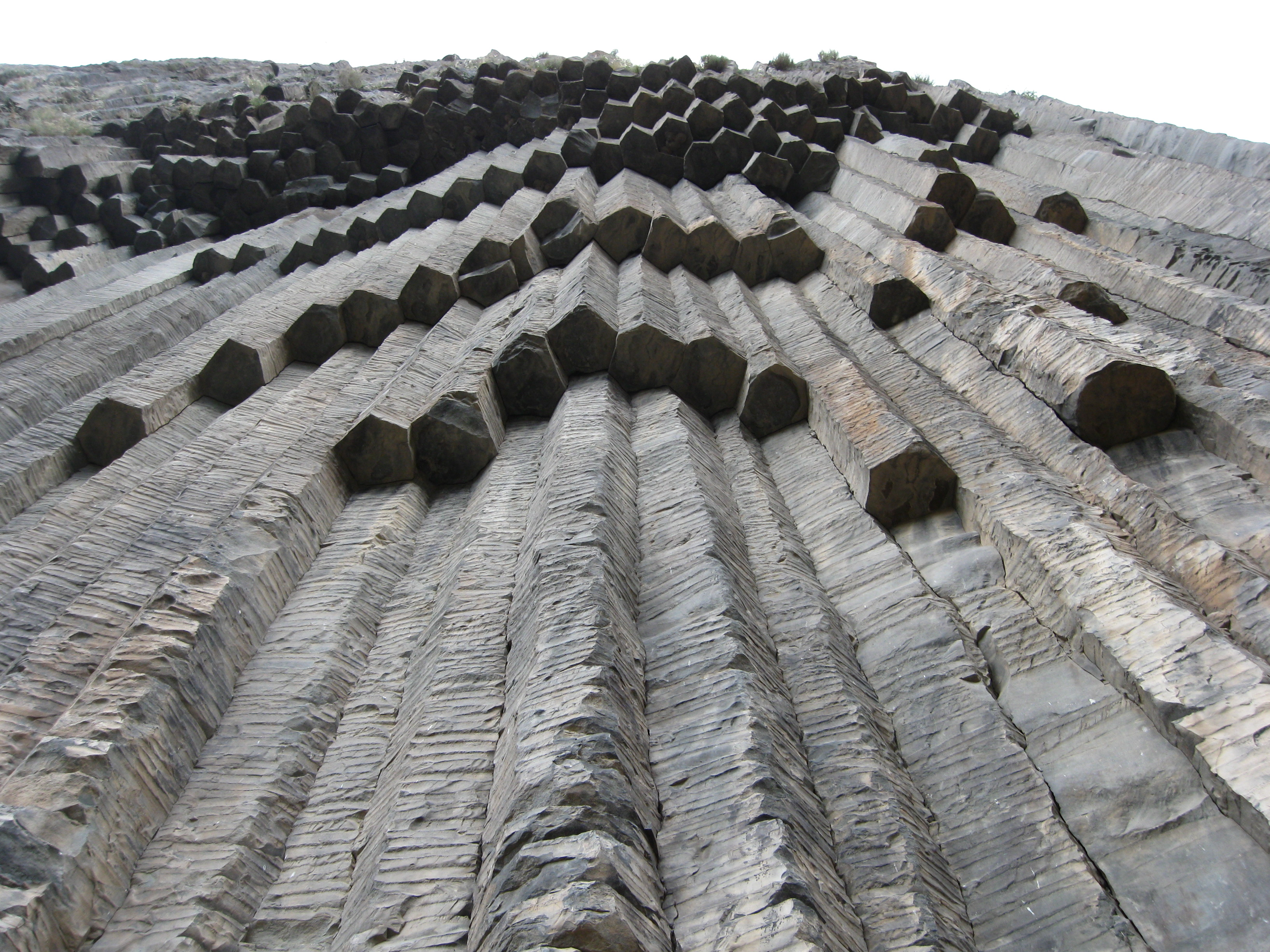
Garni Gorge

The Garni Gorge is a river gorge carved by the Azat river in Kotayk Province, Armenia. It is situated 23.3 kilometres (14.5 mi) east of Yerevan, Armenia, south of the village of the same name. The Garni Gorge is protected by law and listed as a natural monument. On a promontory above the gorge, the first-century AD Temple of Garni may be seen. The Garni Temple was built by King Tiridates I as a temple to the sun god Mihr (Mithra). Along the sides of the gorge are cliff walls of well-preserved hexagonal basalt columns, formed by ancient volcanic activity and slow cooling. This portion of the Garni Gorge is typically referred to as the "Symphony of the Stones" or the "Basalt Organ". It is most easily reached via a road that leads left down the gorge just before reaching the temple of Garni. Another road leads to the gorge through the village, down a cobblestone road, and into the valley. Once in the valley, turning right will lead to Garni Gorge, an 11th-century medieval bridge, and the "Symphony of the Stones". Taking a left will lead along the river past a fish hatchery, up to the Khosrov Forest State Reserve, and a little further Havuts Tar Monastery.

The ancient Geghard Monastery, a UNESCO World Heritage Site, is also within walking distance. Partially carved into the mountain, the monastery has existed since the fourth century AD. The main cathedral was built much later, in the thirteenth century.

== Gallery ==
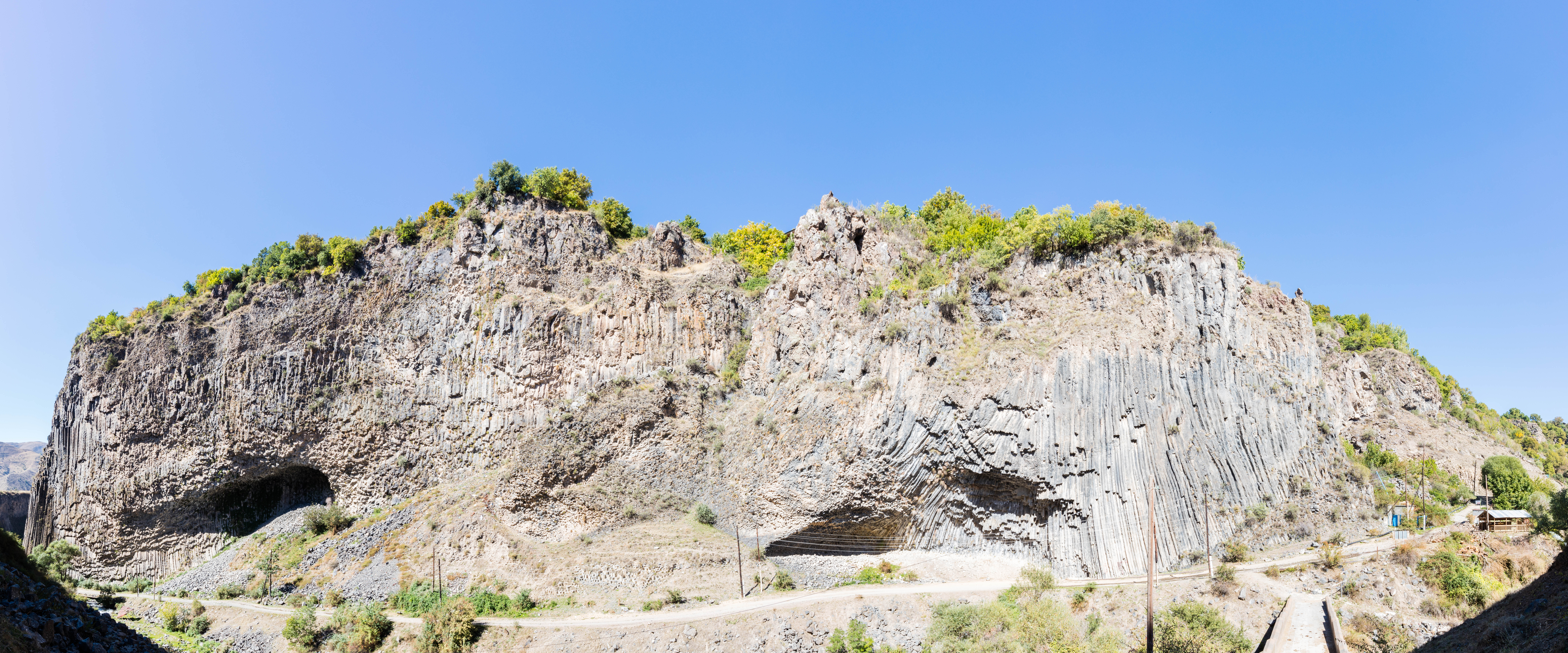

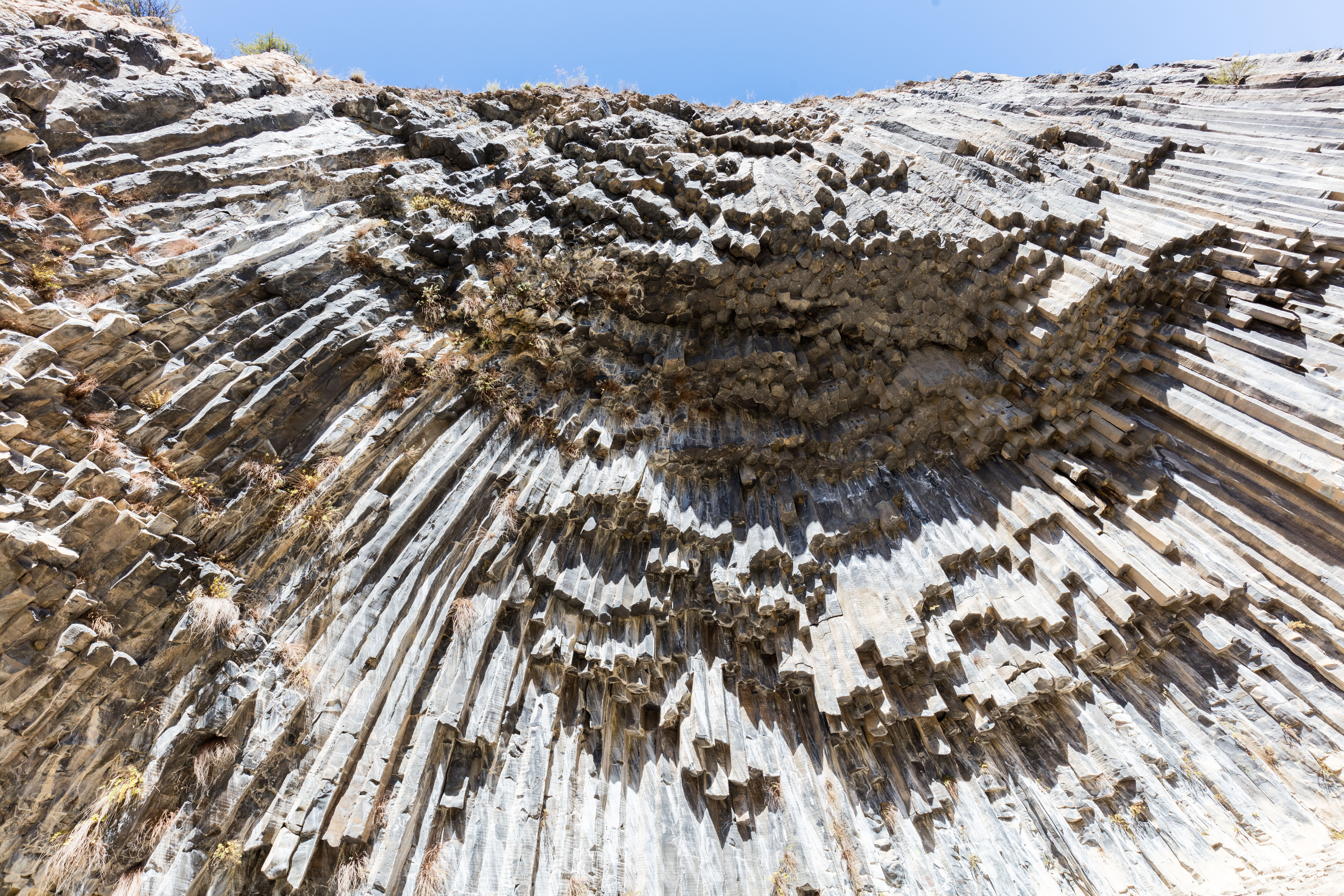
Example of basalt columns ("Symphony of the Stones") along Garni gorge

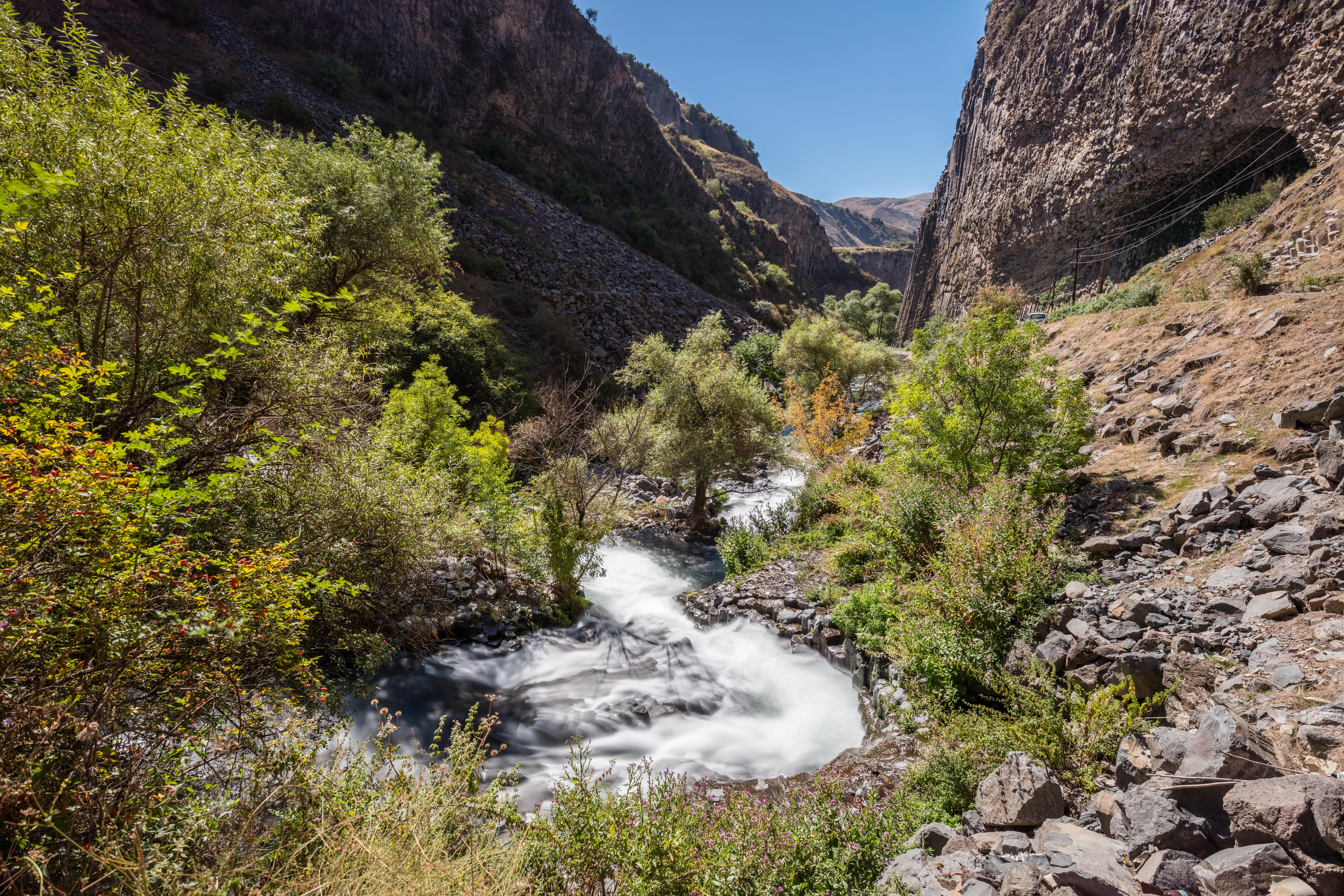
Garni valley

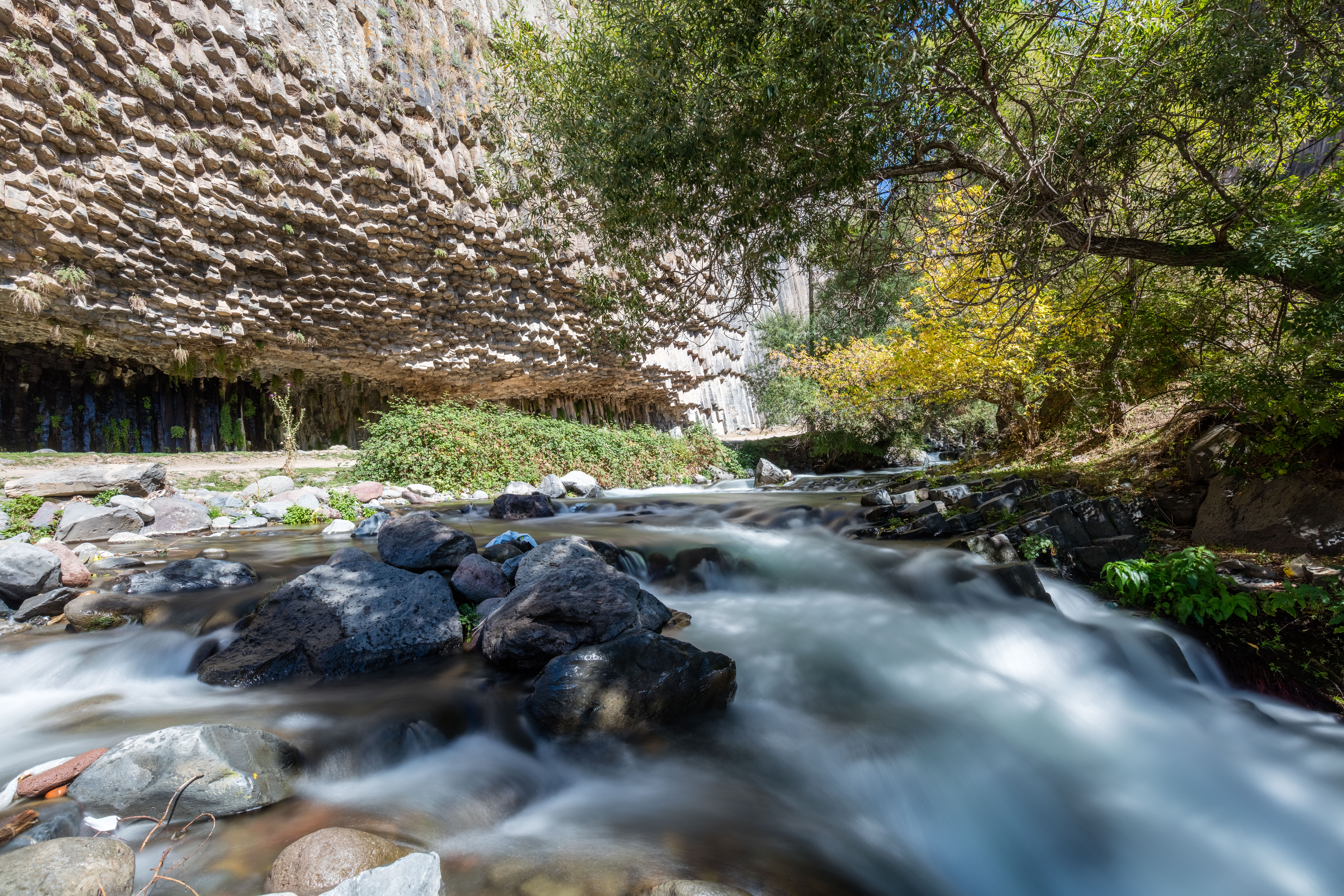
Garni stream

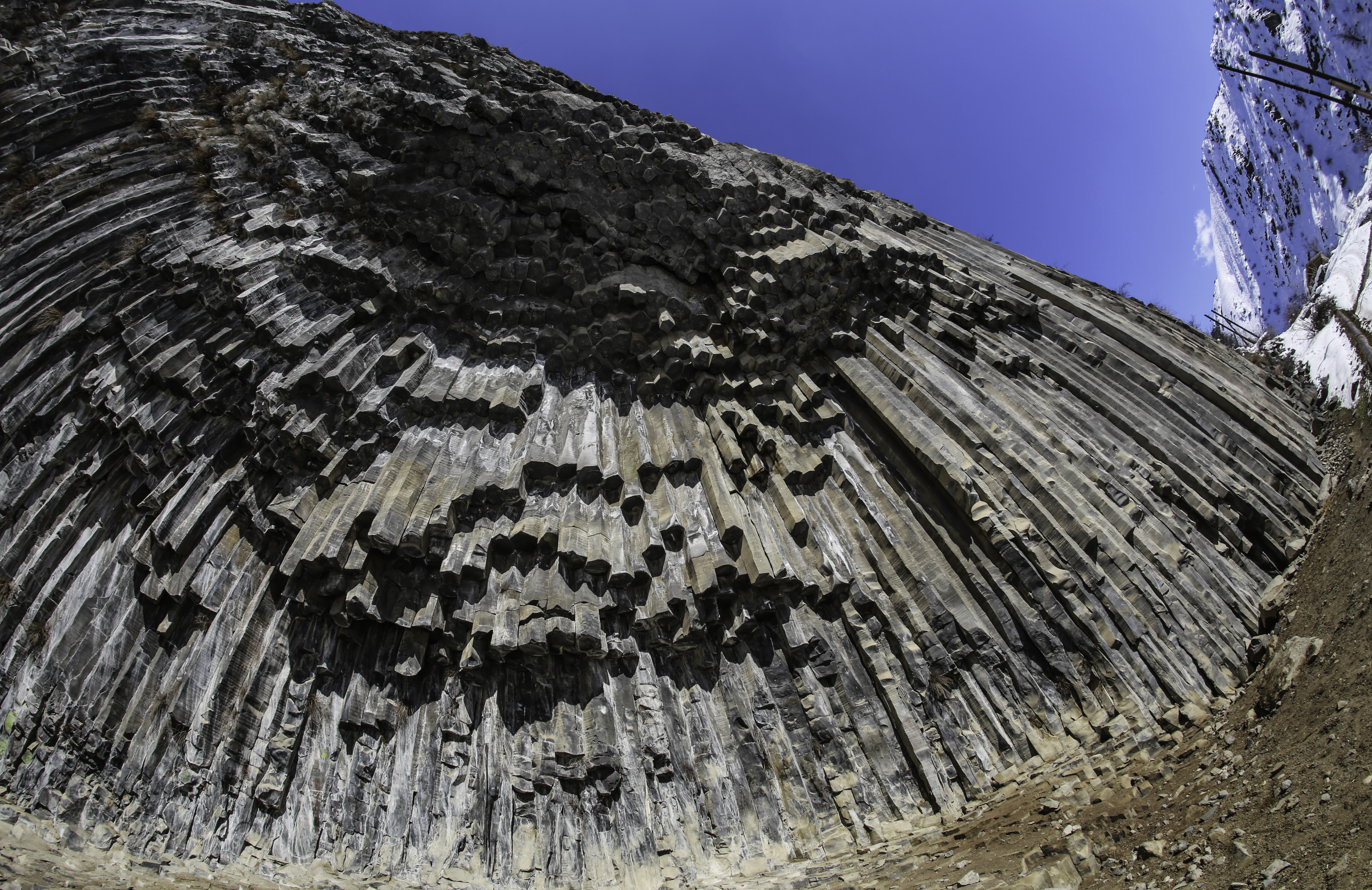
Symphony of stones

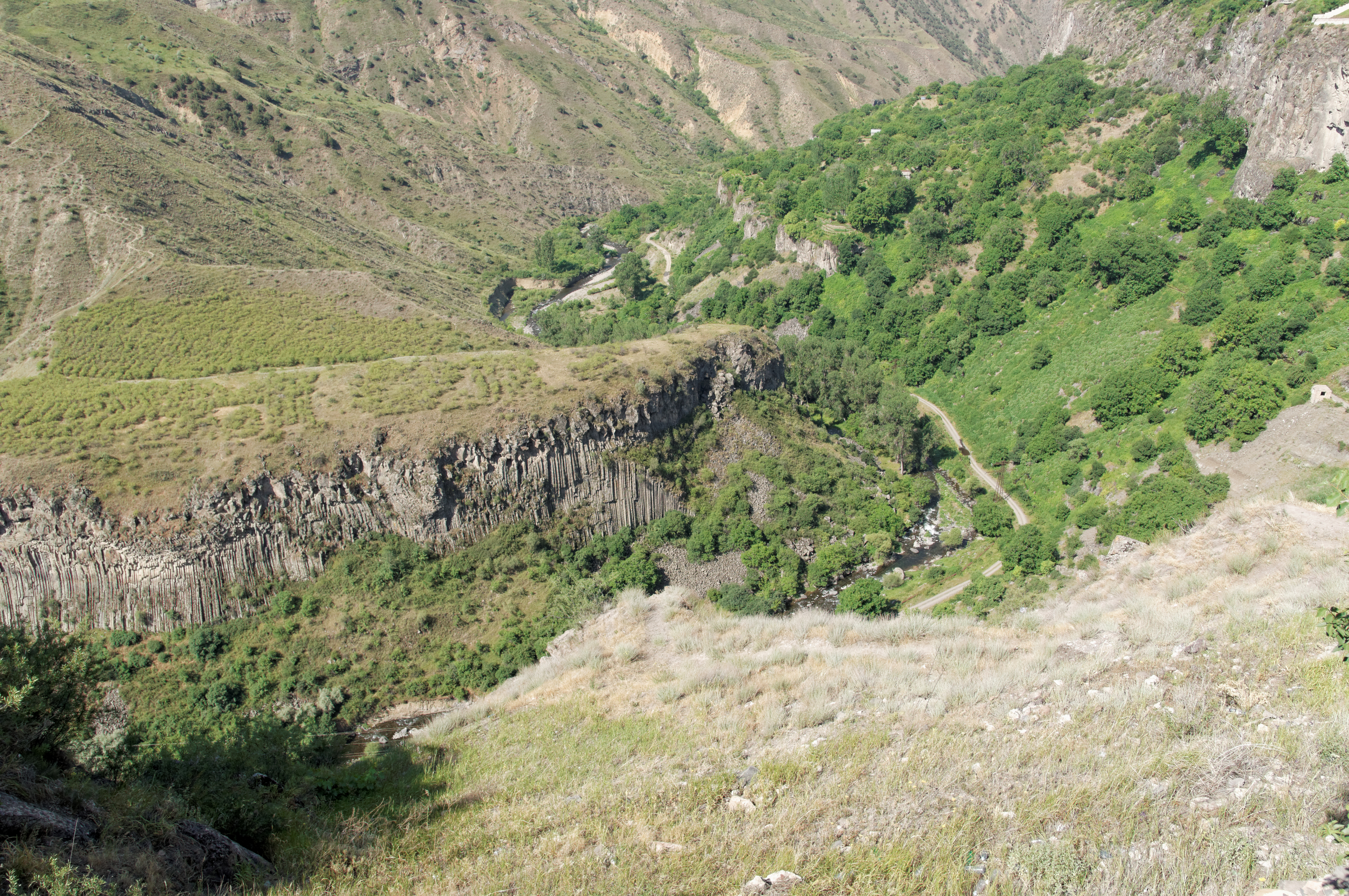
Panoramic view of Garni Gorge and the "Symphony of the Stones" basalt rock formations
