= Gagik Apumrvan Artsruni =

Gagik Abumrvan Artsruni (or Abu Marwan) was an Armenian prince of the Artsruni line. In 887 he was installed as regent of Vaspurakan and guardian of the three under-age sons of Grigor-Derenik Artsruni, but ended up usurping their place. In the end, as the dispossessed princes sought Muslim aid, Gagik secured the support of the Armenian king, Smbat I Bagratuni, and in 896/7 was formally recognized as prince of Vaspurakan. He ruled until he was killed in 898 by the middle of the three brothers, Gagik (the future first King of Vaspurakan), and was succeeded by Gagik's eldest brother, Ashot-Sargis Artsruni.

== Sources ==
- Ter-Ghewondyan, Aram (1976). The Arab Emirates in Bagratid Armenia. Transl. Nina G. Garsoïan. Lisbon: Livraria Bertrand. pp. 63–64. OCLC 490638192.

Regnal titles
Preceded by Grigor-Derenik Artsruni	Prince of Vaspurakan; 896–898	Succeeded by Ashot-Sargis Artsruni
