= Khosrov Forest State Reserve =

Nature reserve in Armenia

- IUCN category Ia (strict nature reserve)
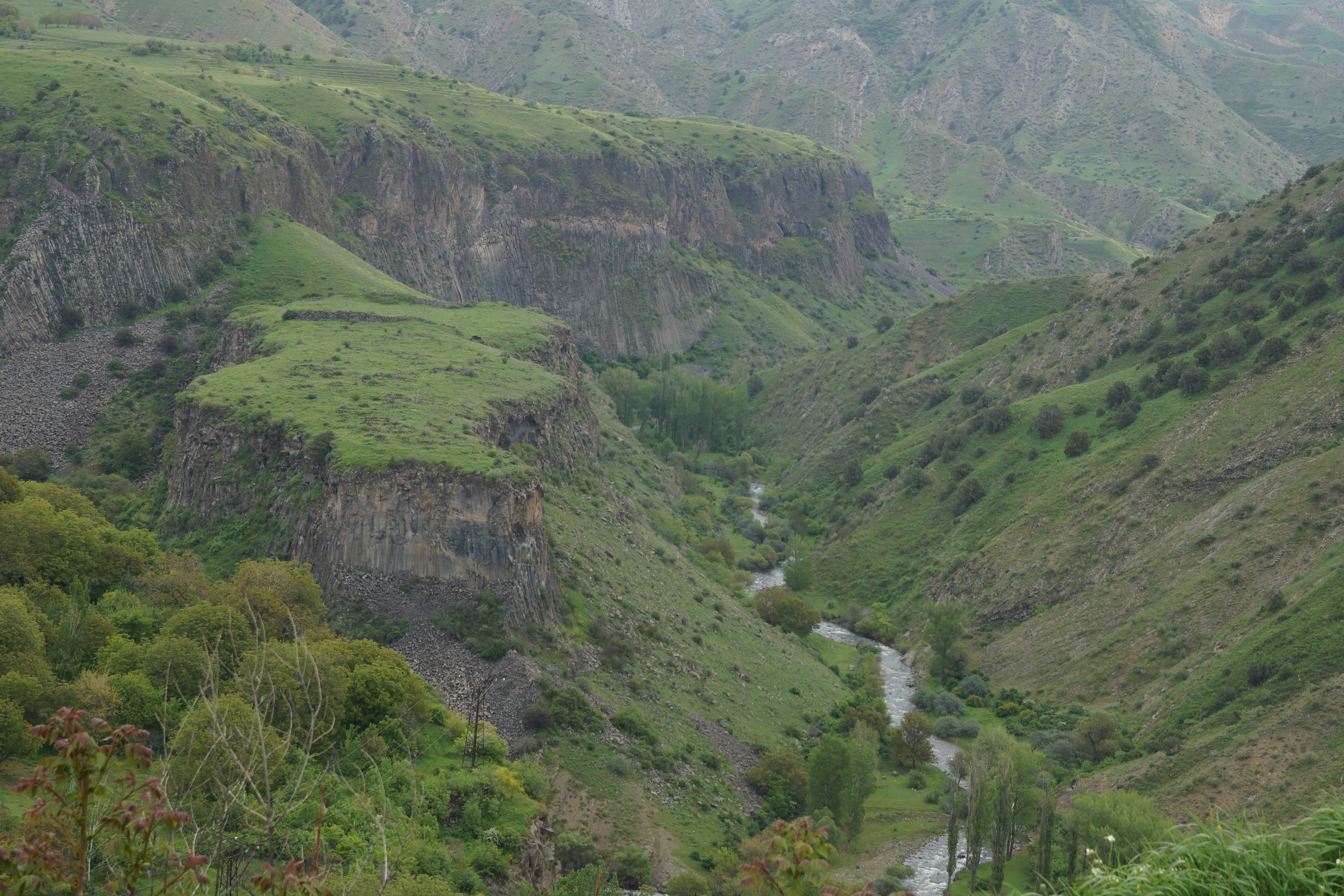
- Khosrov Forest State Reserve

- Location within Armenia
- Location: Armenia
- Coordinates: 40°2′44.9″N 44°53′53.7″E
- Area: 232.13 km^{2} (89.63 sq mi)
- Established: 1958
- Governing body: Ministry of Nature Protection, Armenia

Khosrov Forest State Reserve (Armenian: Խոսրովի անտառ պետական արգելոց, romanized: Khosrovi antarr petakan argelots') is a nature reserve in Ararat Province of Armenia. The reserve is one of the oldest protected areas in the world having a history of about 1,700 years. It was founded in the 4th century (334–338) by the order of king Khosrov Kotak, who gave it his name. It was founded to improve the natural climatic conditions of adjacent territories of Artashat – the capital city of Armenia of the given period and the newly established city of Dvin to ensure conservation and enrichment of flora and fauna; serve as a ground for royal hunting, military exercises and entertainment.

This area was designated as a state reserve in September 1958 and covers around 23,213.5 hectares (57,362 acres) at elevations from 700 to 2,800 m (9,200 ft) above sea level. The Khosrov reserve protects juniper (Juniperus polycarpos) and oak (Quercus macranthera) forests from Tertiary Period, arid associations of semi-desert and phrygana landscapes and other Mediterranean relict plant ecosystems as well as the genetic fund of rare animals and plants adapted to the reserve conditions. It also includes wetlands of international importance. Khosrov Forest State Reserve, thanks to its numerous peculiarities, is unique not only in Armenia but also in the whole Caucasus ecoregion.

Since 2002, administrative, scientific, practical and organizational activities in the reserve have been implemented by the Khosrov Forest State Reserve State Non-Commercial Organization (SNCO) of the Bioresources Management Agency under the aegis of the Ministry of Nature Protection of Armenia. According to the reserved charter (RA Governmental decision N 925 from 30 May 2002, Annex 1), the main goals of the reserve establishment are to ensure natural development of water and terrestrial ecosystems of the rivers Azat and Vedi basins, to protect the landscapes and biological diversity including the genetic fund of rare and endangered plants and animals as well as their habitats, to implement scientific research and to create prerequisites for the development of scientific and educational tourism, environmental education and responsibility.

The following protected areas are under the subordination of the Khosrov Forest State Reserve: SNCO:

- Khosrov Forest state reserve, which at present is divided into four districts- Garni (4253ha), Kaqavaberd (4745ha), Khosrov (6860.8ha), and Khachadzor (7354.7ha).
- Goravan Sands state sanctuary (95.99ha)
- Khor Virap State Sanctuary (50.28ha)

Realizing the importance of the reserve, on 26 August 2013 Khosrov Forest State Reserve SNCO was awarded the European Diploma of Protected Areas.

The reserve has wonderful landscapes, rich biological diversity, a huge variety of interesting and important untouched forests that are the result of long-term preservation, proper management plan and structure. The Khosrov Forest is the evidence of the Armenians' caring attitude towards historical monuments. Thanks to their attitude, the virgin forest located near Yerevan, the current capital of Armenia, has been preserved for 17 centuries.

== History of the reserve ==
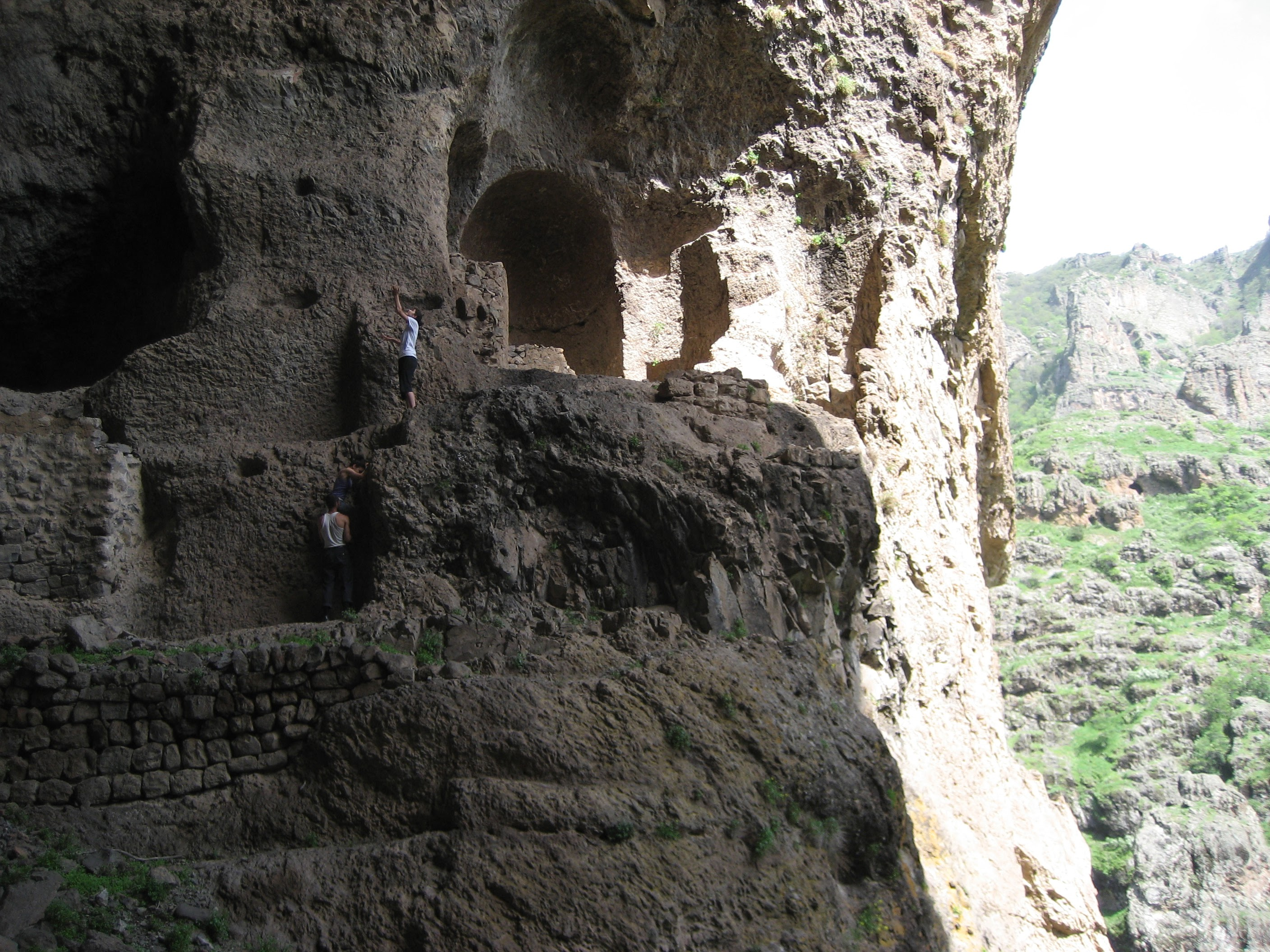
Ancient inhabited caves along the Azat River Canyon

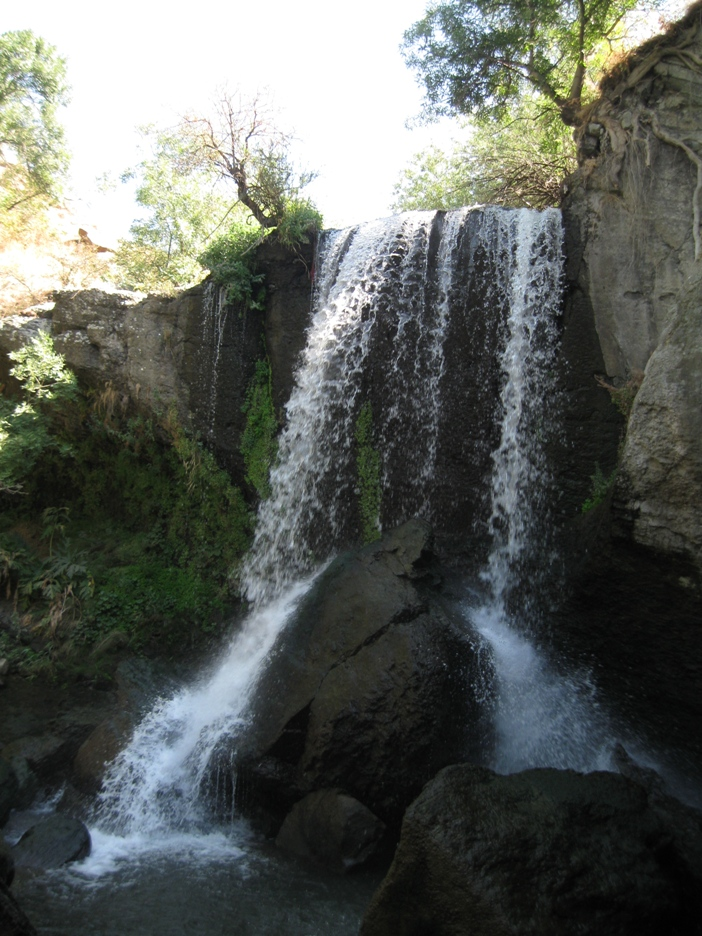
One of the waterfalls of Azat River in the Khosrov Forest

The reserve has enjoyed a long-term reputation of a forest tract with spectacular scenery and a rich historical legacy which is the closest piece of pristine nature to the capital agglomeration. Wildlife conservation and nature protection began in Armenia many centuries ago.

The reserve was founded by King Khosrov III of the Kingdom of Armenia who ruled from 330 until 339, whom the reserve is named after. Khosrov ordered the forest to be a reserve to improve the natural-climatic conditions of the adjacent city of Artashat to ensure conservation and enrichment of flora and fauna. He also ordered plantation of trees on the high slope of the mountains. It also served as a royal ground for hunting, to complete military exercises and entertainment. Later the forest was enriched with hunting animals brought in from other places, especially from Iran. This reserve that Khosrov had founded was the only state forest reserve in the Roman Empire and among the first in that region. Khosrov was the first Christian monarch as a ruler of state to establish a conservation reserve and was the only known monarch as a descendant of the Diadochi, and a distant relation of Greek King Alexander the Great and as a distant paternal relation of the Persian King Darius I to do so.

According to Faustus of Byzantium, there were two fenced forests one called 'Tachar Mayri' (Sacred Forest) and 'Khosrovakert', which both of them were established on both banks of the Azat River. The Tachar Mayri forest started from the Garni Temple and stretched to the city of Dvin. Khosrovakert was established between Artashat and Dvin along the reeds. Over centuries the Khosrovakert disappeared and the remaining Tachar Mayri was later merger with the natural forest. Another Armenian historian Moses of Chorene, mentions in his writings the history of the forest. According to Moses of Chorene, the expression 'Khosrov Forest' is associated with King Khosrov. Also people in Armenia perpetuate the name of King Khosrov not only to the name of the forest but to settlement, river and mountain (Khosrovasar Mountain) of the monarch's name. The Silk Road had passed through the territory of the reserve.

In the era of the Soviet Union the Khosrov Forest was set aside as forestry and on 13 September 1958 the Garni Forestry was granted a status of Khosrov (then Garni) Reserve. The size of the reserve then was 148.61 km^{2} (57.38 sq mi). The reserve became a protected area because the high-quality freshwater supplies the Azat River, which flows down to Yerevan and the surrendering forests. In 1990 the reserve became 291.96 km^{2} (112.73 sq mi) which some adjacent lands were incorporated in it and in 2006–2007, the reserve was reduced to 238.78 km^{2} (92.19 sq mi).

The reserve has been official status to the IUCN Ia category. Since 1995, the reserve has been subordinated to the Ministry of Nature of Protection of Armenia, managed through its Agency for Biological Resources Management and operating as the Khosrov Reserve non-profit organisation. Between 2006 and 2007, a process was underway to develop and approve a management plan for the reserve which aims to improve the reserve's environmental and socio-economic status which came from a 1993 compliance from the Convention on Biological Diversity.

In the first quarter of 2008, rural schoolchildren in the largest villages adjoining the reserve were involved in an awareness-raising program about the reserve. Among the programs was the campaign on leopard conservation as the reserve is one of the 'hotpots' for the Persian leopard. On 9 September 2008 the Visitor Center in the Garni district of the reserve was opened for the visiting public and tourists to educate visitors and bring awareness about the reserve on its natural and human history. On 4 April 2012 the reserve was awarded with a European environmental and conservation diploma from the Council of Europe.

== Geology ==
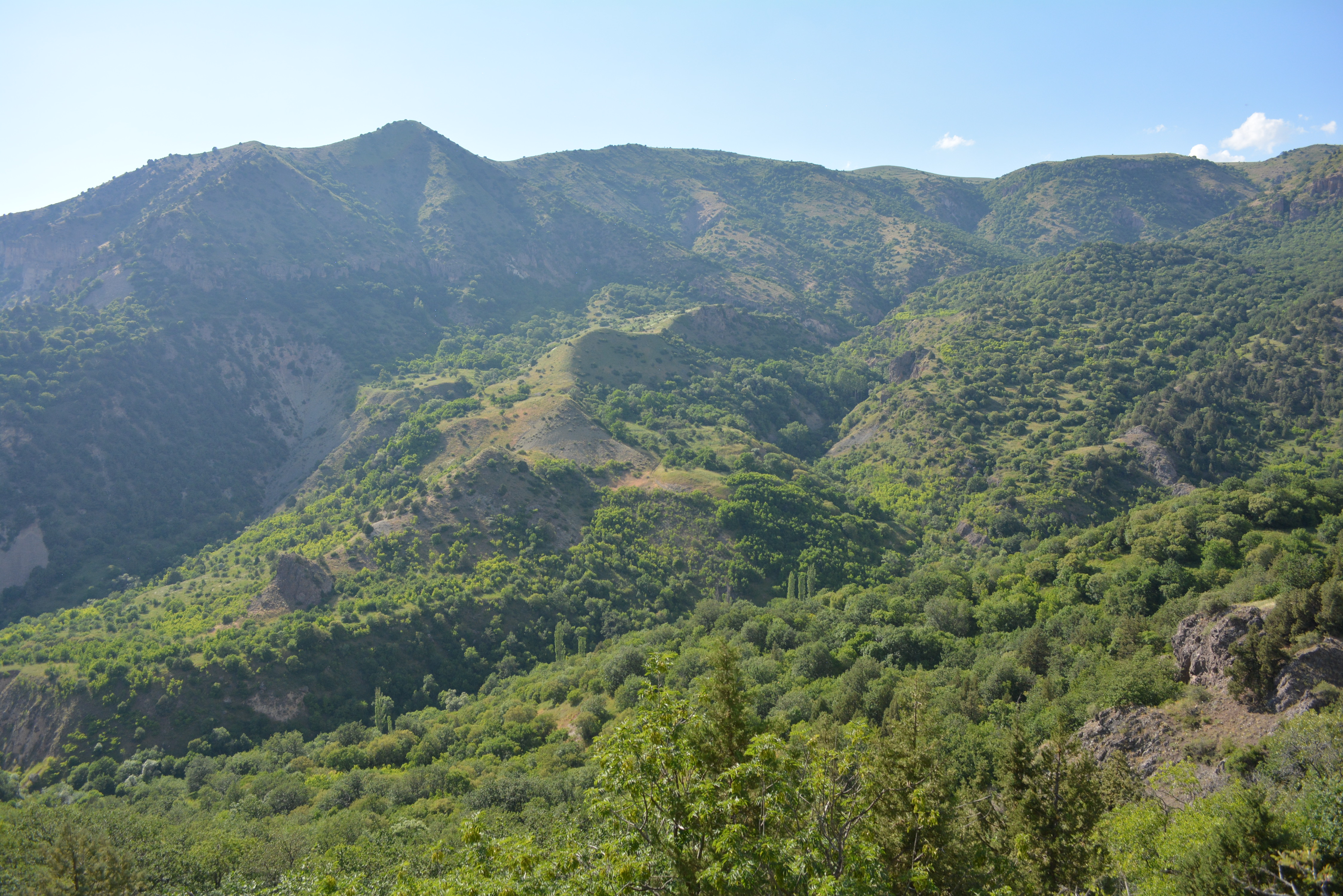

The reserve's geology is rugged and has a typical mountain range, encompassing a dense network of main and branch ridges, high plateaus and deep canyons towered by volcanic shield massifs and peaks. There are traces of past tectonic activity of various faults and fractures. The rocks, volcanic deposits and igneous intrusions dates back to the Cretaceous and pre-Oligocene periods. The dominating rocks are Quaternary fragmental debris and effusive. Due to the hot weather and impact of water, there is an intense eolian process that has shaped the numerous natural geological figures and most slopes are steep, with declivity exceeding 30°. Middle elevations of the belt are 1,500–2,300 m (4,900–7,500 ft) above sea level covers about half of the territory of the reserve representing highly rough terrain composed of fold and detrital ridges. A low elevation of the belt below 1,500 m (4,900 ft) is marked by vast areas of badlands.

== Water resources ==
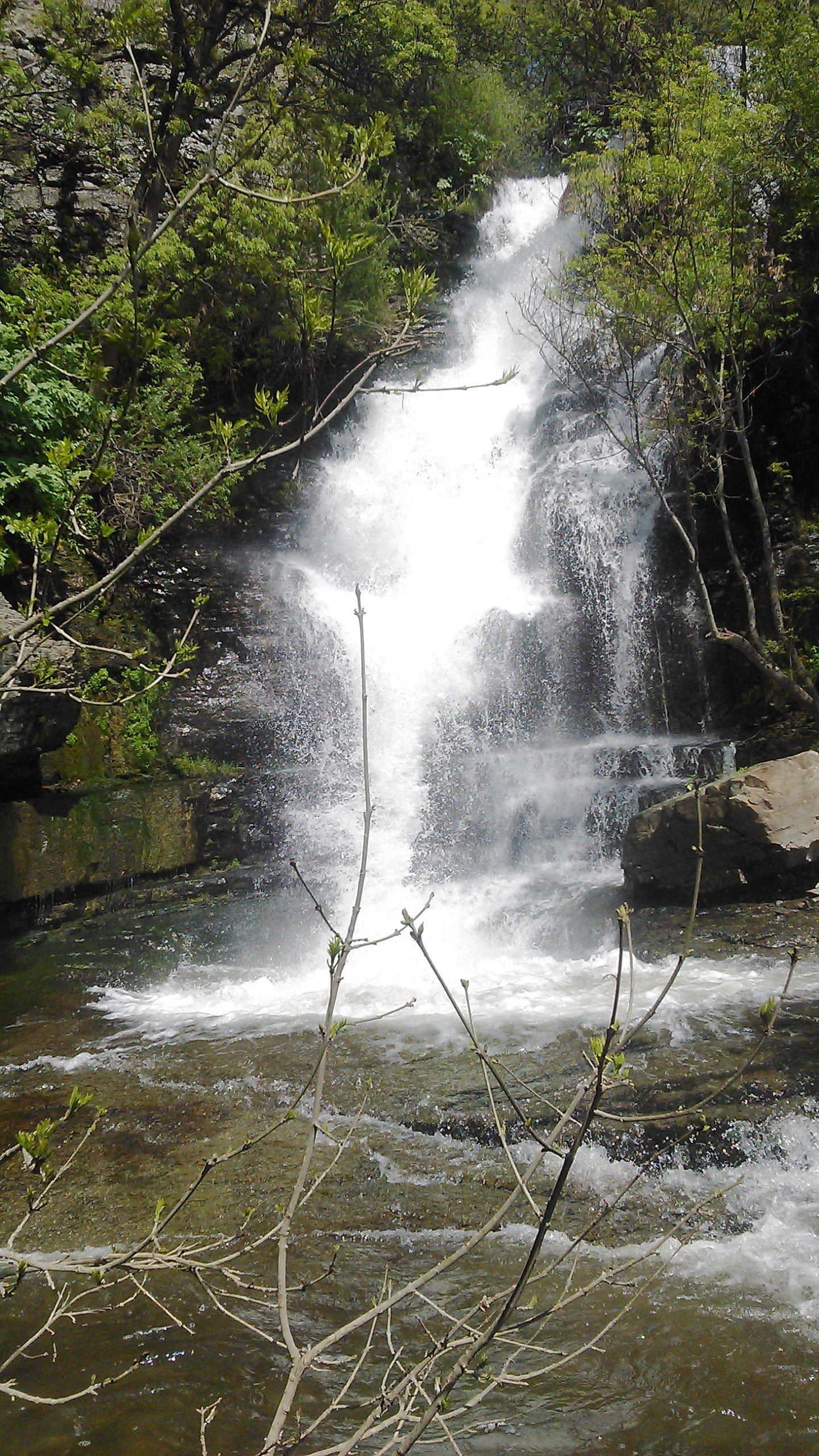
Astghik's Waterfall

The main rivers in the reserve are Azat and the Vedi.

Azat river length is 55 km (34 mi) and has a basin that occupies 572 square kilometers (221 sq mi). It is deep with relatively equal flow. It is full-flowing mainly in April and May and has a snow-rainy and underground mixed source.

Certain riverside parts of the river are sometimes frozen in winter. There are numerous little waterfalls on the tributaries of Azat river.

Vedi river starts from 2,700 m (8,900 ft) height. The river length is 58 km (36 mi), the decline is 1,910 m (6,270 ft), and watershed basin surface is 633 square kilometers (244 sq mi). The river flow has typical seasonal features, mostly with mixed sources. It is full-flowing in April and May.

The right tributaries of Vedi river are Khosrov, Mankuk rivers.

There is a large number of freshwater and mineral springs/sources, that are specified due to their regulated/stable regime, in the reserve.

== Climate ==
The climate of the reserve is quite diverse mainly due to ranging altitudes above sea level.

Dry continental climate covers the areas that are in the Ararat concavity foothill zone and are 900–1,300 m (3,000–4,300 ft) above sea level. Average annual precipitation here is 350–450 mm.

Winters are relatively mild (without stable snow cover every year). The average temperature in January is −4-5 °C. The lowest temperature reaches −25 °C.

Spring is short, relatively wet. Since the second decade of May the air temperature strongly increases above 15 °C and dry and hot summer begins.

Summer is long and often accompanied by drought conditions. Maximum temperatures are in July and August and reach up to 38 °C.Winds are typical for the second half of the day in summer months blowing from Geghama mountains.

Moderately warm, dry and temperate climate zone covers the territories the altitudes of which are ranging from 1,400 m (4,600 ft) to 200 m (660 ft) above sea level. Annual average rainfall/precipitations is 500–600mm, the numbers of non freezing days is about 200 days.

Stable snow cover is specific for winter months. The snow cover usually appears from mid-November and disappears in mid-March. The average temperature of January is −5-7 °C. According to long-term researches, the absolute minimum decreases till −30 °C.

Spring is long and full of precipitation. There is frequent night freezing.

Summer is relatively hot and dry, and is distinguished with prevailing sunny days. The maximum temperature is in July and August and reaches up to 34 °C.

Autumn is relatively warm. There is often rainfall during first decade of October, while during the first decade of November there is often snowfall.

Moderately cold climatic zone covers the territories the altitudes of which are from 2,000 m (6,600 ft) to 2,500 m (8,200 ft) above sea level. Annual average precipitation is up to 800 mm (31 in) and the number of non freezing days is about 90–120 days.

== Landscapes ==
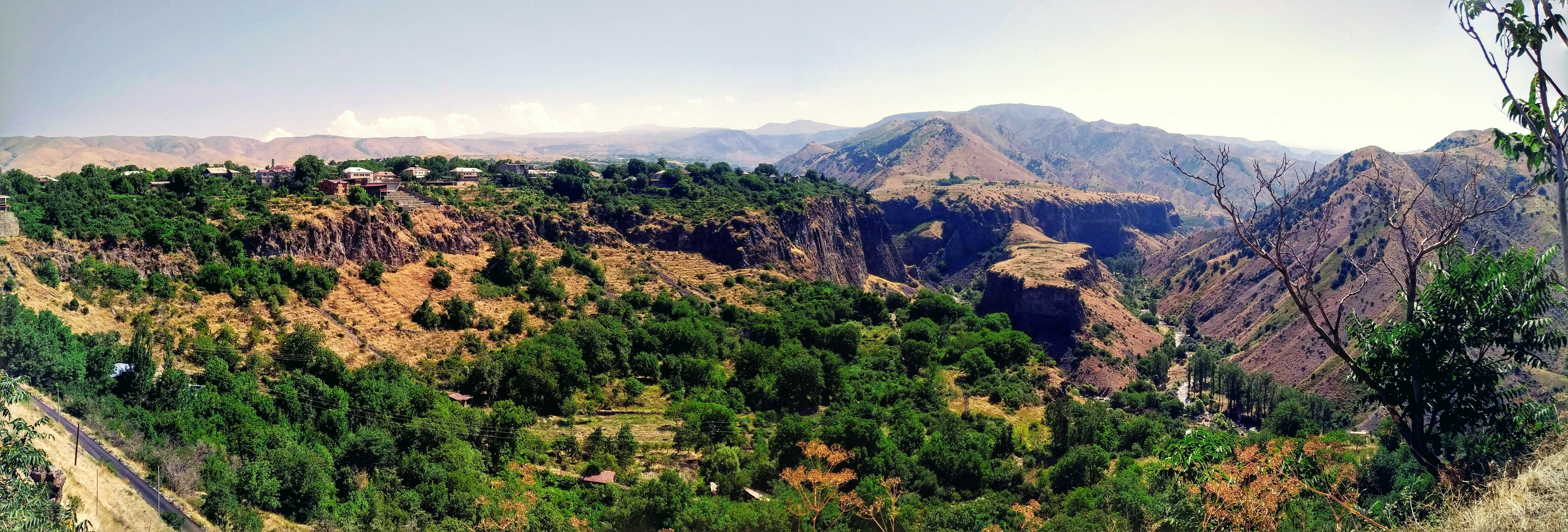
Panoramic view of Khosrov Forest

The landscape variety of Khosrov Forest State Reserve are due to the difficult mountainous relief, steep zoning and peculiarities of soil-climate conditions. They from landscape types from semi-desert to mountainous and alpine meadows.

True and sparse forests occupy 16 per cent of the reserve, open grasslands 20 per cent of the reserve, and rock-dwelling xerophilous communities cover 64 per cent of the reserve.

Semi-desert types of landscapes are spread at 900 to 1,250 m (2,950 to 4,100 ft) above sea level at the foot of the mountain ranges. Dry steppes occupy the middle sections of mountainous zone (at 1,250 to 2,500 m [4,100 to 8,200 ft] above sea level), where one can meet/find eastern oak forest from 1,600 m (5,200 ft), and juniper sparse forest at 1,500 to 2,100 m (4,900 to 6,900 ft) above sea level.

One can also find Euonymus europaeus, Sorbus aucuparia, and Lonicera caucasica in separate islets or with mixed symbioses.

Mountain-steppe and mountain-meadow landscapes are spread at 2,500 m (8,200 ft) above sea level in the reserve area; they are transferred into sub-alpine and alpine meadows in the high mountain zone.

== Flora ==
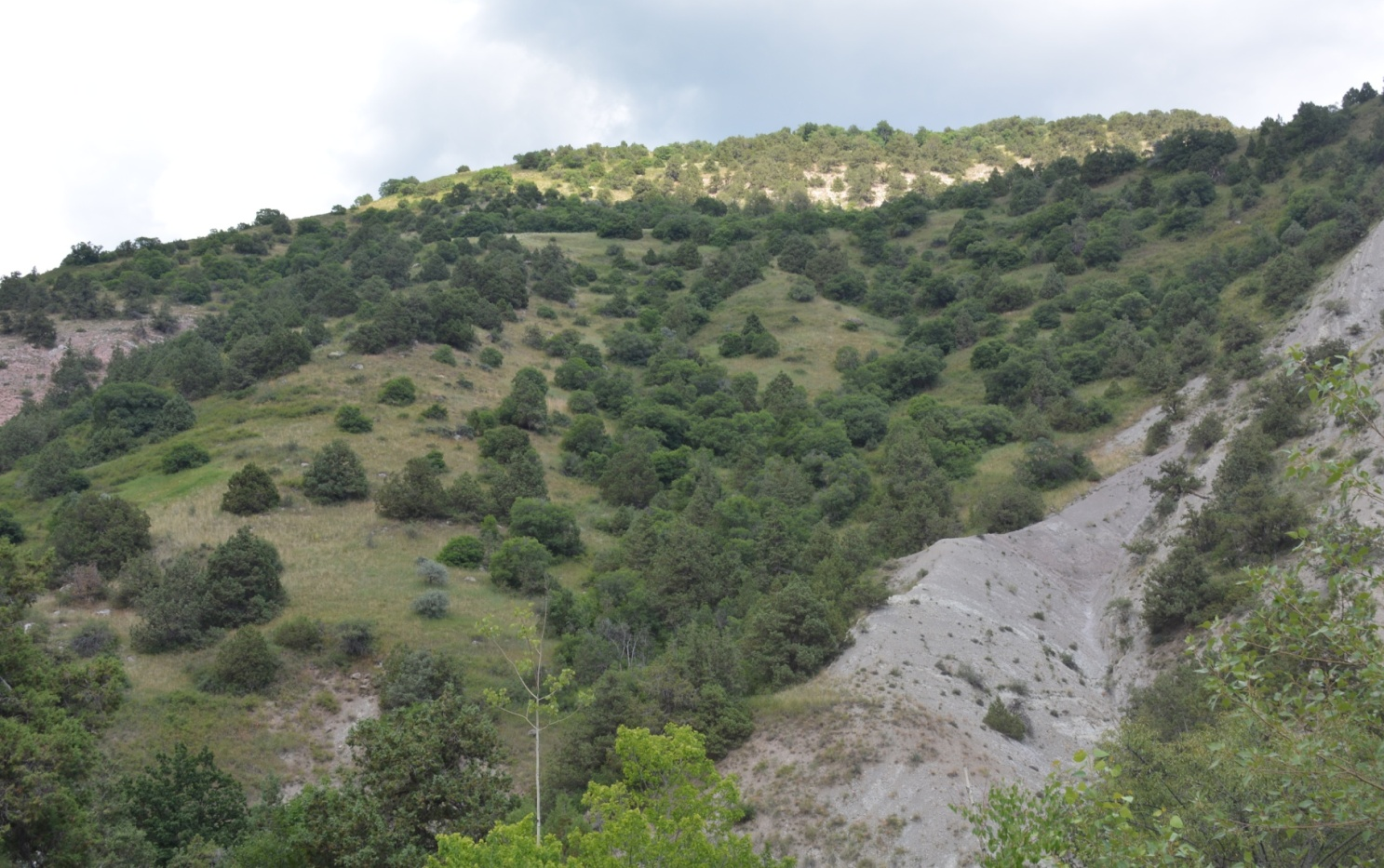
Juniper forest

On the territory of the reserve, making only 1% of the whole territory of Armenia, the flora numbers 1,849 species of high vascular plants from 588 genera and 107 families, which makes more than half of the flora of Armenia (more than 3,800 species total) and about one-third of the wealth of the Caucasus flora (about 6,000 species total). The rich flora are a mixture of endemic, rare and endangered species.

More than 80 species occurring on the reserve territory are registered in the Red Data Book of Armenia such as Adiantum capillus-veneris, Amberboa sosnovskyi, Centaurea erivanensis, Scorzonera szowitzii, Cicerbita persicus, Gypsophila aretioides, Minuartia sclerantha, Silene arenosa, Silene meyeri, Salsola tamamschjanae, Astragalus amblolepis, Astragalus basianicus, Astragalus lineatus, Crataegus pontica, as well as many species of pear. Out of 144 endemic species known from Armenia 24 occur in the reserve, including Aphanopleura trachysperma, Centaurea vavilovii, Cicerbita czerepanovii, Centaurea daralaghezica, Crambe armena, Astragalus holophyllus, Astragalus massalskyi, Pyrus theodorovi, Pyrus chosrovica and others.

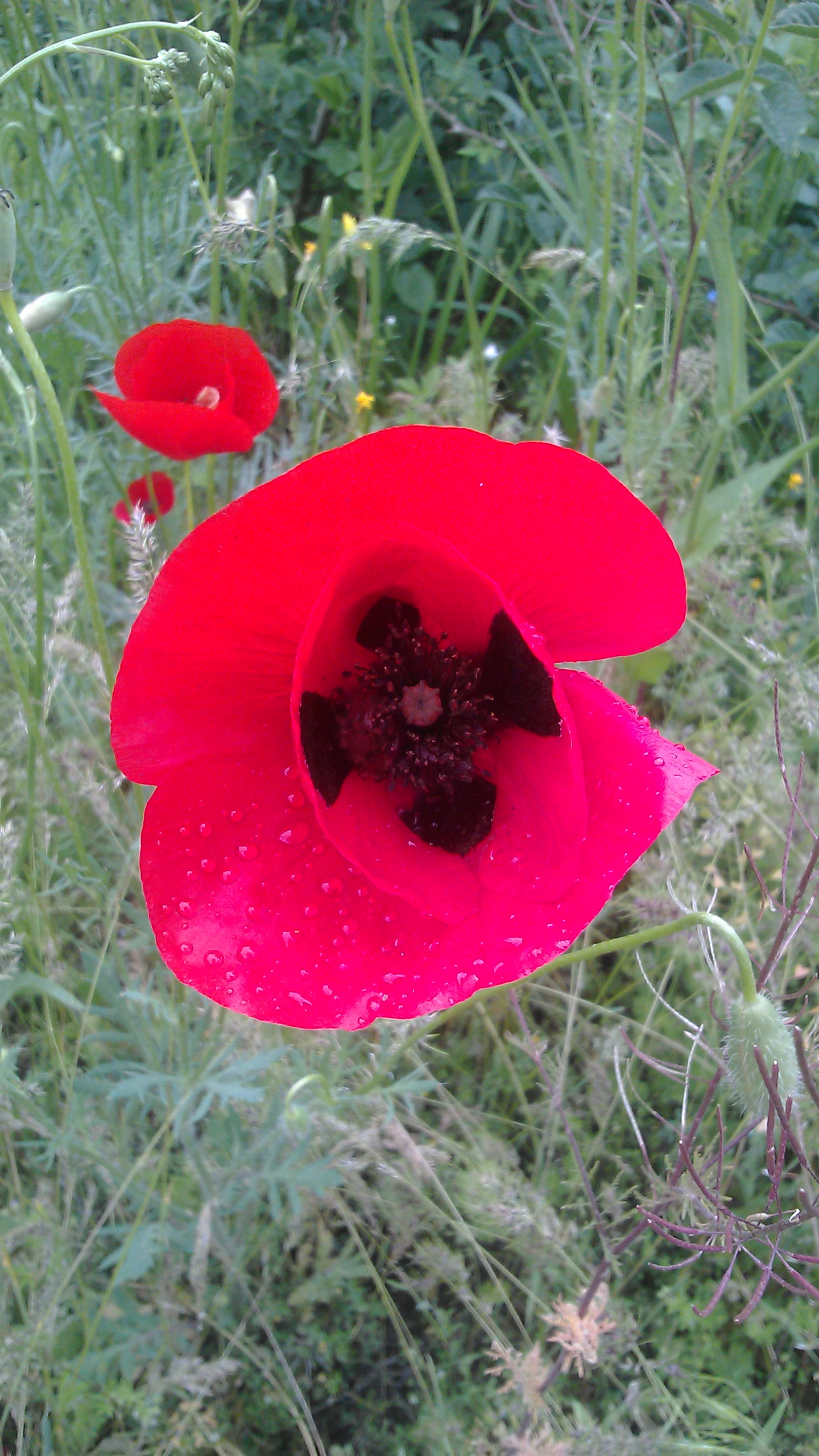
Poppy

On the foothills and low mountainous zone of Yeranos and Yerakh mountains adjacent to Ararat valley at the altitudes from 800 m (2,600 ft) to 1,200–1,300 m (3,900–4,300 ft) and sometimes up to 1,400 m (4,600 ft) the semi-desert: wormwood (Artemisia fragrans), saltwort (Salsola ericoides, Salsola dendroides), Centaurea erivanensis, Krascheninnikovia, Salvia, buckthorn, Atraphaxis, caper, Trifolium, Cousinia, mullein (Verbascum), poppy (Papaver) and other genera.

At the upper part of semi-desert zone there are rocky and stony slopes consisting of sedimentary limestone and chalky clay. These mountainous slopes, destroyed by wind erosion, are called "skeletal mountains". They are the habitat of dry Mediterranean type of vegetation, which is a gem of the reserve. The southern mountainous slopes covered by rocky massifs at the altitudes of 1,400–1,700 m (4,600–5,600 ft) are covered by Armenian Iranian phrygana (which means "dry" in Greek) with its many varieties.

This Mediterranean, more specifically typical Balkan type of vegetation is characterized as dry, short, deselly branched and often thorny bush association. In the reserve it consists of different species, such as Prunus fenzliana, cherry (Cerasus), buckthorn (Rhamnus pallasii), Spiraea and pear (Pyrus). Together with the mentioned main species sometimes the species hackberry (Celtis glabrata), mount Atlas mastic tree (Pistacia atlantica), Rhus (Rhus coriaria), Ephedra (Ephedraceae) and others occur. The bushes grow either alone or in groups, but never make homogeneous cover.

Mountain steppes, arid sparse forests and oak forests are represented in the middle mountain zone 1,400–2,200 m (4,600–7,200 ft) above sea level.

Tertiary relict juniper and oak forests are located in the forest zone, which are rather dense in Khosrov and Khachadzor districts of the reserve.

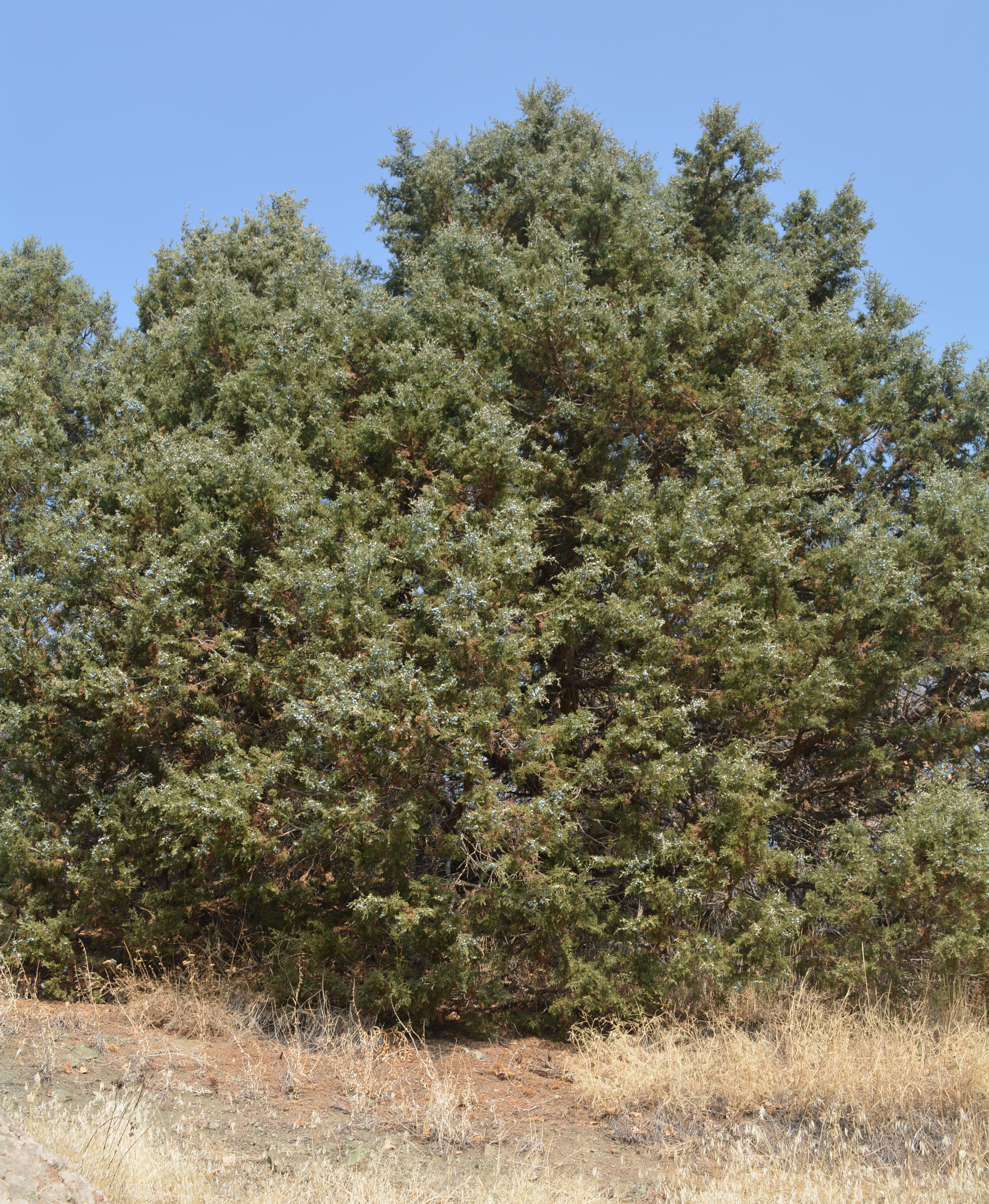
Juniper polycarpos

There are three species of juniper in the reserve: Juniperus communis, Juniperus polycarpos and Juniperus oblonga.

Juniper sparse forest occupy not big areas where Juniperus polycarpos dominate. Usually juniper is accompanied by Georgian maple (Acer ibericum), iguana hackberry (Celtis glabrata), Fenzl's almond (Prunus fenzliana), Rhamnus, Georgian honeysuckle (Lonicera iberica), wayfaring tree (Viburnum lantana), mastic tree (Pistaca atlantica), pear (Pyrus), rowan (Sorbus). The southern steep sunny and dry slopes are covered by juniper sparse forests.

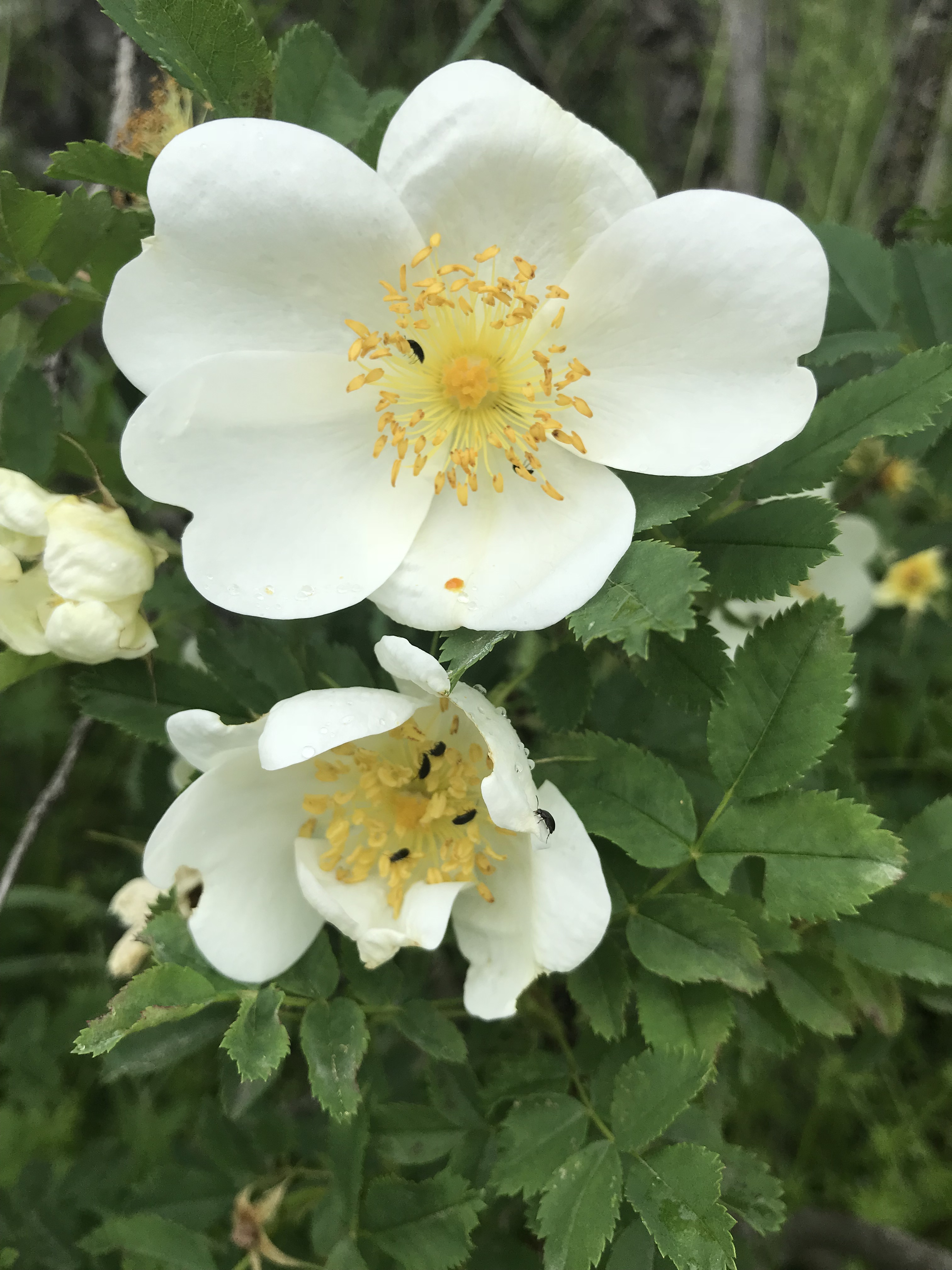
Rose

Caucasian oak (Quercus macranthera) forests can be found at an altitude of 1,600–2,300 m (5,200–7,500 ft) above sea level, which are rather dense in Khosrov district of the reserve known as "Trchnaberd". Oak forests are accompanied by ash (Fraxinus excelsior, Fraxinus rotundifolia), rowan (Sorbus aucuparia), pear (Pyrus), maple (Acer) and others. Bushes are abundant in the forests, represented by different species of wayfaring tree (Viburnum lantana), honeysuckle (Lonicera), rose (Rosa), hawthorn (Crataegus). The vegetation in the forests is rich in grass (family Poaceae L.).

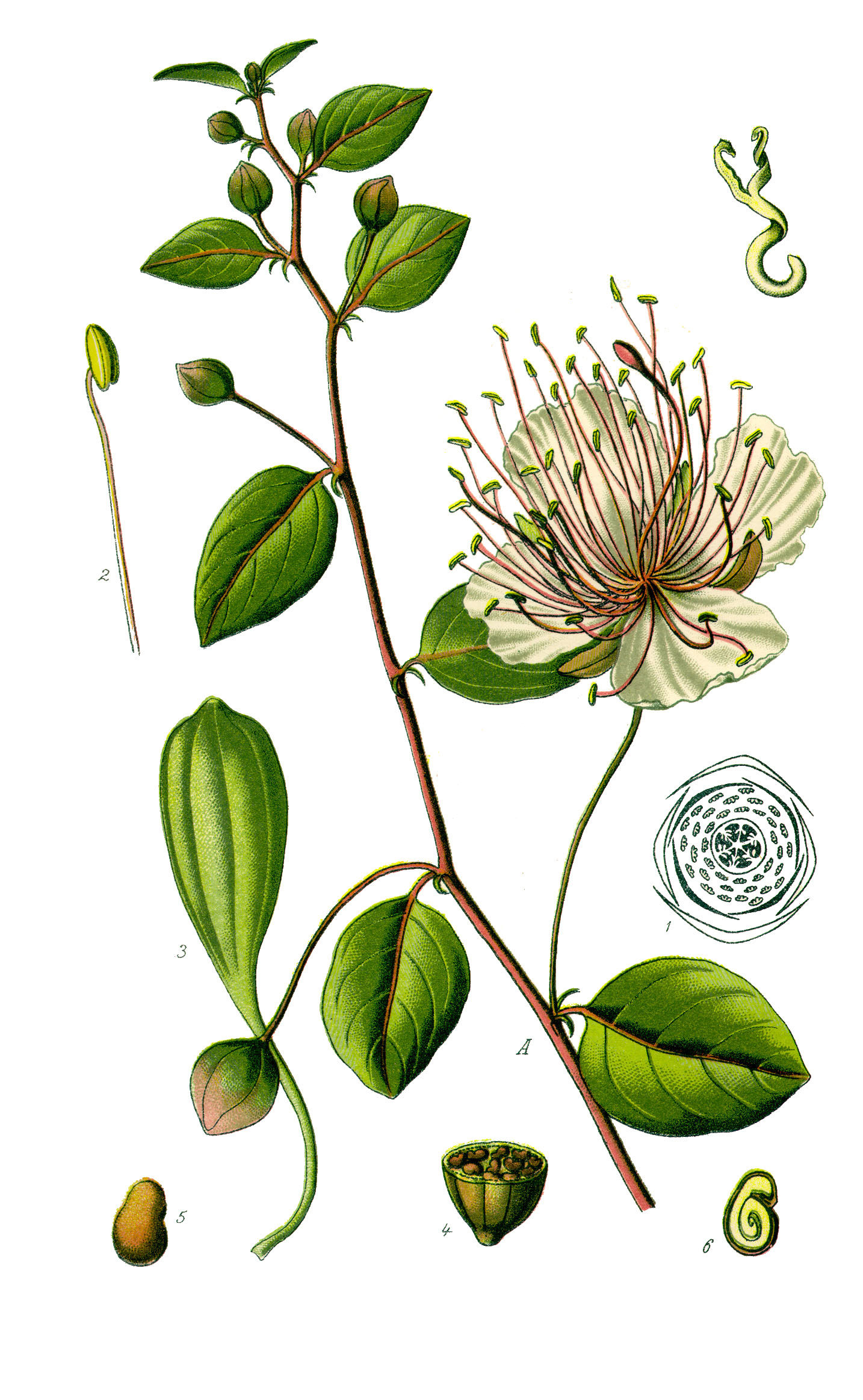
Capparis spinosa L. by Otto Wilhelm Thomé

Mountainous steppes are rather heterogenous with different formations named by the name of dominant plant species. Thus, in stipa steppe different species of Stipa (S. pulcherrima, S. capillata, S. tirsa) are dominant and in fescue steppe – different species of fescue (Festuca). In grass-forb steppe grasses (Poaceae) including species of junegrass (Koeleria), timothy (Phleum) and others dominate. In forb steppe other than Poaceae species, especially the species of catmint (Nepeta), alfalfa (Medicago), clover (Trifolium) and others dominate.

There are many polster plants in the reserve, which usually dominate in tragacanth steppes: milkvetch (Astragalus microcephalus, Astragalus lagurus), sainfoin (Onobrychis cornuta), prangos (Prangos ferulacea) and others.

Meadow vegetation covers the altitudes from 2,100–2,200 m (6,900–7,200 ft) up to 2,600–2,800 m (8,500–9,200 ft). In some places (upper streams of the rivers Mankuk and Khosrov) this vegetation is rather high and includes genera of different families with meadow species of family Poaceae such as timothy-grass (Phleum pratense), bulbous barley (Hordeum bulbosum) and others.

Tugai (desert, river valley) vegetation is distributed along the river banks where the following species grow: ash (Fraxinus), aspen (Populus), willow (Salix), Elaeagnus, tamarisk (Tamarix) and others.

== Fauna ==
The reserve is well known for its rich diversity of fauna.

There are over 1500 species of invertebrate fauna found at the reserve including 1427 species of insect, 62 species of molluscs and 3 species of scorpions. The representation of insects at the reserve are from the orders: Odonata, Mantoptera, Phasmatoptera, Orthoptera, Hemiptera, Coleoptera, Lepidoptera, Diptera and Hymenoptera.

Forty-four species of invertebrate animals are included in the Red Book of Animals of Armenia.

=== Insects ===
The insect fauna in the semi-desert zone is various and relatively rich with endemic species: Armenohelops armeniacus, Melitaea vedica Nekrutenko, Tomares romanovi, Sphenoptera geghardica Kalashian & Zykov, Cryptocephalus araxicola Khnzorian and others.

In the mountain steppe zone can be found these species: Sympecma paedisca, Cardiophorus pseudogramineus Mardjanian, Agapanthia korostelevi Danilevsky, Parnassius mnemosyne, Colias aurorina, Colias chlorocoma, Polyommatus huberti Carbonell, Polyommatus surakovi Dantchenko & Lukhtanov, Osmia cerinthides F. Morawitz, Bombus armeniacus Radoszkovski, Bombus niveatus Kriechbaumer.

In the forest zone can be found Papilio alexanor, Phengaris arion Jachontov, Hyles hippophaes, Proserpinus proserpina, Cerambyx cerdo Motschulsky and others.

=== Scorpions ===
Black or fattail scorpions are rare species, and one can find them only in Ararat valley till the elevation of 1,000 m (3,300 ft) above sea level. Yellow and multicolored scorpions go up till the elevation of 1,500–2,200 m (4,900–7,200 ft) above sea level and prefer light and well-conditioned soil.

=== Vertebrate animals ===
Vertebrate fauna numbers 283 species at the reserve. Out of them more than 58 are registered in the Red Data Book of Armenia and 51 in the IUCN Red List.

Mammals

There are 44 mammals species in the territory of the reserve. Mammals of the reserve are represented by Persian leopard (Panthera pardus ciscaucasica = P. p. saxicolor), Eurasian lynx (Lynx lynx), European wildcat (Felis sylvestris), brown bear (Ursus arctos), red fox (Vulpes vulpes), European badger (Meles meles), gray wolf (Canis lupus), least weasel (Mustela nivalis), European hare (Lepus europaeus), wild boar (Sus scrofa), wild goat (Capra aegagrus).

Persian leopard (Panthera pardus ciscaucasica = P. p. saxicolor) is registered in the Red Data Book of Armenia as well as in the IUCN Red list. The leopard is known as a careful animal with good vision, hearing and sense of smell. It is more active especially at night and morning hours.

The Eurasian lynx is the largest of the four lynx species, ranging in length from 80 to 130 cm (31 to 51 in) and standing 60–75 cm (24–30 in) at the shoulder. The tail measures 11 to 24.5 cm (4.3 to 9.6 in). Males usually weigh from 18 to 30 kg (40 to 66 lb) and females weigh 8 to 21 kg (18 to 46 lb).

The brown bear is the biggest predator of the reserve. Inhabits arid sparse forests, broadleaf forests, mountain grasslands, subalpine and alpine meadows. Availability of fruits, berries and nuts as the staple food items is an important factor of bear distribution. It feeds on fruits, berries, small animals as well as carrion. Pear, strawberry and especially honey are his favorite food. The brown bear is registered in the Red Data Book of Armenia, as well as in the IUCN Red List.

In the reserve there are favorable habitats (biotopes) for bezoar ibex. This animal inhabited the reserve through the ages. Numerous rock paintings on the territory of the reserve and bezoar goat ornaments of monuments from the Middle Ages are the evidence of its long lasting existence on the territory.

The bezoar goat got its name thanks to globular hard formations – bezoars, which are formed in its stomach on the basis of something hard in its food, for example, hair. In the past they were used in folk medicine. This animal is also called bearded goat as the males have a long beard. The males have also large sword-shaped horns with well expressed bulges in some place. These animals live in herds and feed on vegetable food. High mountainous rocky slopes divided by deep gorges, rock caves and mountainous terraces with bush vegetation are the favorite habitats of the bezoar goat.

The lifespan of a goat can be from 10 to 17 years. The bezoar goat is registered in the Red Data Book of Armenia, as well as in the IUCN Red List.

The wild cat is registered in the Red Data Book of Armenia, as well as in the IUCN Red List. Mating occurs in February and March. Three to eight, usually four or five, cubs are born in April and May.

Reptiles

In the reserve there are favorable habitats also for reptiles. There are 33 species of reptile in the reserve.

Caucasian agama (Paralaudakia caucasia), Azerbaijani lizard (Darevskia raddei), Nairi lizard (Darevskia nairensis), snake-eyed lizard (Ophisops elegans), Caucasus emerald lizard (Lacerta strigata), javelin sand boa (Eryx jaculus) and others species occur in the semi-desert zone.

Common slow worm (Anguis fragilis), golden grass mabuya (Trachylepis septemtaeniata), Schneider's skink (Eumeces schneiderii), European blind snake (Xerotyphlops vermicularis), collared dwarf racer (Eirenis collaris), dotted dwarf racer (Eirenis punctatolineatus), (Hydrophis schmidti), viper (Vipera spp.) can be found in the broadleaf and mixed forests.

Grass snake (Natrix natrix) and dice snake (Natrix tessellata) are not rare in water-swamp and river banks areas.

Medium lizard (Lacerta media), Transcaucasian ratsnake (Zamenis hohenackeri), Coluber ravergieri, coin-marked snake (Hemorrhois nummifer) and Elaphe sauromates occur on the rocky slopes of the mountain steppe zone.

Greek tortoise (Testudo graeca), Horvath's toadhead agama (Phrynocephalus horvathi), golden grass mabuya (Trachylepis septemtaeniata), Schneider's skink (Eumeces schneideri), Transcaucasian racerunner (Eremias pleskei), Transcaucasian rat snake (Zamenis hohenackeri ), Palestine kukri snake (Rhynchocalamus satunini), European cat snake (Telescopus fallax), Armenian steppe viper (Vipera eriwanensis), Armenian or Radde's viper (Montivipera raddei Boettger) is registered in the Red Data Book of Armenia.

The Armenian or Radde's viper (Montivipera raddei) is endemic to the Armenian Highlands. It inhabits arid forests, juniper sparse forests, mountain grasslands, stony slopes with sparse trees and scrubs at 1,300–1,800 m (4,300–5,900 ft), sometimes up to 2,500–2,700 m (8,200–8,900 ft) above sea level. It is active from early April to late October. Mating begins in mid–May and lasts until late June. The gestation period is 150–160 days. It is ovoviviparous. Hatchlings emerge from late August to late September.

The Armenian steppe viper (Vipera eriwanensis), is endemic to the Armenian Highlands. It is active from mid–April to mid–October and feeds on invertebrates and lizards. Mating occurs in April and May, depending on habitat elevations and time of hibernation end. It is ovoviviparous. The offspring are born from late July to mid–September. The gestation period is 90–130 days.

The Transcaucasian ratsnake (Zamenis hohenackeri) lives in rock crevices and juniper sparse forests. It reaches elevations c. 2,200 m (7,200 ft) above sea level. It comes out of hibernation from early to mid–April. It feeds on murids and lizards, and juveniles also eat insects. Eggs are laid in mid–June, 3–7 eggs/clutch. Hatchlings emerge in early September.

The spur-thighed tortoise (Testudo graeca) is active from April to mid–November. Hibernates usually in fox and badger dens. Feeds on succulent herbs and, to a lesser extent, on invertebrates. Mating occurs in April and May. Two to eight eggs are laid from June onward, three times a season, into the burrow dug in the ground. The incubation period is 2–3 months. Maturity is reached at 12–14 months.

Birds

There are 192 bird species of birds belonging to 44 families in the territory of the reserve. Birdlife in the reserve accounts for 56 percent of the avifauna in Armenia. Thirty-seven bird species found in the Khosrov reserve are included in the International Red Data Book and Red Data Book of Armenia.

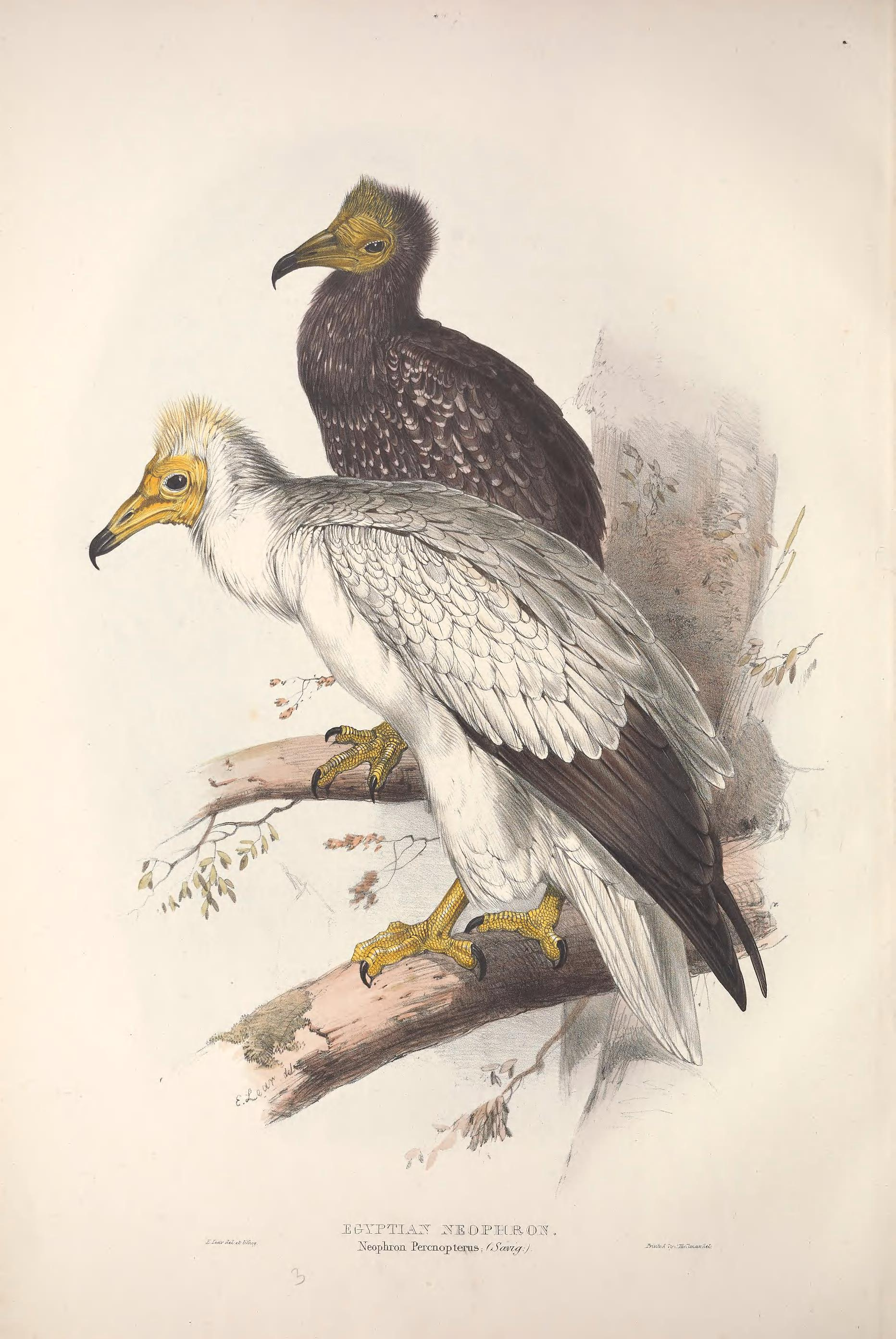
Immature Egyptian vulture (behind) and adult (from John Gould's Birds of Europe)

Predatory birds are the cinereous vulture (Aegypius monachus), lammergeier (Gypaetus barbatus Linnaeus), Egyptian vulture (Neophron percnopterus), griffon vulture (Gyps fulvus), pallid harrier (Circus macrourus), peregrine falcon (Falco peregrinus Tunstall), lanner falcon (Falco biarmicus Temminck), Eurasian goshawk (Accipiter gentilis) and others.

The cinereous vulture (Aegypius monachus) nests on the tops of juniper trees predominantly in Khosrov district of the reserve. The reserve is the only nesting place of cinereous vulture in Armenia. It is one of the two largest Old World vultures, attaining a maximum size of 14 kg (31 lb), 1.2 m (3.9 ft) long and 3 m (9.8 ft) across the wings. These predators as well as their relatives, feeding on carrion, perform "sanitary functions" in the nature.

From gallinaceous birds common quail (Coturnix coturnix), grey partridge (Perdix perdix), chukar partridge (Alectoris chukar), occur rather often and Caspian snowcock (Tetraogallus caspius) is less common.

Caspian snowcock (Tetraogallus caspius), known also as mountainous or wild snowcock, is a bird with a length of about 60 cm (24 in) and sometimes with the weight of up to 3 kg (6.6 lb). Thanks to strong legs (females have a spur) it walks and runs rather well. When in danger it flies with interrupting short flights down by slopes with the help of wide wingspread. It often runs sedentary lifestyle, feeds on plants and insect, prepares nest on the ground under bushes and stones. In the reserve it occurs on the upper forest timberline and adjacent meadows at the altitudes of 2,500 m (8,200 ft) and above.

Bimaculated lark (Melanocorypha bimaculata), larks (Alaudidae), pale rockfinch (Carpospiza brachydactyla), Mongolian finch (Bucanetes mongolicus), crimson-winged finch (Rhodopechys sanguineus), Finsch's wheatear (Oenanthe finschii), Kurdish wheatear (Oenanthe xanthoprymna), rufous-tailed scrub robin (Cercotrichas galactotes), Hippolais, Menetries's warbler (Curruca mystacea), little owl (Athene noctua), Eurasian hoopoe (Upupa epops), European bee-eater (Merops apiaster) occur in rocky biotopes of semi-desert, arid concaves.

The forest territories are inhabited by European honey buzzard (Pernis apivorus), black kite (Milvus migrans), short-toed snake eagle (Circaetus gallicus), Buteoninae, Eurasian sparrowhawk (Accipiter nisus), booted eagle (Hieraaetus pennatus), woodlark (Lullula arborea), ring ouzel (Turdus torquatus), red-fronted serin (Serinus pusillus), Radde's accentor (Prunella ocularis), common redstart (Phoenicurus phoenicurus), song thrush (Turdus philomelos), greenish warbler (Phylloscopus trochiloides), coal tit (Periparus ater), Eurasian blue tit (Parus coeruleus), hawfinch (Coccothraustes coccothraustes), magpie, European greenfinch (Chloris chloris) and others.

Common blackbird (Turdus merula), common whitethroat (Curruca communis), garden warbler (Sylvia borin), Eurasian wren (Troglodytes troglodytes) inhabit forest bush areas.

Siberian stonechat (Saxicola maurus), common linnet (Linaria cannabina), ortolan bunting (Emberiza hortulana), European turtle dove (Streptopelia turtur) and others are widespread in steppes.

Eurasian crag martin (Ptyonoprogne rupestris), alpine accentor (Prunella collaris), common rock thrush (Monticola saxatilis), western rock nuthatch (Sitta neumayer), white-winged snowfinch (Montifringilla nivalis), red-billed chough (Pyrrhocorax pyrrhocorax) and others inhabit high mountain zone.

Amphibians

There are five amphibian species in the territory of the reserve: Eurasian marsh frog (Pelophylax ridibundus), European green toad (Bufotes viridis), long-legged wood frog (Rana macrocnemis), Savigny's tree frog (Hyla savignyi), Syrian spadefoot (Pelobates syriacus). The Syrian spadefoot (Pelobates syriacus) is registered in the Red Data Book of Armenia.

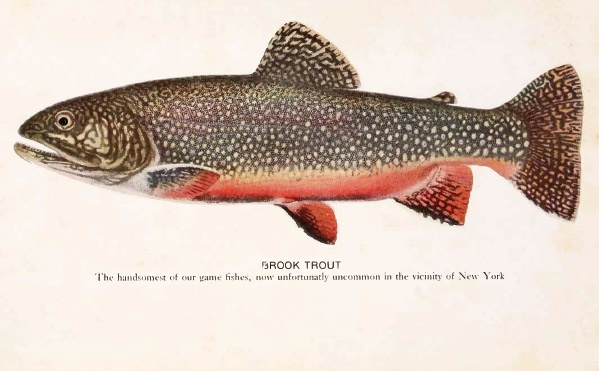
Drawing of a brook trout from John Treadwell Nichols's Fishes of the Vicinity of New York City (1918)

Fishes

The reserve is inhabited by nine species of fish which are the: brown trout (Salmo trutta fario), Transcaucasian barb (Capoeta capoeta), Kura barbel (Barbus cyri), Kura bleak (Alburnus filippi), North Caucasian bleak (Alburnus alburnus hohenackeri), spirlin (Alburnoides bipunctatus), golden spined loach (Sabanejewia aurata), Angora loach (Nemacheilus angorae) and Barbatula barbatula.

== Cultural heritage ==
Khosrov Forest State Reserve is the reserve of national and historic significance. Besides being the oldest preserved flora and fauna museum in Armenia, the next peculiarity of the reserve is its rich historical and cultural heritage. The cozy corners of the Khosrov Forest keep the first human cultural development imprints, engraved rock images, traces of ancient civilization, archaeological monuments and sites of historic and cultural great value.

The area is closely linked with the history of Armenian nation and glorious episodes of historical past starting from the periods of polytheistic pagan and Hellenistic culture. The reserve preserves ancient cultural amenities, historical-architectural monuments, unique plant and animal species, splendid diversity of scientific landscapes. In the historical past, the present territory of the reserve was included in Ayrarat State of Mets Hayk Kingdom. In the Middle Ages the state was one of the densely populated and lively areas. It was the area of central provinces Ayrarat and Syunik of Ancient Armenia (Great Hayq as per 7th century map), the residences of kings – capital Dvin and Artashat, the residence of Catholicosate (Havuts Tar) – the supreme patriarch of all Armenians, as well as the arena of historical events. It was also the place where famous personalities of religious and secular life, such as Grigor Lusavorich (240–326), Grigor Magistros (11th century), Gevorg Marzpetuni (10th century) and others lived and acted. The Silk Road passed through the reserve territory. The evidences of the historical past – preserved or partly destroyed remnants of secular and spiritual structures (fortresses, castles, churches, cross-stones, remnants of abandoned villages, grave-yards and others) together with the natural peculiarities of the area make Khosrov Forest reserve more famous and attractive. There are various ancient, natural monuments and other natural reserves located in and in the neighbourhood of the reserve for tourists and visitors to see and they are worth seeing. Among them include the: Aghjots Vank, Kakavaberd, Havuts Tar, Garni Gorge, Garni Temple and others.

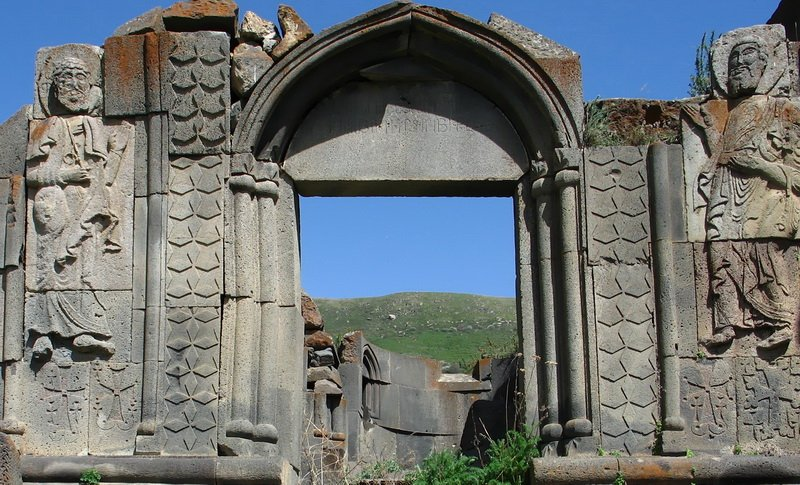
Aghjots Vank of the 13th century located within the Khosrov State Reserve

Totally 312 monuments are registered in the territory of Khosrov Forest State Reserve that are silent witnesses of the past.;

- 29 monasteries, churches, chapels
- 19 settlements
- castles
- 222 cross-stones and gravestones
- 40 other medieval monuments, which are mostly tumbled-down

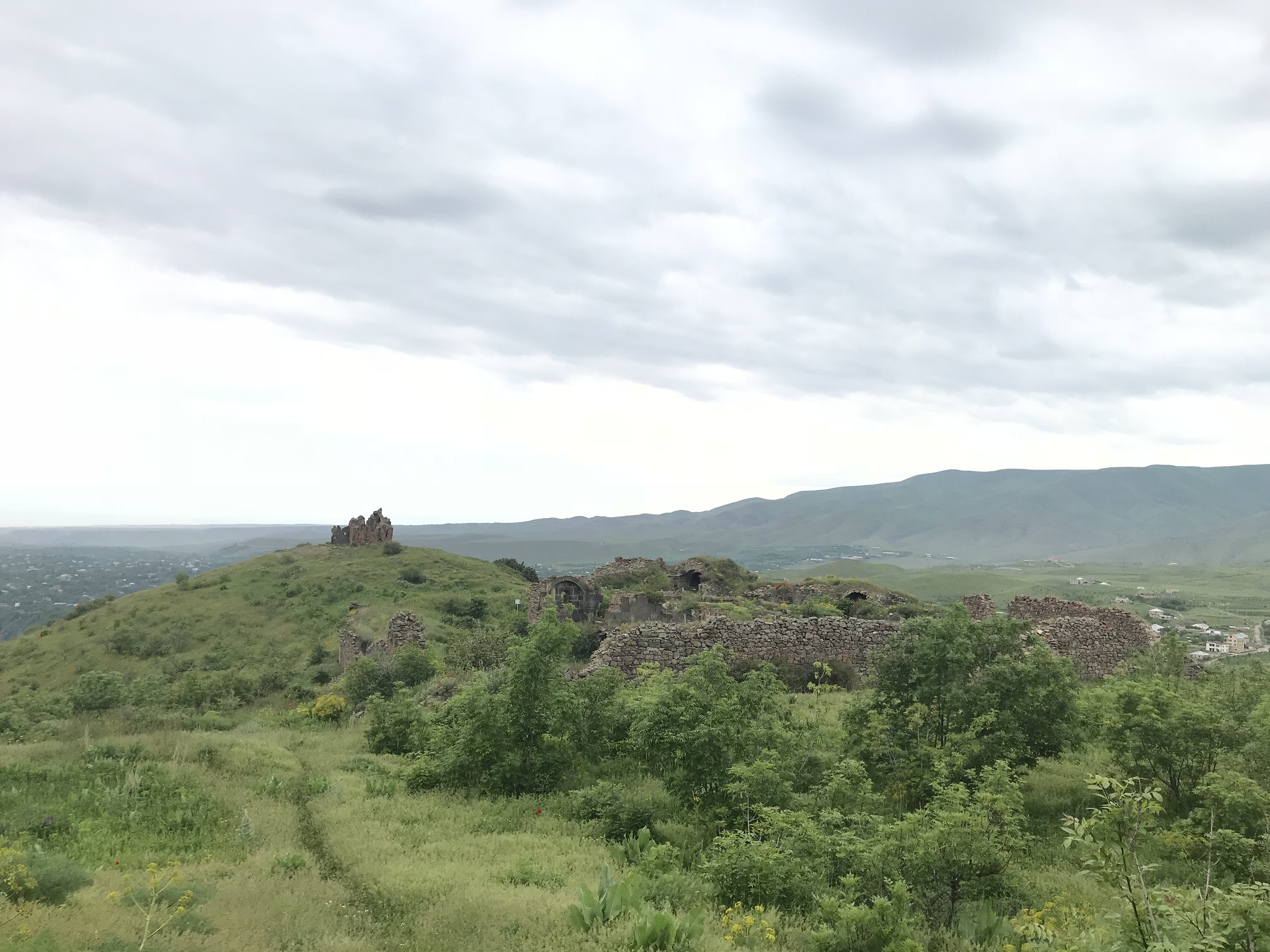
Havuts Tar Monastic complex

Havuts Tar Monastic complex monastic complex is located to the east from Garni, on top of the mountain that is on the left bank of Azat River. The monastic complex was one of the remarkable religious and cultural centers of Medieval Armenia. In 1013, Grigor Magistros constructed St. Amenaprkiche (St. Rescu) church in this complex referred to the Early Middle Ages. The rise of Havuts Tar was during the 12th-14th centuries and was destroyed by a big earthquake in 1679.

Astvatsatur catholicos renovated the monastery in the 18th century. Havuts Tar consists of two monument-groups located approximately one hundred meters far from one another. The main church (13th century) of the western monument-group is cross-shaped inside and rectangular outside and has prayer houses at 4 corners. It was constructed with diverse color scheme using reddish local tuff stone and the walls are rich of carved texts. The cupola and the roof are destroyed. In 1721, Astvatsatur catholicos began the construction of St. Karapet church, which was left unfinished due to the invasion of the Lezgins. According to a legend, the name of Havuts Tar, that means bird flight, is linked / connected to the Armenian priest who healed Lenk – Temur that attacked Armenia. For payment, he asked the invader to release as many prisoners as could enter the Church, and when the prisoners entered the church, the priest converted them into birds. The monastery has also the name of St. Rescue, as here was the remarkable holy crucifixion rescue cross-stone.

Havuts Tar was a cathedral, had its special diocese, which also included the city of Yerevan which means that the head of Havuts Tar at the same time was the head of Yerevan. Havuts Tar was a well-known center for manuscript creation, and the oldest known manuscript created here dates from 1214 AD.

After being badly damaged during the 1679's earthquake, some rebuilding works were done in the 20th century. Currently the monastery is in ruins.

Aghjots Vank

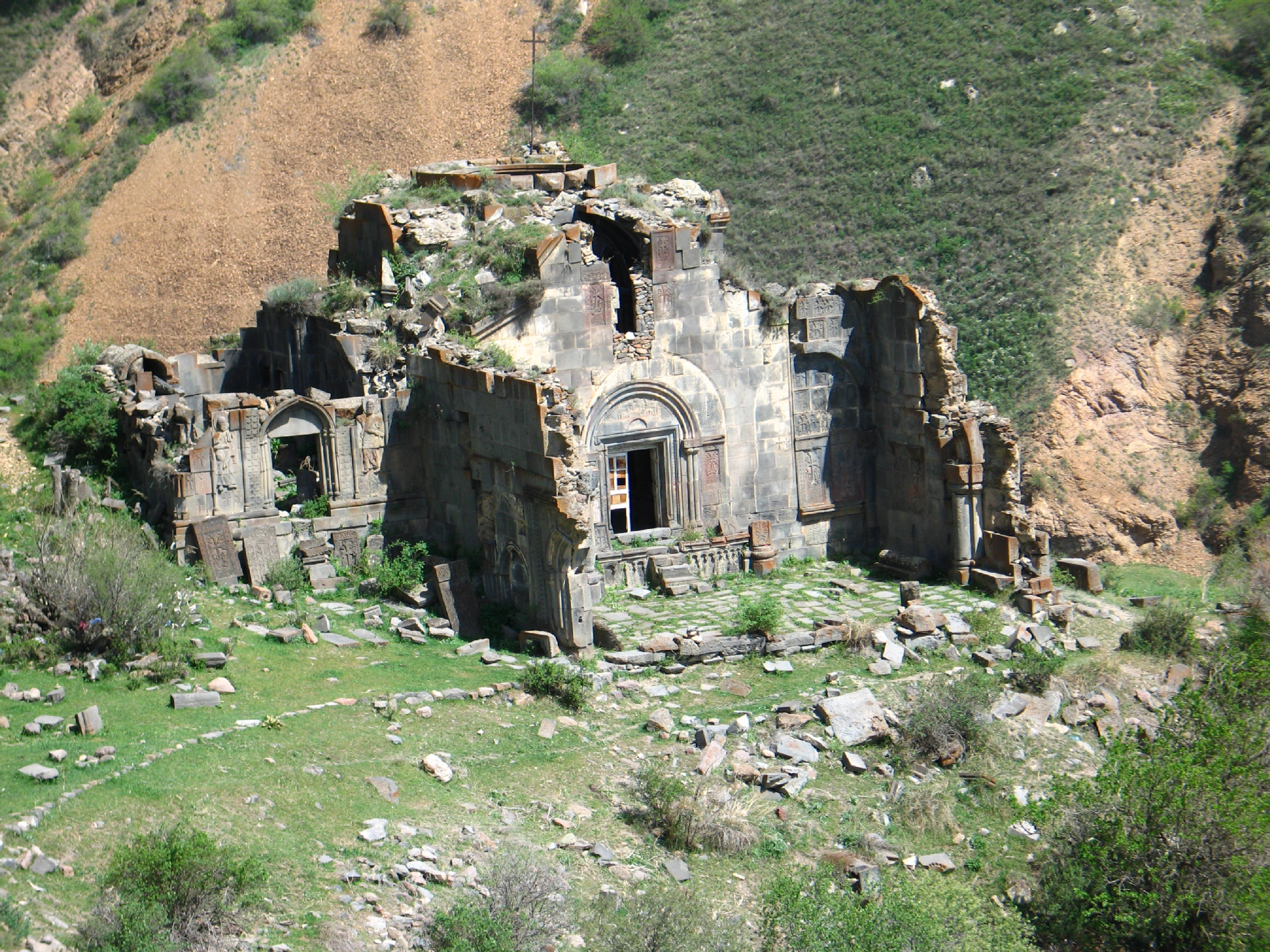
Aghjots monastery

Aghjots Vank is situated 7 km (4.3 mi) to the south from Geghard, on the mountain slope. According to legend in the beginning of the 4th century Grigor Lusavoritch (Illuminator) founded a monastery on the burial place of Stepanos priest who escaped from persecutions of King Trdat III, so why the other name of the church is Surb Stepanos. It was one of the important spiritual centers of medieval Armenia. There was also a nunnery.

The main church/Saint Stephanos/ was built in the beginning of the 13th century. It is a cupola-centered church with a cross-shape plan and prayer houses at 4 corners.

A church porch/parvis was built on the western side of the church in the second half of the 13th century. Its roof is leaned against a pair of crossing arches.

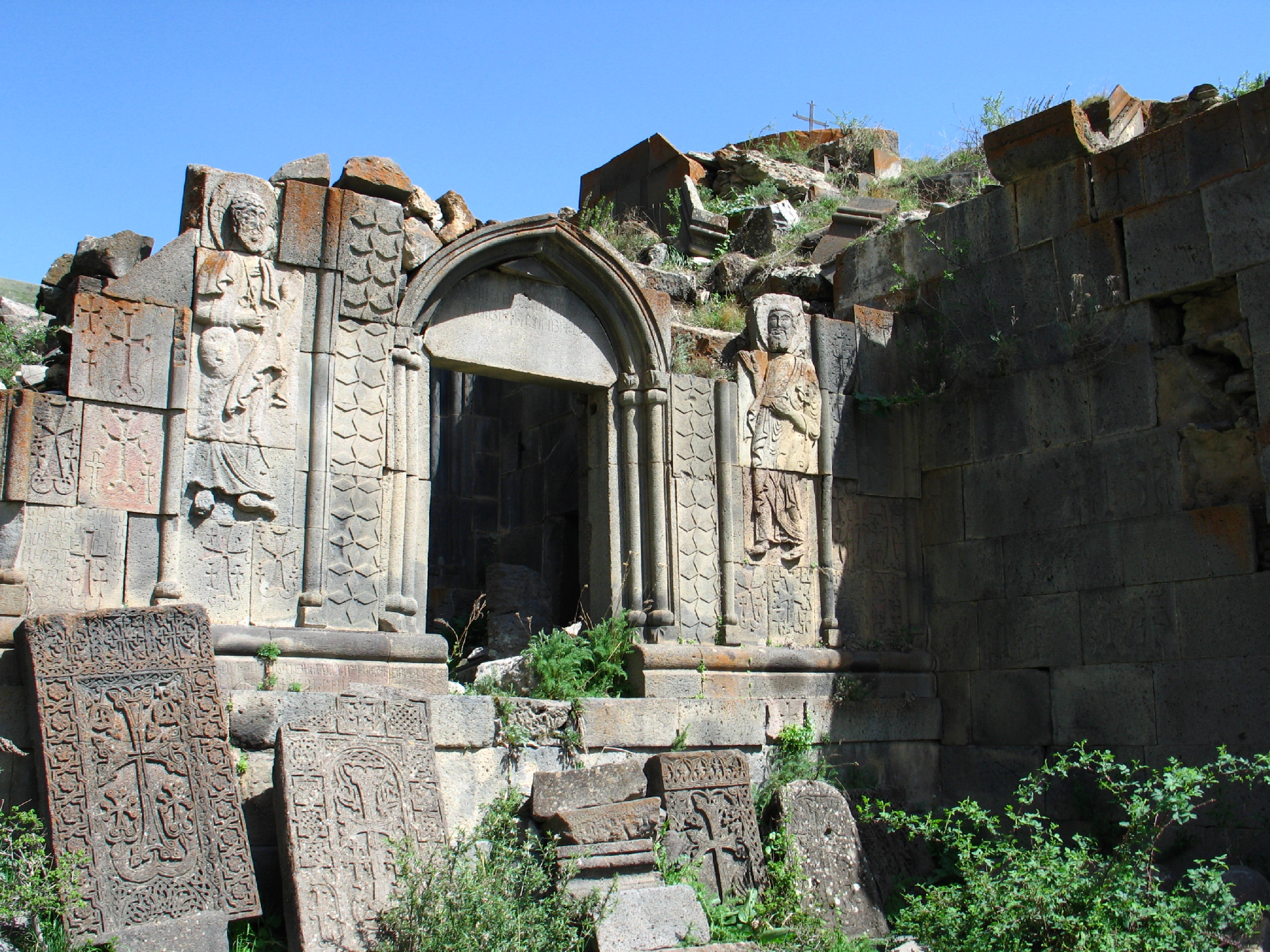
Surb Poghos-Petros

In 1270 Jeremiah abbot with the help of Vasak Khaghbakyan built St. Paul and Peter Church (Surb Poghos-Petros) on the northern side of St. Stepanos church. It is a one-nave felt basilic cupola-centered church and has three prayer houses.

The sculptures of apostles Peter and Paul on both sides of the church entrance are remarkable.

Aghjots monastery was surrounded by grey-blue basalt wall. There were oil mill, guest house, dwelling and consumer buildings, gardens and properties. There are cemetery ruins with a number of cross-stones and gravestones near the church. There are image sculptures on Old and New Testament themes in the monastic complex. An episode from Dreadful judgment sculptured/carved on the western front of S. Stephanos church.

Aghjots monastery served not only as a religious/spiritual but also educational center. Famous/well known medieval historian and pedagogue Vardan Areveltsi /Vardan Gandzaketsi/ founded a school here in the second half of the 13th century.

Aghjots monastery were repeatedly subject to robbery and devastation (during Persian shah Shah Abbasʼraid/1603-1605/;big earthquake/1679/; the last raids of the Lezgins and conflicts between Christians and Muslims held in the region/1905-1906/.

Some walls of the church porch/parvis are preserved.

Geghmahovit

It is located at the confluence of Azat river and Aghjo and Glan tributaries. A pentahedral church with a basilic structure is built from hewn ballast in the village center. It has a felt cover. Separate parts of cornice are preserved.

There are no preserved historical data on the foundation of the church of Geghmahovit village, though the architectural analyses show that it was constructed in the 5th-6th centuries. While studying the monument a record stone was found, the carved record is in Greek and with inverted letters so that it can be read with the help of mirror. The Armenian translation of the record is "Health" and "Bliss". Decorated caps and frescoes are preserved, in the center of which equal-winged crosses are engraved. The church is considered as the best samples/models of early medieval architecture.

Poqr Shen (Avanik )

The abandoned village Avanik or Poqr Shen is located on the plateau on the right side of the Eiver Azat. In the eastern part of Avanik there is a destroyed church, which according to historic-architectural analysis was built in the 6–7 ^{th} centuries. There is a spiritual monument with carved crosses in the western part of the church and cross-stones dated to the 9–10 centuries-beneath the southern wall. In Avanik there are also destroyed remnants of numerous square and rectangular dwelling constructions, a spring constructed in the north-eastern part and gravestones of a graveyard in the southern part of the village.

Kakavaberd

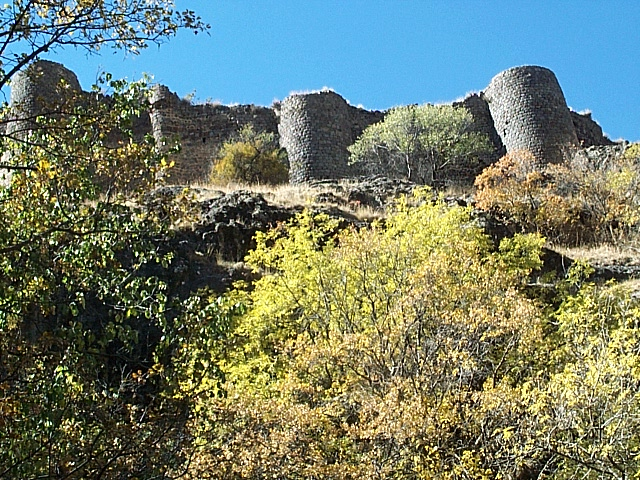
Kakavaberd

Kakavaberd / Geghayo, Keghayo, Geghi, Keghi fortress, Tatul fortress / are brilliant fort-construction models of historical Armenia. It is located 12 km to the south-east from Garni, on the right bank of Azat river. The fortress now exists and is quite well preserved. It is inaccessible from three sides as it was surrounded by natural gulfs (abysses / precipices) and huge rocks. The forth side is fenced / enclosed as it was not protected by natural barriers. The walls / fences prolonged to the north-east have 2–2.5 meters thickness, near the gate the thickness is 2.60 m. The height of the walls is 8.15 m. The northern towers are eight and their height is more than 10 meters. There are anterooms at the bottom of some towers, as well as there is a round room and small windows inside some of the towers. There is a chapel dug / carved out of the rock with a cross carved on the front at the entrance near the gate of the fortress. The citadel is situated on the western side of the fortress. There are noticeable building ruins, too. The fortress took the name "Kakavaberd" as there are numerous partridges / willow ptarmigans thereabout; the original name was "Geghama Monastery" after the name of the highland. Kakavaberd is also called Tatul fortress, as it is very similar to Tmogvi in Javakheti. Hovhannes Draskhanakerttsi (9–10 centuries) was the first to mention about the fortress during the description of the retreat of Arab general / military leader Bsheri who was defeated during the sea battle in Sevan by Ashot Erkat /Iron/ Bagratuni. In the 11th century the fort was owned by the Pahlavunis and in the 12–13th centuries the Proshyans were the rulers here. Later on, Stephanos Orbelyan left a written memoire about the fort giving Geghi name to the fort where he described the battle held near Garni village/city in 1225. There is no precise data on the foundation and destruction of Kakavaberd fort. It was probably destroyed in 1679 from the earthquake after which it was not reconstructed.

Berdatak

It is located in a valley of Azat river to the south-east from Geghmahovit village. It existed until the 1950s. Berdatak old settlement ruins are in Kaqavadzor, at the foot of the rock where we can find the medieval significant fort Kaqavaberd. Probably the name Berdatak derived from here. The uninhabited village was inhabited in the 17th—18th centuries. Most probably after the powerful earthquake in 1679. A wonderful panorama from Berdatak opens to Hazaradzor, Kaqavaberd cliffs and Kajaru canyon/gorge.

Khosrov uninhabited village

The uninhabited village is situated on the right bank of Khosrov river. It was inhabited until the 1940s. There are no preserved written data on the foundation of Khosrov uninhabited village and only the existence of historical monuments can prove its antiquity.

The 12th to 16th centuries were flourishing for the village. There one can find the remained church ruins (13th century), cemetery (12th to 16th centuries) and chapel dug/carved out of the rock (11th to 13th centuries).

Khosrov uninhabited village and the cupola-centered church with a single entrance were probably constructed/founded in the 12th century. One can see a massif (a fort of birds) situated at the altitude of 2,000–2,100 m (6,600–6,900 ft). above sea level from the old uninhabited village territory. It is the favorite habitat for predatory birds.

Mankuk uninhabited village

This ancient site is located on the upper part of Mankuk river valley. The land route goes up from Jghon, cuts the forest spread on the mountain brush slopes of Khach and again goes down to Mankuk river valley where two uninhabited village are located. Till the 14th century the Mamikoneansʼ generations had estates in Mankuk, where the Mamikoneansʼ mausoleum, family cemetery with more than a dozen of wonderful decorated cross-stones and the carved gravestones-cross-stones of Toros, Grigor and Mariam Mamikoneans were preserved.

Old broad cemetery is located on the eastern highland of the village ruins with many delicately carved khachkars/cross-stones. The most part of the cross-stones are mass with rich and stable records.

Here one can find a semi-damaged delicately carved cross-stone of the 10th–11th centuries where "Sakraberd" name is noted on one of its carved records.

Sakraberd

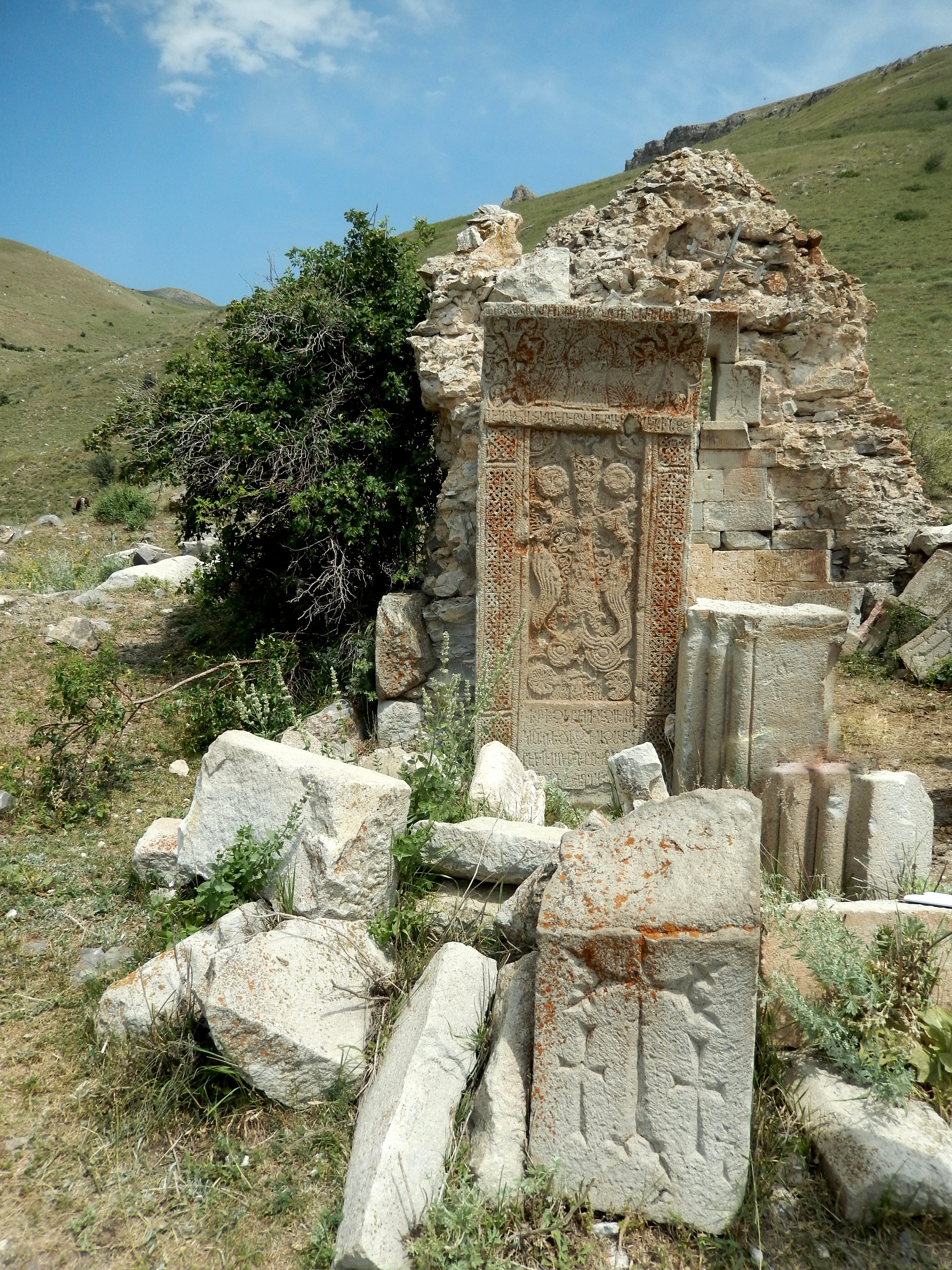
Spitak vank

There are records since early Middle Ages that mention about Sakraberd, one of the centers of rulers residence of Urtseats ministry. It is one of the ancient and significant forts of Ayrarat state. Ghazaros Parpetsi mentioned/recorded about this fort. Sakraberd is mentioned in Haysmavurk written in 1492. Here Sakraberd village is mentioned with Sp. Stepanos church that was possibly located near the fort. The village was named after the name of the fort. Sakraberd was abandoned after the deportation in 1604.

Sakraberd is located on the left bank of Khosrov river, on the high rocky mountain top. The fort was constructed on a small mountain plain. At the foot of the mountain one can find a homonymic uninhabited village with various dwelling and household buildings, and a large cemetery ruins rich with cross-stones.

Spitak vank

It is an uninhabited village of the 10–14th centuries that is located on the right bank of Mankuk river, the tributary of Vedi river. It was abandoned in 1950.

== Pressures on the reserve ==
The landscape in the reserve has had its fair share of pressures from human development and interference since the 4th century. Originally the main threats to the reserve were hunting of animals and clearing of trees. Prior to 2007 disease had significantly damaged the juniper trees and other dry climate trees in the reserve. Juniper is a very valuable tree as its resin is used in aviation equipment, its wood is used in furniture making and has bactericide properties. Illegally logging and poaching had occurred in the late 1980s to the early 1990s which saw the number of animals had halved in those years. In recent years the conditions for the fauna have improved and the wildlife number's had increased favourably due to climate conditions and proper budget conservation measures.

At present several villages are located inside the reserve and many rural communities near the reserve. In 1985 a number of agricultural lands were taken from their owners to be incorporated into the reserve and land grants were compensated elsewhere. Now 40 households use 20 hectares (49 acres) of ranges inside the reserve and to an extent overlap between the reserve and land-use boundaries allows locals to violate the legal protection of the reserve. An example of this, is the Gorovan Sands Sanctuary which near the reserve is known to be Armenia's only protected true desert reserve has been exploited from sand mining and livestock grazing.

== See also ==
- List of protected areas of Armenia

== Sources ==
- “Khosrov“ state reserve is awarded with the European diploma, 4 April 2012
- Discover Armenia – Khosrov Forest State Reserve
- Ginosi.com – Khosrov Forest State Preserve
- Find Armenia: Khosrov forest (Khosrov reserve) Ararat
- Keeping Khosrov: Nature preserve maintains small part of Armenia nature–fravahr.org, 27 October 2007
- Ptolemaic Genealogy: Affiliated Lines – Descendant Lines, Lineage of Khosrov
