= Kakavaberd =

Fortress in Ararat Province, Armenia

Kakavaberd Կաքավաբերդ
- Ararat Province, Armenia
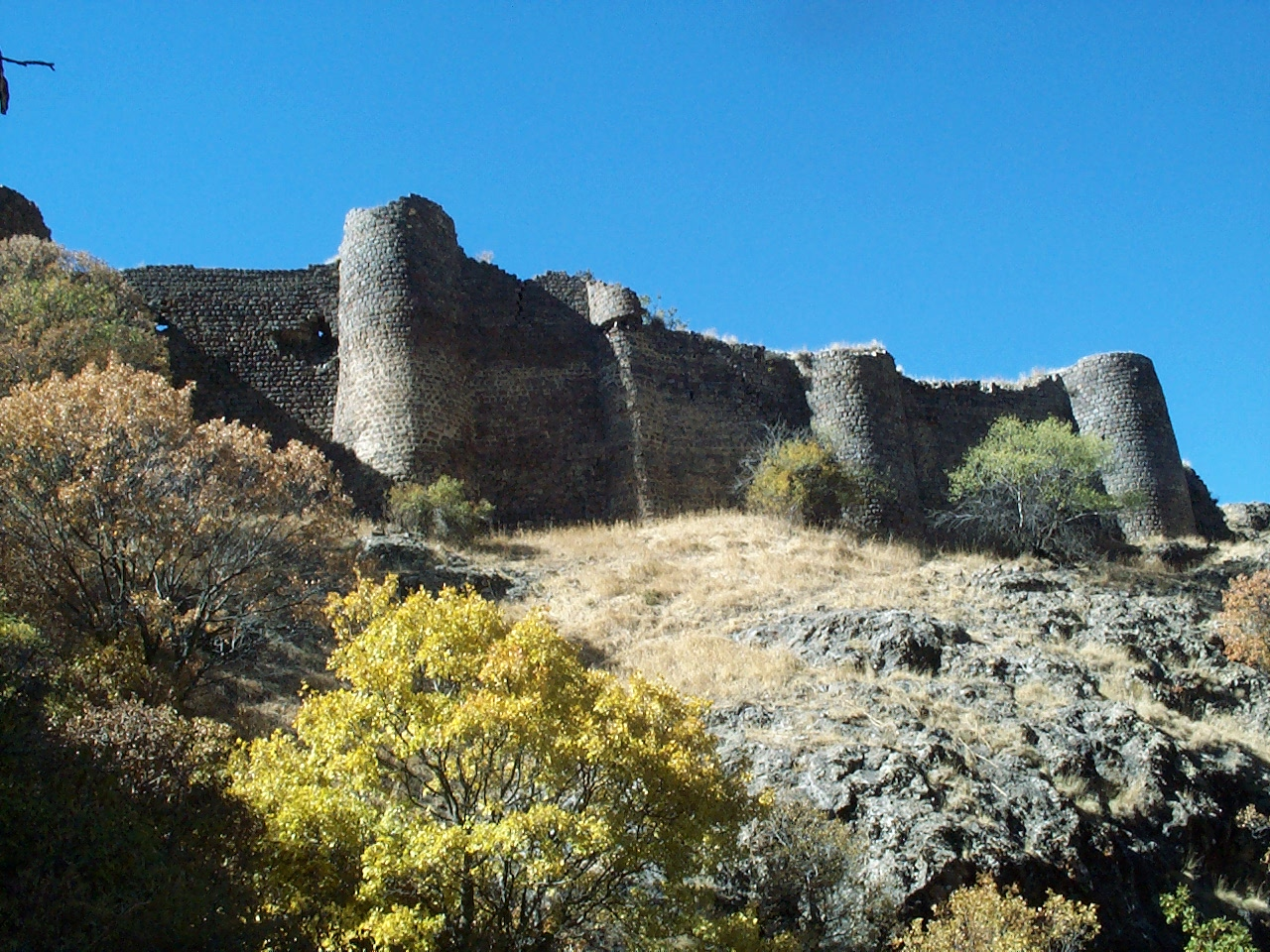
- The Fortress of Kakavaberd.

Site information
- Type: Fortress
- Open to the public: No. One must ask permission to enter the reserve.
- Condition: Large sections of fortification walls are well preserved.

Location
- Shown within Armenia
- Location within Armenia Location within Ararat
- Coordinates: 40.1140778°N 44.7293361°E

Site history
- Built: 4th century?, first mentioned in the 9th-10th centuries.

Kakavaberd or Kaqavaberd (Armenian: Կաքավաբերդ, Eastern Armenian Kak'avaberd), also known as Geghi Berd, Keghi Berd or Kegh (Գեղի բերդ Gełi Berd), is a fortress on a ridge overlooking the Azat River gorge at Khosrov Forest State Reserve in Ararat Province, Armenia. Kakavaberd is 1,516 metres (4,974 ft) above sea level.

== Site ==
The fortified walls of Kakavaberd are well preserved and crown a ridge within the Khosrov State Reserve. It is inaccessible from three of its sides because of the steep terrain. Towers at the northeastern side are 8 to 10 metres (26 to 33 ft) tall. Within the fortress are the ruins of a church and other structures.

== History ==
The fortress was first mentioned by Hovhannes Draskhanakerttsi (John V the Historian) in the 9th-10th centuries in his History of Armenia as being controlled by the Armenian noble Bagratuni family. He wrote that in 924, after losing a battle at the island of Sevan, the commander and chief Beshir went on to attack the fortress of Kakavaberd. He was later beaten by Gevorg Marzpetuni. The same event is recorded in the book "Armenia and the Armenians" (1874) by James Issaverdens where he writes,

Beshir enraged at this failure of his expedition, marched against the fortress of Kegh, on which he determined to wreak his vengeance. But George the Marzbedunian was there with his few followers, he therefore sallied out and made a gallant charge upon Beshir's troops, marking his progress by heaps of slain. Beshir had his horse's legs broken; he, however with difficulty effected his escape, followed by his troops. But George's followers also were so much reduced, that they were obliged to discontinue their exertions. Upon which the inhabitants of Kegh and other fortresses, being afraid of Beshir's future operations, left them and took refuge in other places. Beshir on hearing this, took possession of them.

In the 11th century it passed over to the Pahlavuni family, and in the 12th–13th century to the Proshyan family for whom the nearby town is named. Kakavaberd was last mentioned in the year 1224 when after losing a battle that took place near Garni, Ivane Mkhargrdzeli found shelter there.

Muratsan has also mentioned the fortress in Gevorg Marzpetuni (1896), a historical novel set in Armenia in the 10th century.

== Gallery ==
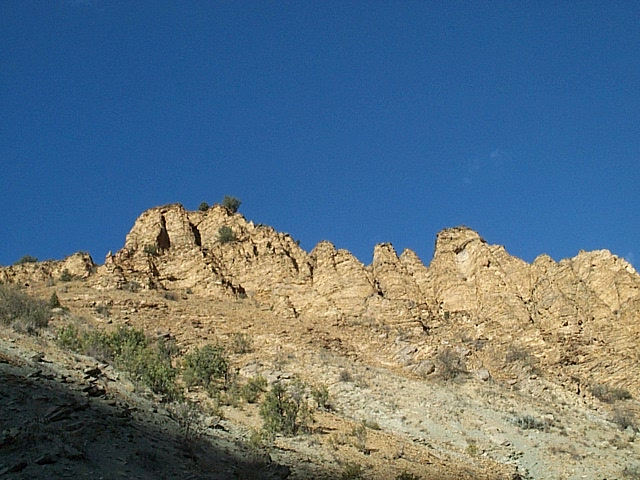

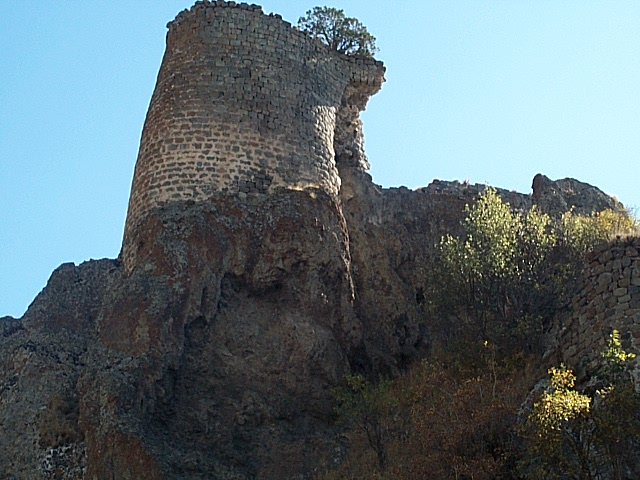

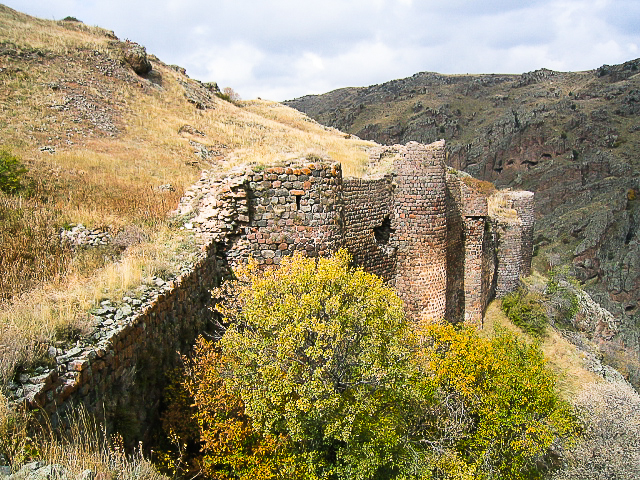

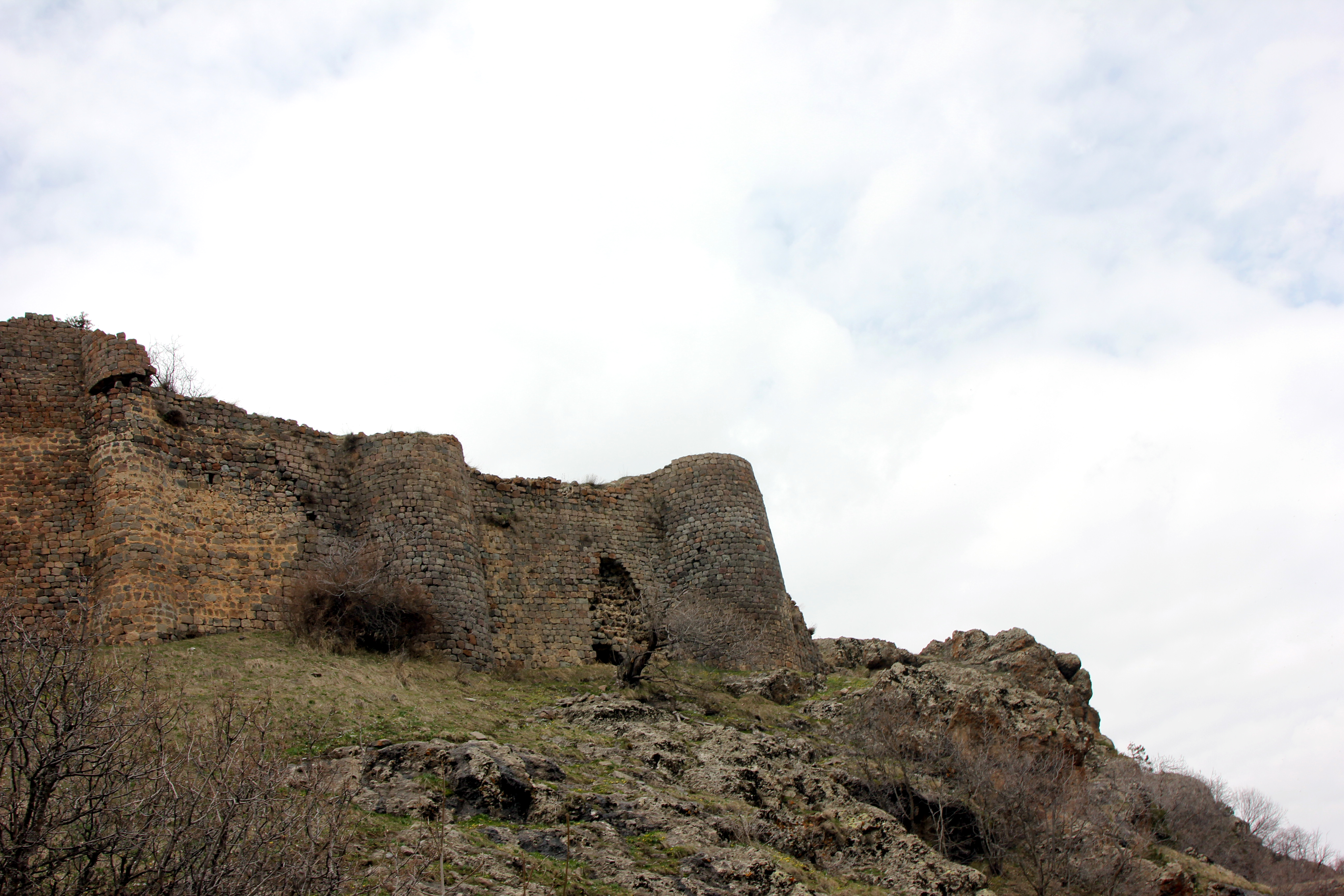

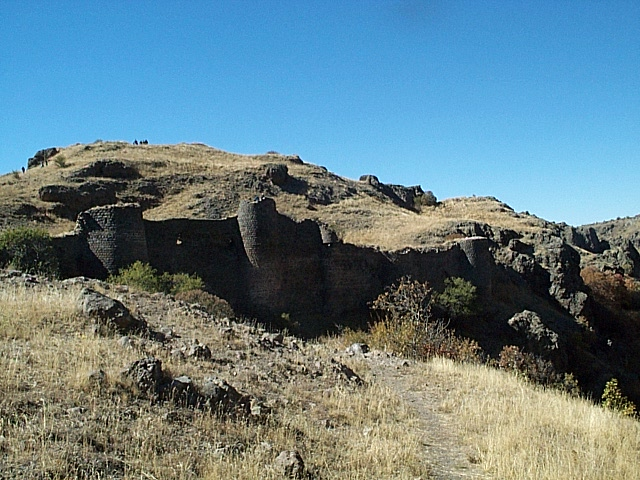

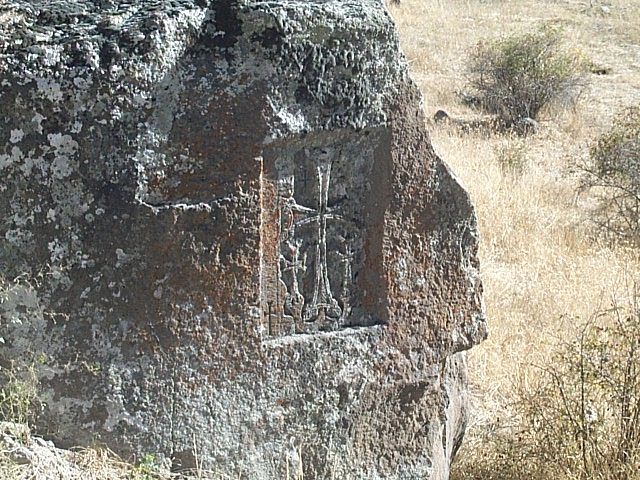
