= Astragalus lineatus =

Scientific classification
- Kingdom: Plantae
- Clade: Tracheophytes
- Clade: Angiosperms
- Clade: Eudicots
- Clade: Rosids
- Order: Fabales
- Family: Fabaceae
- Subfamily: Faboideae
- Genus: Astragalus
- Species: A. lineatus

Binomial name
- Astragalus lineatus Lam.

Synonyms
- Astragalus cappadocicus Boiss.; Astragalus chionophilus Boiss. & Heldr.; Astragalus coelicolor Širj. & Rech.f.; Astragalus gezeldarensis Grossh.; Astragalus gorganicus Širj. & Rech.f.; Astragalus grammocalyx Boiss. & Hohen.; Astragalus jildisianus Bornm.; Astragalus lineatus subsp. longidens (Freyn) Ponert; Astragalus longidens Freyn; Astragalus sphaerocalyx Ledeb.; Saccocalyx lineatus (Lam.) Steven; Tragacantha cappadocica (Boiss.) Kuntze; Tragacantha chionophila (Boiss. & Heldr.) Kuntze; Tragacantha grammocalyx (Boiss. & Hohen.) Kuntze; Tragacantha lineata (Lam.) Kuntze; Tragacantha sphaerocalyx (Ledeb.) Kuntze

Species of legume

Astragalus lineatus, synonyms including Astragalus grammocalyx, is a species of milkvetch in the family Fabaceae.

== Description ==
Plants growing in the Khosrov Forest State Reserve of Armenia have been described as Astragalus grammocalyx. They are perennial plants of grayish–blue color. They lack stems and have subterranean stolons. They have dense pubescence that are square in shape and have simple hairs. There are 10–16 small leaflets in pairs which are ovate–elliptic in shape and the inflorescence is dense but not elongating after flowering. Plants flower from May to June and fruit from June to July. The calyx is tubular and inflated and the petals are a violet color.

== Distribution ==
Astragalus lineatus is native to Iran, Iraq, the Transcaucasus and Turkey. In Armenia, it has an extremely limited range in the Khosrov Forest State Reserve and is considered critically endangered. It grows in the subalpine belt at 2,500 m above sea level and is found in dry slopes, screes, on the steppe, and in open juniper forests.
