= Khor Virap State Sanctuary =

Protected wetland area in Armenia

- Խոր Վիրապ արգելավայր
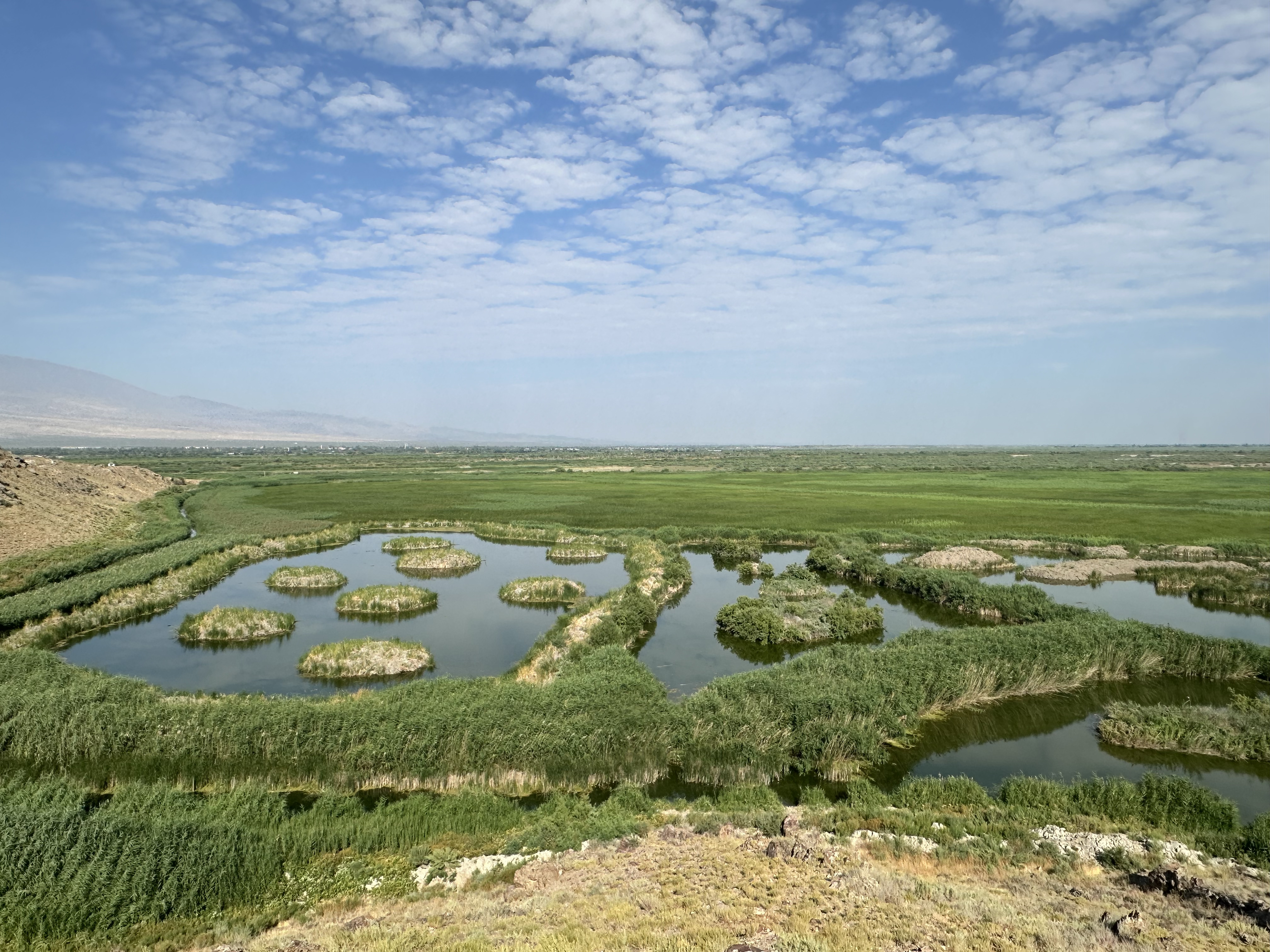
- Interactive map of Khor Virap State Sanctuary
- Nearest town: Pokr Vedi
- Coordinates: 39.88643833798335°N 44.570007319562144°E

Ramsar Wetland
- Official name: Khor Virap Marsh
- Designated: 25 January 2007
- Reference no.: 1989

The Khor Virap State Sanctuary is a wetland and protected area that was established within the administrative borders of Pokr Vedi village of the Ararat Province of Armenia, on the left bank of the Khor Virap Church of the Arax River and on 50.28 hectares of moist land of the right-hand side of Artashat, formerly the capital of Armenia.

== Main purpose ==
The main purpose of the organization of the Sanctuary is to ensure the preservation, normal development, reproduction and sustainable use of the ecosystem of wetlands of international significance, flora and fauna, especially for waterfowl and their habitats, rare plant species and their habitats. The specially protected objects of the Sanctuary area are the unique wildlife and water-swamp flora of the ecosystem of the Arax wetlands.

== Rare Species ==
The Khor Virap water-swamp ecosystem is distinguished by the rare species of flora and fauna, which are endangered to disappearance. In this area and its surroundings, there are such rare species as Falcaria falcarioides, Inula aucheriana, Sonchus araraticus, from the Chenopodiaceae species - Alhagi pseudoalhagi, Amberboa iljiniana, Tamarix octandra and so on.

=== Falcaria falcarioides ===
The Falcaria falcarioides are species being in a critical state. They grow in the lower mountainous belt, on the height of 800–900 meters above the sea level, on saline soils, in marshlands and moist meadows. Flowering in June, fruiting in July.

=== Inula aucheriana ===
Inula aucheriana is endangered species. Perennial herb 15–60 cm, usually covered by chondrose verrucose tubercles. Rhizome nodose. Leaves slightly fleshy. Capitula 5–8 mm in diameter, gathered in lax raceme. Ligulate flowers with 1–4 staminodia. Achenes glabrous or sparsely pilose. Grows in lower mountain belt, at the altitudes of 800–1100 meters above sea level. Flowering from July to August, fruiting from August to September.

=== Tamarix octandra ===
Tamarix octandra is an endangered species. It is a tree with a height of 2–2.5 meters, with a yellow-brown peat. It grows in the lower mountainous belt, at a height of 700–1100 meters above sea level. It flowers in May and fruits in June.

== Importance ==
The Khor Virap water-swamp area is of great importance as a habitat for a number of watering and waterfowl birds and as a resting place during the seasonal flight of birds. In particular, marbled duck (Marmaronetta angustirostris) and white-headed duck (Oxyura leucocephala) live here among the world-endangered birds, while the Dalmatian pelican (Pelecanus crispus) during the flight.

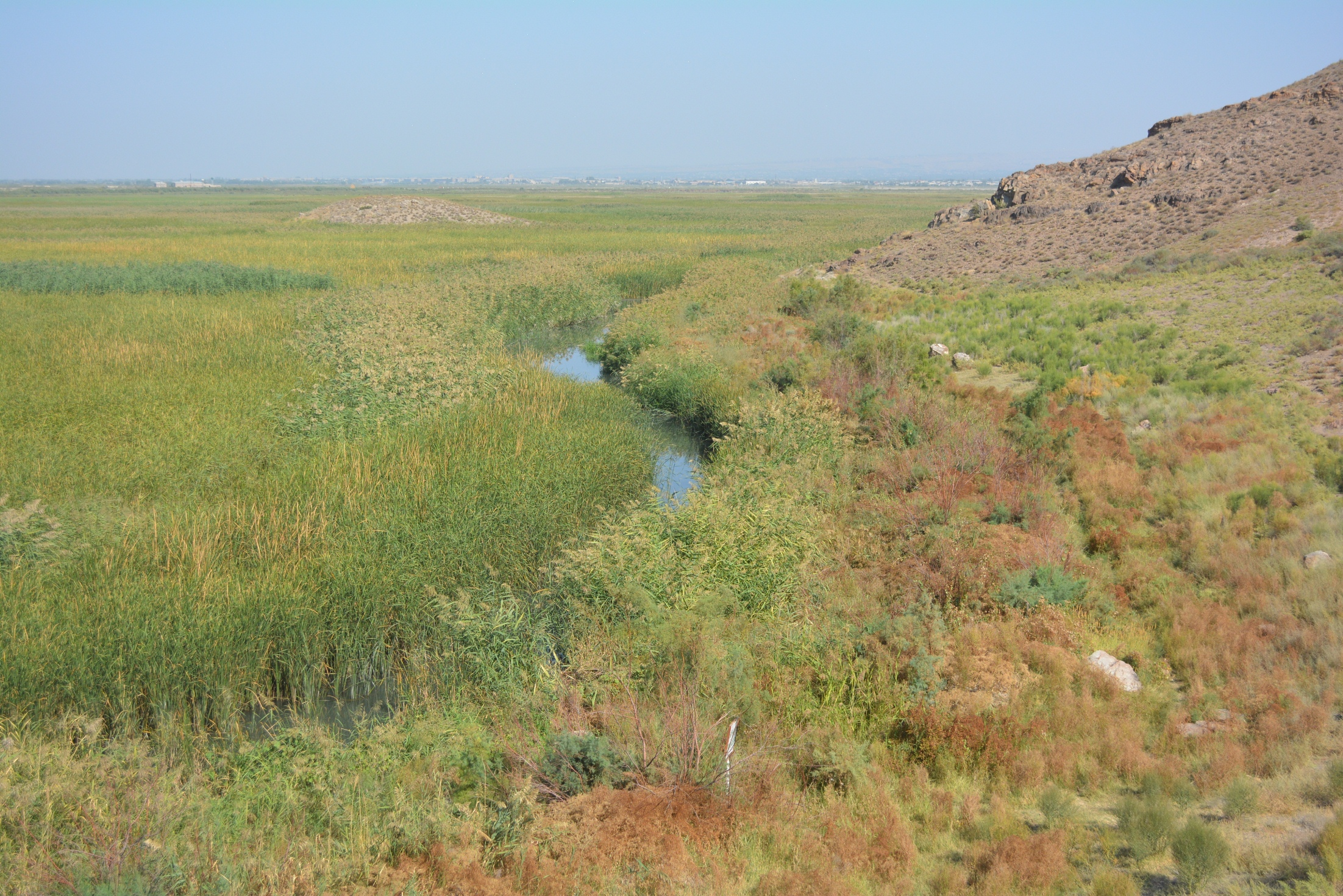
Khor Virap state sanctuary

Small Phalacrocorax pygmaeus, gadwall (Anas strepera), black-winged stilt (Himantopus himantopus), pied avocet (Recurvirostra avosetta) and bluethroat (Luscinia svecica) live in this territory among the species registered in the Red Book of Armenia. Great cormorant (Phalacrocorax carbo), great egret (Ardea alba), Eurasian spoonbill or common spoonbill (Platalea leucorodia), glossy ibis (Plegadis falcinellus), greylag goose (Anser anser), common shelduck (Tadorna tadorna), northern shoveler (Anas clypeata), pallid harrier (Circus macrourus), Montagu's harrier (Circus pygargus), Levant sparrowhawk (Accipiter brevipes), short-toed snake eagle (Circaetus gallicus), red-footed falcon (Falco vespertinus), Chettusia gregaria, Eurasian oystercatcher (Haematopus ostralegus), short-eared owl (Asio flammeus), woodchat shrike (Lanius senator) and barred warbler (Sylvia nisoria) live here among rare and disappearing birds.

The territories with the above-mentioned preconditions are considered as the areas subject to the priority inclusion in the list of moist areas of international importance of the convention (Ramsar, 1971) on “Moist Territories having International Importance, mainly as Habitat for waterfowl birds”.

In addition to the birds, the bats of the Red Book of Armenia, i.e. Mehely's horseshoe bat (Rhinolophus mehelyi), the Levant barbastelle (Barbastella leucomelas) and the Schreibers' long-fingered bat, search for food here in the hot months of the year.

The water-swamp area creates a unique moist microclimate that is evidenced by dry climatic conditions during the summer drought and even in winter when the green color of the water-swamp flora gives a special beauty to the environment.

Thus, the Khor Virap water-swamp area is distinguished by its high ecological, scientific and recreational significance, the loss of which, in particular, as an area for waterfowl birds, will cause irreversible damage to Armenia's biodiversity.
