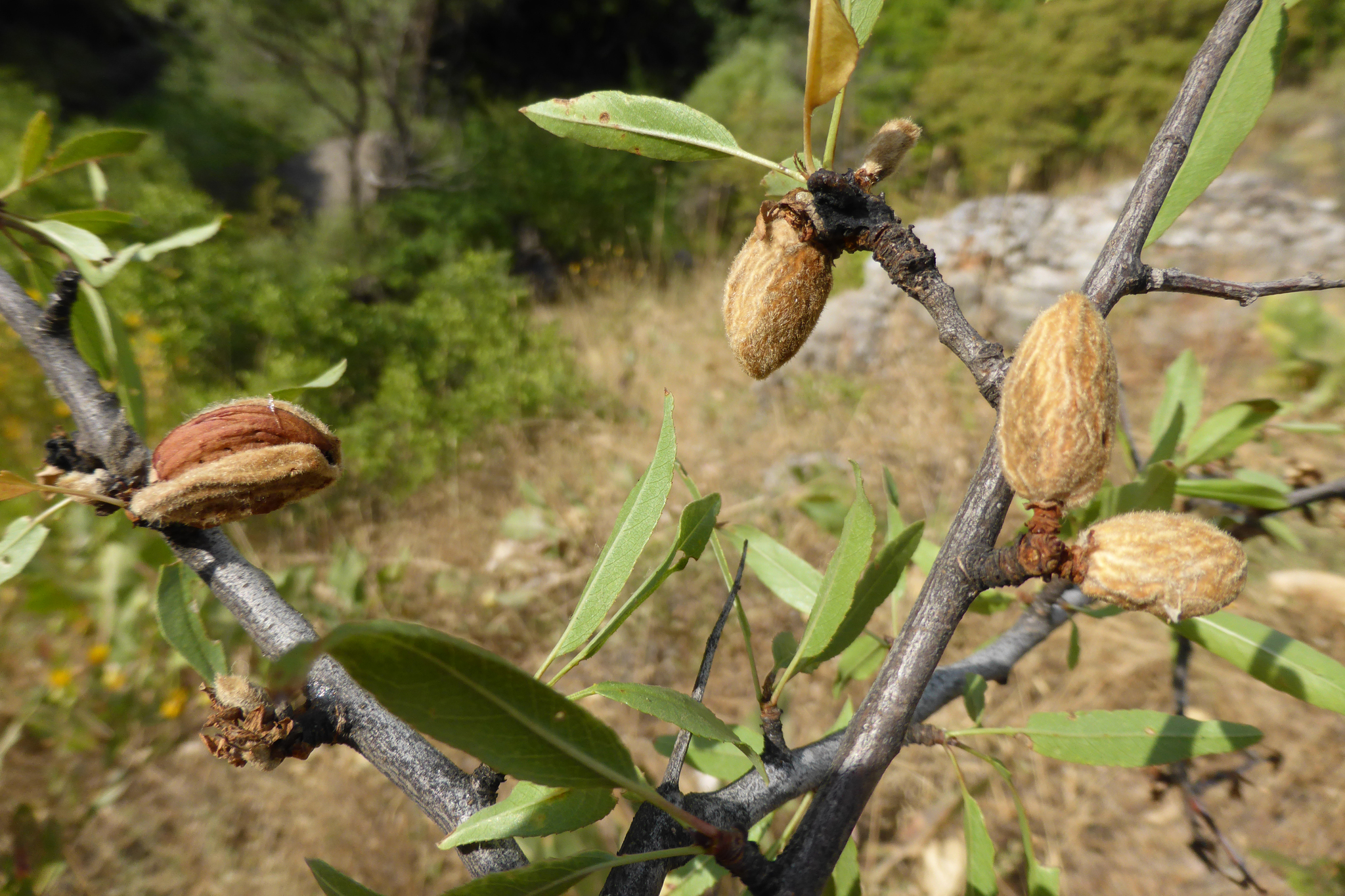
- In Armenia

Conservation status
- Data Deficient (IUCN 3.1)

Scientific classification
- Kingdom: Plantae
- Clade: Embryophytes
- Clade: Tracheophytes
- Clade: Spermatophytes
- Clade: Angiosperms
- Clade: Eudicots
- Clade: Rosids
- Order: Rosales
- Family: Rosaceae
- Genus: Prunus
- Species: P. fenzliana

Binomial name
- Prunus fenzliana Fritsch

Synonyms
- Amygdalus fenzliana (Fritsch) Korsh.; Amygdalus fenzliana (Fritsch) Lipsky; Amygdalus nairica Fed. & Takht.; Prunus nairica (Fed. & Takht.) Eisenman; Amygdalus pseudopersica (Tamamsch.) Fed. & Takht.; Amygdalus urartu Tamamsch.; Prunus urartu (Tamamsch.) Eisenman; Amygdalus gjarnyensis Tamamsch.; Amygdalus grossheimii Tamamsch.; Amygdalus zangezura Fed. & Takht.

= Prunus fenzliana =

Species of wild almond from the Caucasus

Prunus fenzliana is a species of wild almond native to the Caucasus areas of Turkey, Armenia, Azerbaijan and Iran, preferring to grow at 1400-3500 m above sea level. On the basis of morphology it has been long thought to be one of the wild species that contributed to the origin of the cultivated almond (Prunus dulcis). Genetic testing of both nuclear and chloroplast DNA has confirmed that it is the closest relative (and presumed lone ancestor) of Prunus dulcis.

== Description ==
Prunus fenzliana is a tall shrub or small tree reaching 4 m. It can be distinguished from its close relatives by a number of features, including having one-year-old twigs that are reddish on the side exposed to the sun, green elsewhere. The fruits start a dark green and mature to light tan. When fully mature the fruits, much like its domesticated counterpart, pop open to reveal the seed which can be up to 1 cm long.
