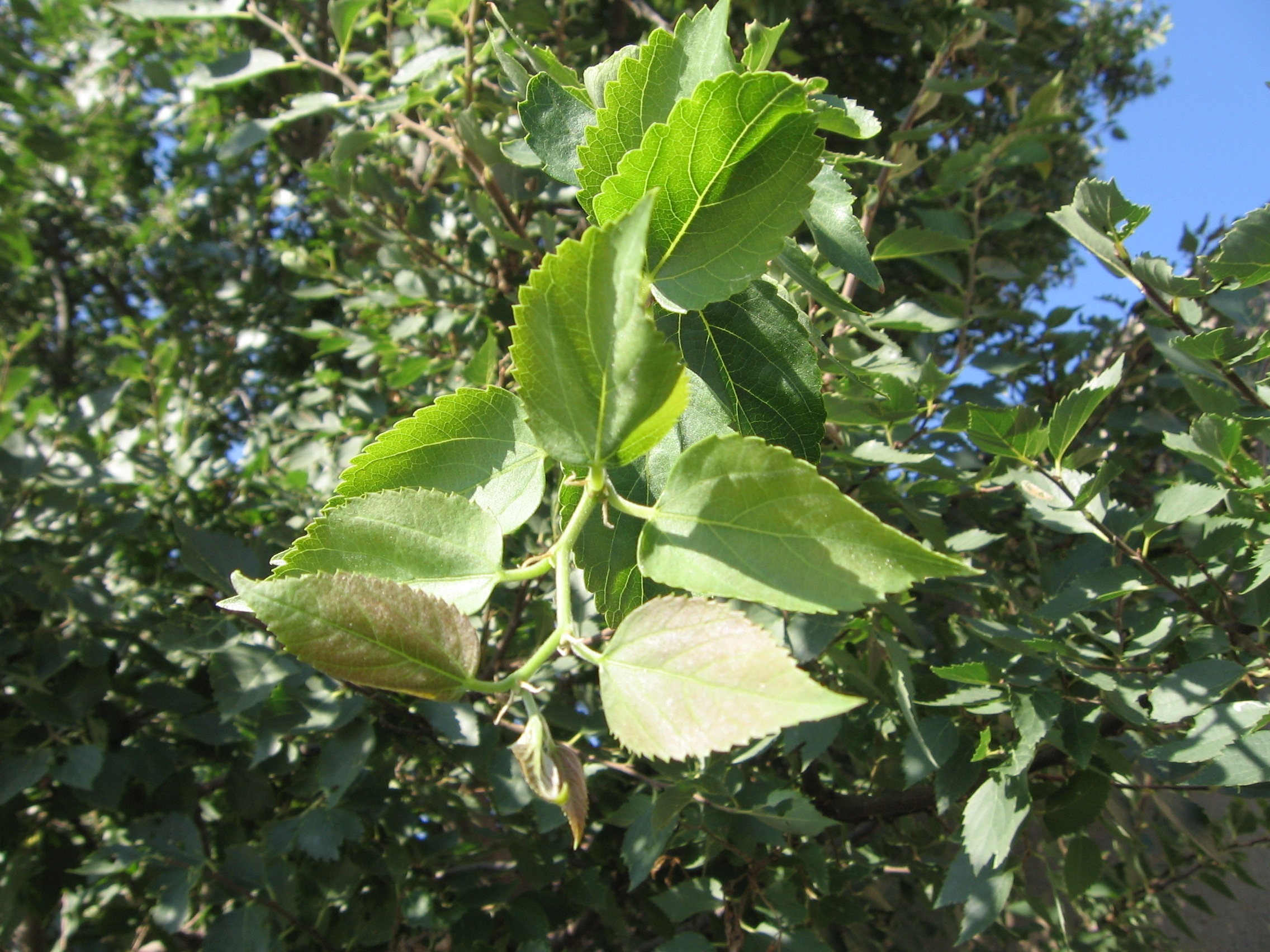

Conservation status
- Data Deficient (IUCN 3.1)

Scientific classification
- Kingdom: Plantae
- Clade: Embryophytes
- Clade: Tracheophytes
- Clade: Spermatophytes
- Clade: Angiosperms
- Clade: Eudicots
- Clade: Rosids
- Order: Rosales
- Family: Cannabaceae
- Genus: Celtis
- Species: C. glabrata

Binomial name
- Celtis glabrata Steven ex Planch.

Synonyms
- Celtis planchoniana K.I.Chr.; Celtis tournefortii var. glabrata (Steven ex Planch.) Boiss.

= Celtis glabrata =

Species of flowering plant

Celtis glabrata is a deciduous tree in the genus Celtis, native to parts of eastern Europe and western Asia.

== Description ==
Celtis glabrata is a large shrub or a small tree.

== Range and habitat ==
Celtis glabrata is known from scattered locations in southeastern Europe and western Asia, including Bulgaria, Romania, North Macedonia, Greece, Ukraine (Crimea), southern Russia, Armenia, Azerbaijan, Georgia, Turkey, Lebanon, and Syria.

It is generally found in dry and rocky areas, including inland cliffs and mountainsides, from sea level up to 900 meters elevation.
