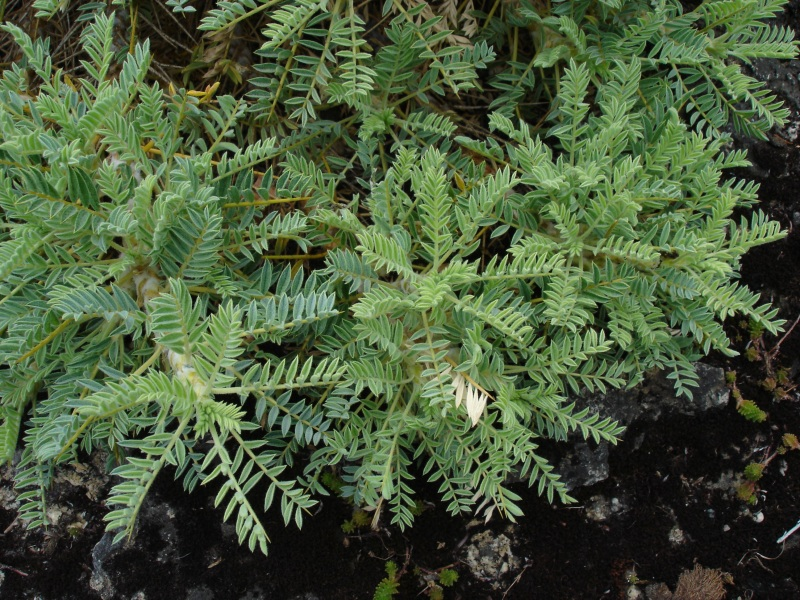

Scientific classification
- Kingdom: Plantae
- Clade: Tracheophytes
- Clade: Angiosperms
- Clade: Eudicots
- Clade: Rosids
- Order: Fabales
- Family: Fabaceae
- Subfamily: Faboideae
- Genus: Astragalus
- Species: A. microcephalus

Binomial name
- Astragalus microcephalus Willd.

Synonyms
- Of the species: Astracantha microcephala (Willd.) Podlech; Tragacantha microcephala (Willd.) Kuntze; Of subsp. microcephalus: Astracantha adusta (Bunge) Podlech; Astracantha aitosensis (Ivan.) Podlech; Astracantha arnacantha subsp. aitosensis (Ivan.) Réer & Podlech; Astracantha atenica (Ivan.) Podlech; Astracantha bienerti (Bunge) Podlech; Astracantha erinacea (Kuntze) Podlech; Astracantha ghilanica (Fisch.) Podlech; Astracantha gudrathii (Al.Fed., Fed. & Rzazade) Podlech; Astracantha terekensis (Al.Fed., Fed. & Rzazade) Podlech; Astragalus adustus Bunge; Astragalus aitosensis Ivan.; Astragalus arnacantha subsp. aitosensis (Ivan.) Maassoumi; Astragalus atenicus Ivan.; Astragalus bibracteolatus Širj. & Rech.f.; Astragalus bienertii Bunge; Astragalus eriocaulos DC.; Astragalus fissilis subsp. neglectus Freyn; Astragalus fissilis Freyn & Sint. ex Sommier & Levier; Astragalus fissus Freyn & Sint.; Astragalus getschesarensis Širj. & Bornm.; Astragalus ghilanicus Fisch.; Astragalus gudrathii Al.Fed., Fed. & Rzazade; Astragalus neglectus (Freyn) Freyn, nom. illeg.; Astragalus pycnophyllus Steven; Astragalus senganensis Bunge; Astragalus terekensis Al.Fed., Fed. & Rzazade; Tragacantha adusta (Bunge) Kuntze; Tragacantha bienertii (Bunge) Kuntze; Tragacantha erinacea Kuntze; Tragacantha eriocaulos (DC.) Steven; Tragacantha ghilanica (Fisch.) Kuntze; Tragacantha pycnophylla (Steven) Steven; Tragacantha senganensis (Bunge) Kuntze; Of subsp. pycnocladus: Astragalus brantii Eig; Astragalus gerruensis Bornm. & Širj.; Astragalus glaucopsiformis Maassoumi; Astragalus parrowianus var. intermedius Širj. & Bornm.; Astragalus pirimukurunicus Eig; Astragalus pycnocladus Boiss. & Hausskn.

= Astragalus microcephalus =

Species of plant

Astragalus microcephalus is a species of flowering plant in the family Fabaceae, native from Bulgaria to Iran. It was first described by Carl Ludwig Willdenow in 1802. The species and its two subspecies have acquired a large number of synonyms. Under a synonym of Astragalus microcephalus subsp. microcephalus, Astragalus atenicus, plants occurring in Georgia were assessed as "vulnerable".

== Subspecies ==
As of April 2023, Plants of the World Online accepted two subspecies:

- Astragalus microcephalus subsp. microcephalus
- Astragalus microcephalus subsp. pycnocladus (Boiss. & Hausskn.) Širj.

== Distribution ==
Astragalus microcephalus is native to southeast Bulgaria, Iran, Iraq, the North Caucasus, the South Caucasus (Transcaucasus) and Turkey. A. microcephalus subsp. microcephalus is native to Bulgaria, Iran, the North Caucasus, the South Caucasus and Turkey; A. microcephalus subsp. pycnocladus is found only in northeast Iraq and northwest Iran.

== Conservation ==
Astragalus atenicus was assessed as "vulnerable" in the 2007 IUCN Red List, where it is said to be native only to Kvemo Kartli in eastern Georgia, being found on stony and rubbly sites, in the mid-montane zone between elevations of 1,400 and 1,800 m. As of April 2023, A. atenicus was regarded as a synonym of A. microcephalus subsp. microcephalus, which has a wider distribution outside Georgia.
