= Pokr Vedi =

Pokr Vedi Փոքր Վեդի
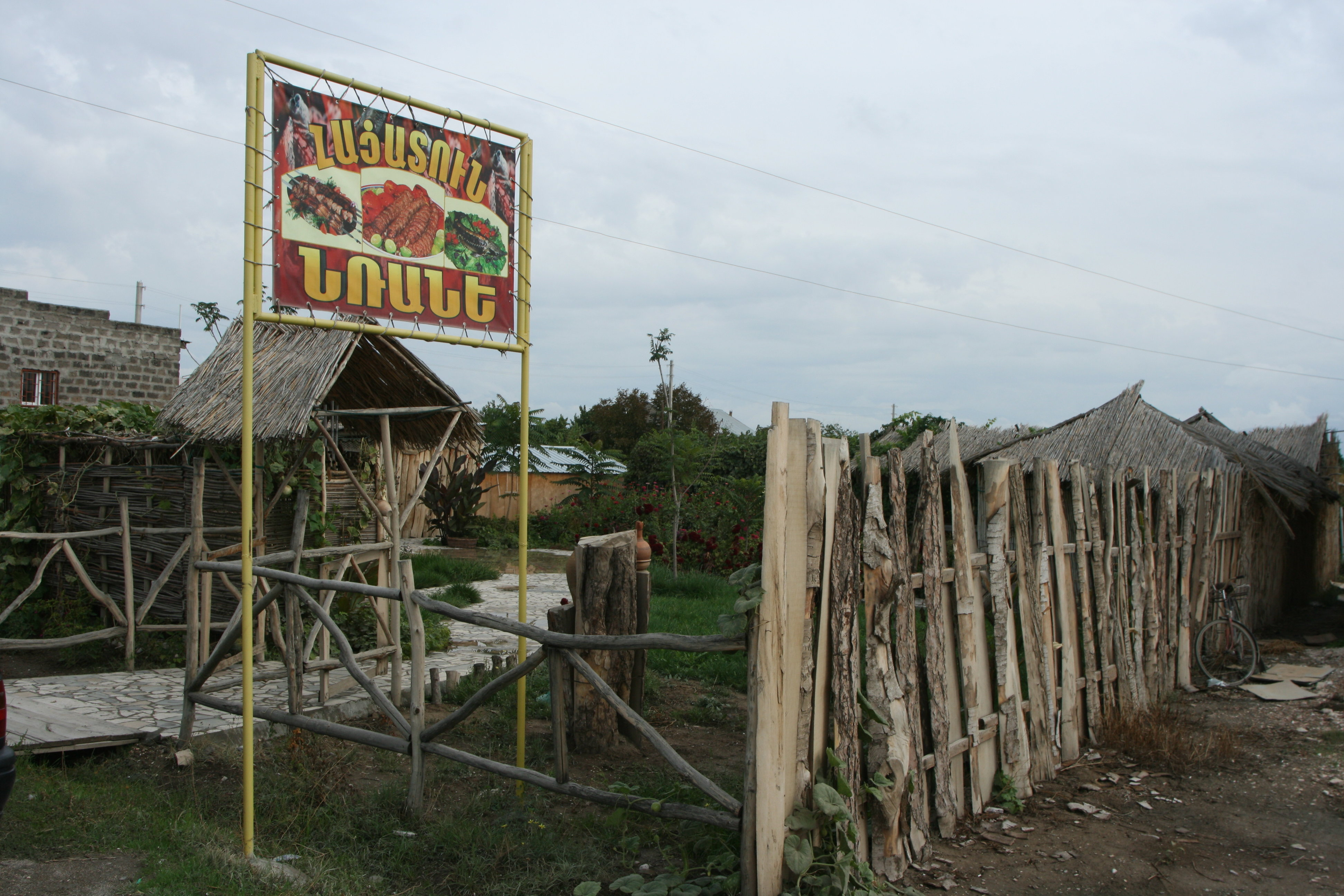

- Location within Armenia Location within Ararat
- Coordinates: 39°53′42″N 44°36′45″E
- Country: Armenia
- Province: Ararat
- Municipality: Vedi

Population (2011)
  - Total: 2,772
- Time zone: UTC+4

Pokr Vedi (Armenian: Փոքր Վեդի) is a village in the Vedi Municipality of the Ararat Province of Armenia.
