= Kecharis Monastery =

Medieval Armenian monastery complex

Kecharis Monastery Կեչառիս Վանք
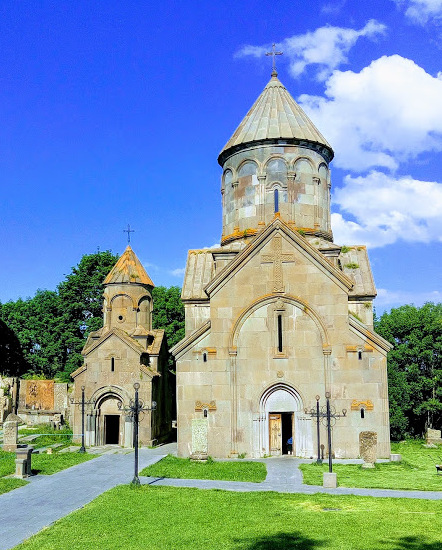

- Location within Armenia

Religion
- Affiliation: Armenian Apostolic Church

Location
- Location: Tsakhkadzor, Kotayk Province, Armenia
- Coordinates: 40.532358°N 44.719644°E

Architecture
- Style: Armenian
- Completed: 11th–13th centuries

Kecharis Monastery (Armenian: Կեչառիսի վանքային համալիր), is a medieval Armenian monastic complex dating back to the 11th to 13th centuries, located 60 km from Yerevan, in the ski resort town of Tsaghkadzor in Armenia. Kecharis monastery, formerly called Kecharuk, was built in the Ayrarat region of ancient Armenia, in Varazhnunk, the 18th province, which included much of the present-day Hrazdan, Sevan and Ijevan. In the time of the Arsacid dynasti, this province was a royal hunting preserve. It then became the property of the Varazhnuni family. As far back as the 1st century, the region belonged to the Pahlavuni princes and was called Tzaghkanots. Nestled in the Pambak mountains, Kecharis was founded by a Pahlavuni prince in the 11th century, and construction continued until the middle of the 13th century with its acquisition by the Proshian family. In the 12th and 13th centuries, Kecharis was a major religious center of Armenia and a place of higher education. Today, the monastery has been fully restored and is clearly visible from the ski slopes.

The domes of the two main churches were heavily damaged in an earthquake in 1927. The buildings were conserved during the period of the Armenian SSR, and rebuilding work started in the 1980s. A series of nationwide problems led to a halt in the rebuilding for about a decade as the 1988 Armenian earthquake hit, the Soviet Union collapsed in 1991, the First Nagorno-Karabakh War broke out, and Armenia was blockaded by its two allied Turkic neighbors. Rebuilding work resumed at Kecharis in 1998 and finished in 2000. The restarted work was paid for by an Armenian donor from Vienna, Vladimir Harutyunian, in memory of his parents Harutyun and Arsenik.

== Complex ==
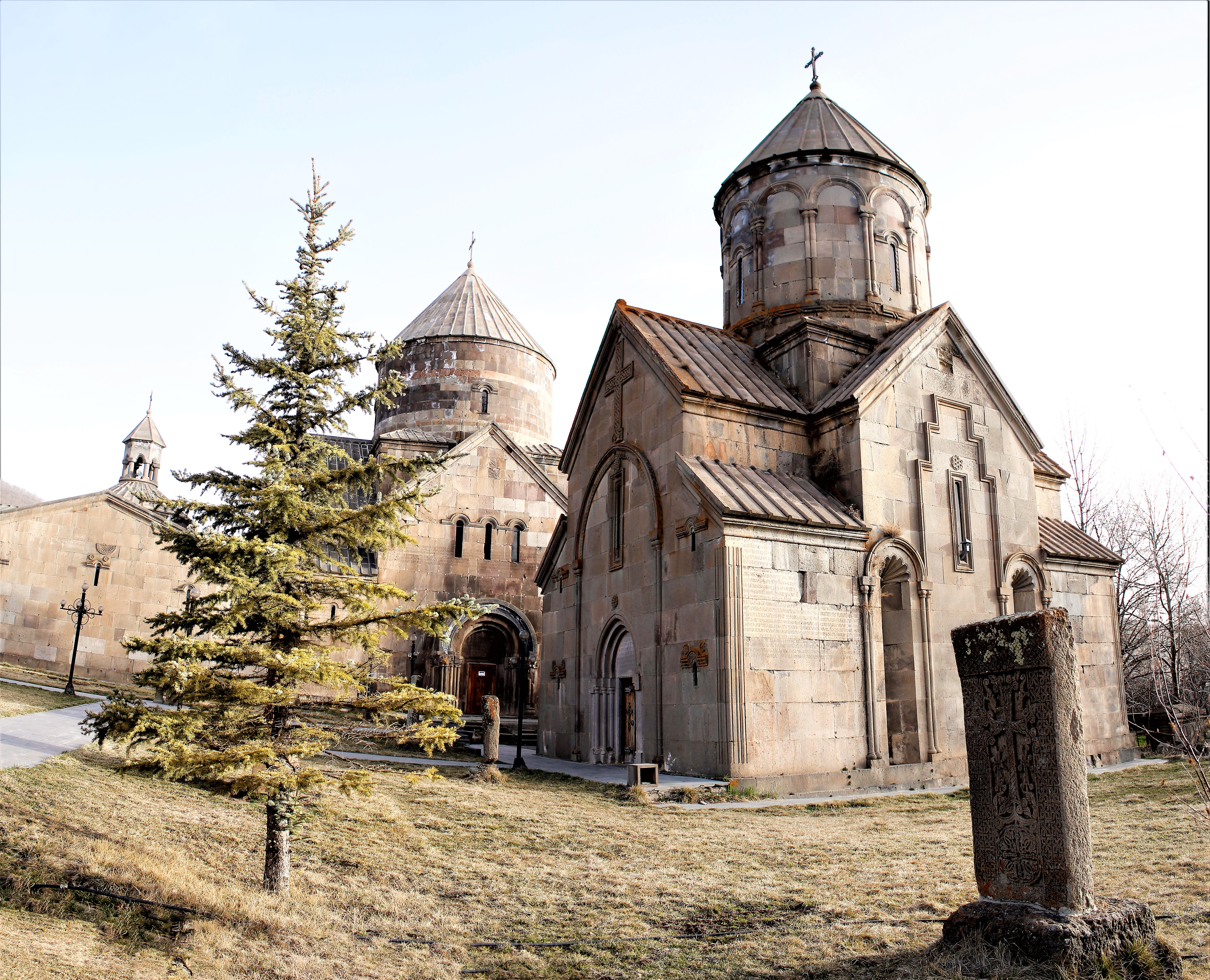

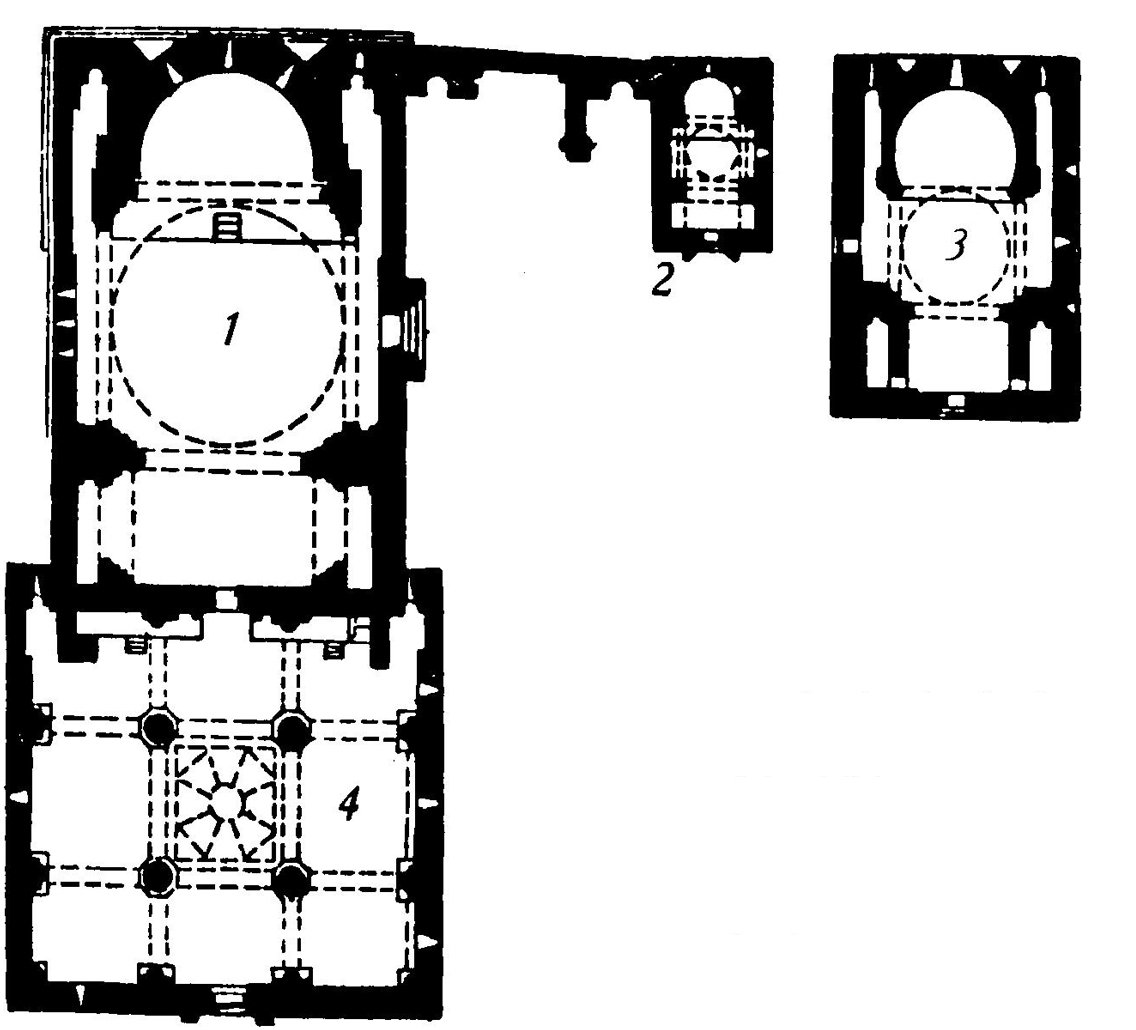
Plan of Kecharis Monastery

The main group of the complex consists of three churches, two chapels and a gavit, to the west of which, a few dozen meters away, there is another church with its own vestry at the side of a road leading to the forest. There still are many tombstones around these monuments.

=== Saint Grigor Lusavorich Church ===
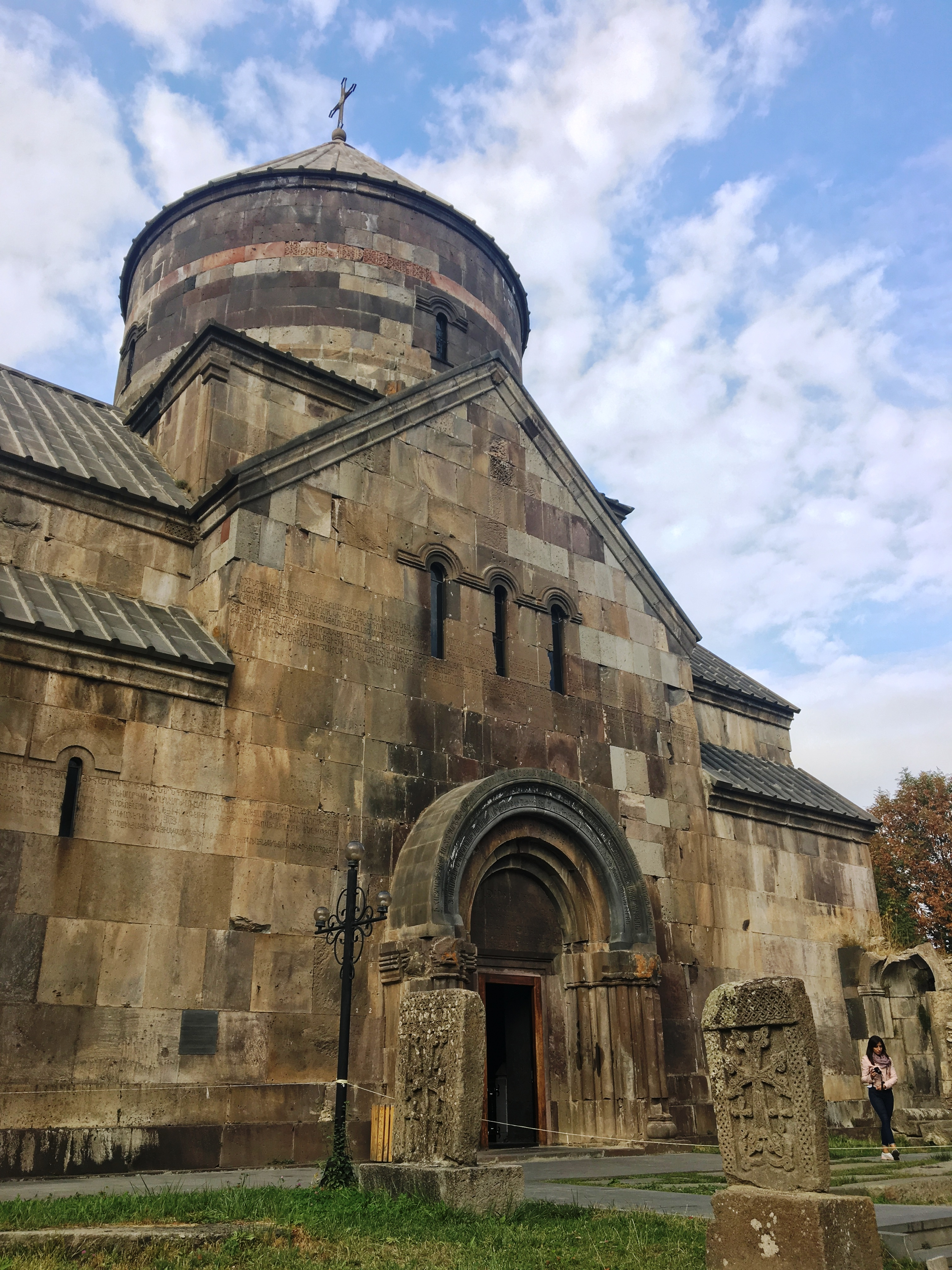
Saint Grigor Church

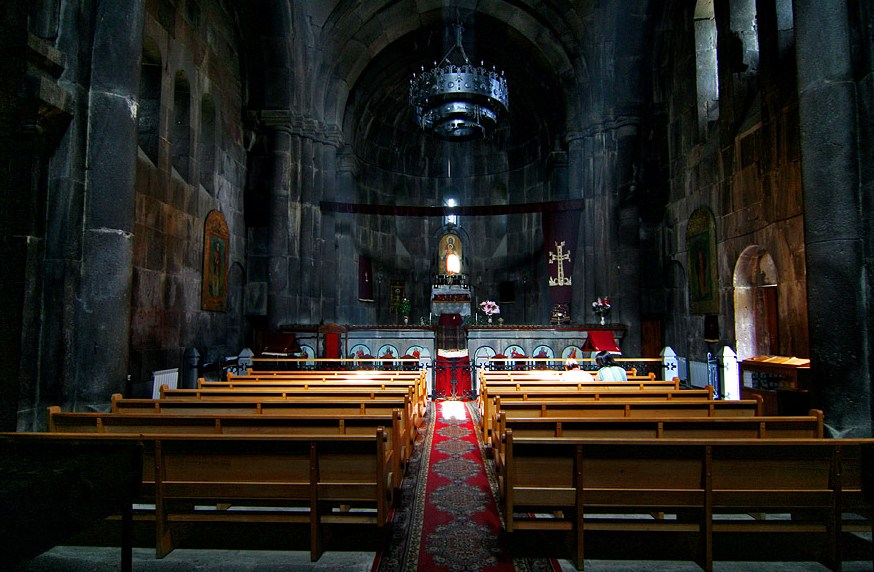
Saint Grigor altar

The main temple, the church of Saint Grigor, is the monastery's first structure erected by Grigor Magistros Pahlavuni in 1013. Being of a domed hall type, it is one of the typical church structures of the period of developed feudalism in Armenia. The interior of the temple is divided into three spaces by two pairs of wall-attached abutments. The central (and largest) space of the church is crowned by a broad cupola resting on spherical pendentives. The cupola and pendentives were destroyed by an earthquake in 1927, and reconstructed in 2000.

The semicircular altar apse has two-storey vestries on either side. Three triangular niches behind the altar provide openings for light. The sole of the altar has carved geometrical ornament, alternating with rosettes in places.

=== Surp Nshan Church ===
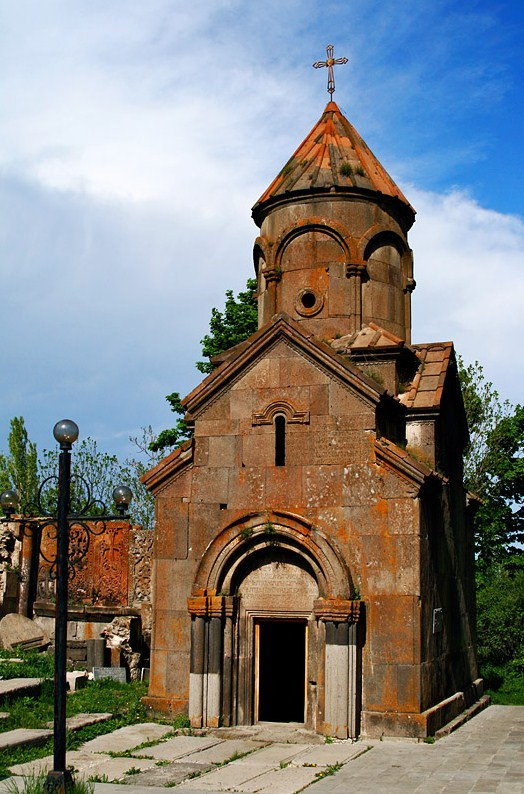
S. Nshan Church

The church of Surp Nshan (Armenian: Սուրբ Նշան, "Holy Sign of Cross" in Armenian), situated south of the church of Grigor, is a small cross-winged domed structure built, judging by the type of the building and by architectural details, in the 11th century, probably soon after the church of S. Grigor.

=== Katoghike Church ===
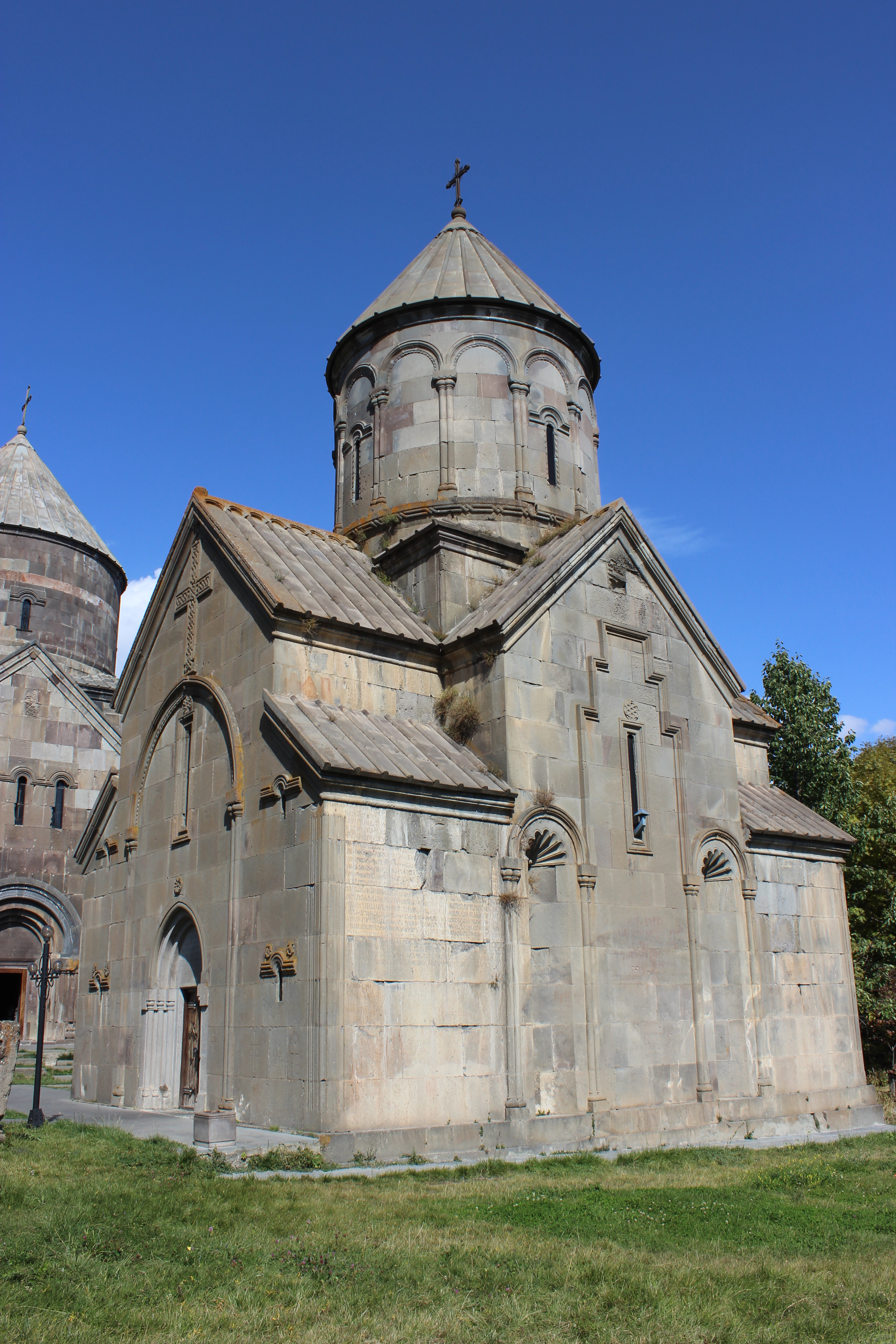
Katoghike Church

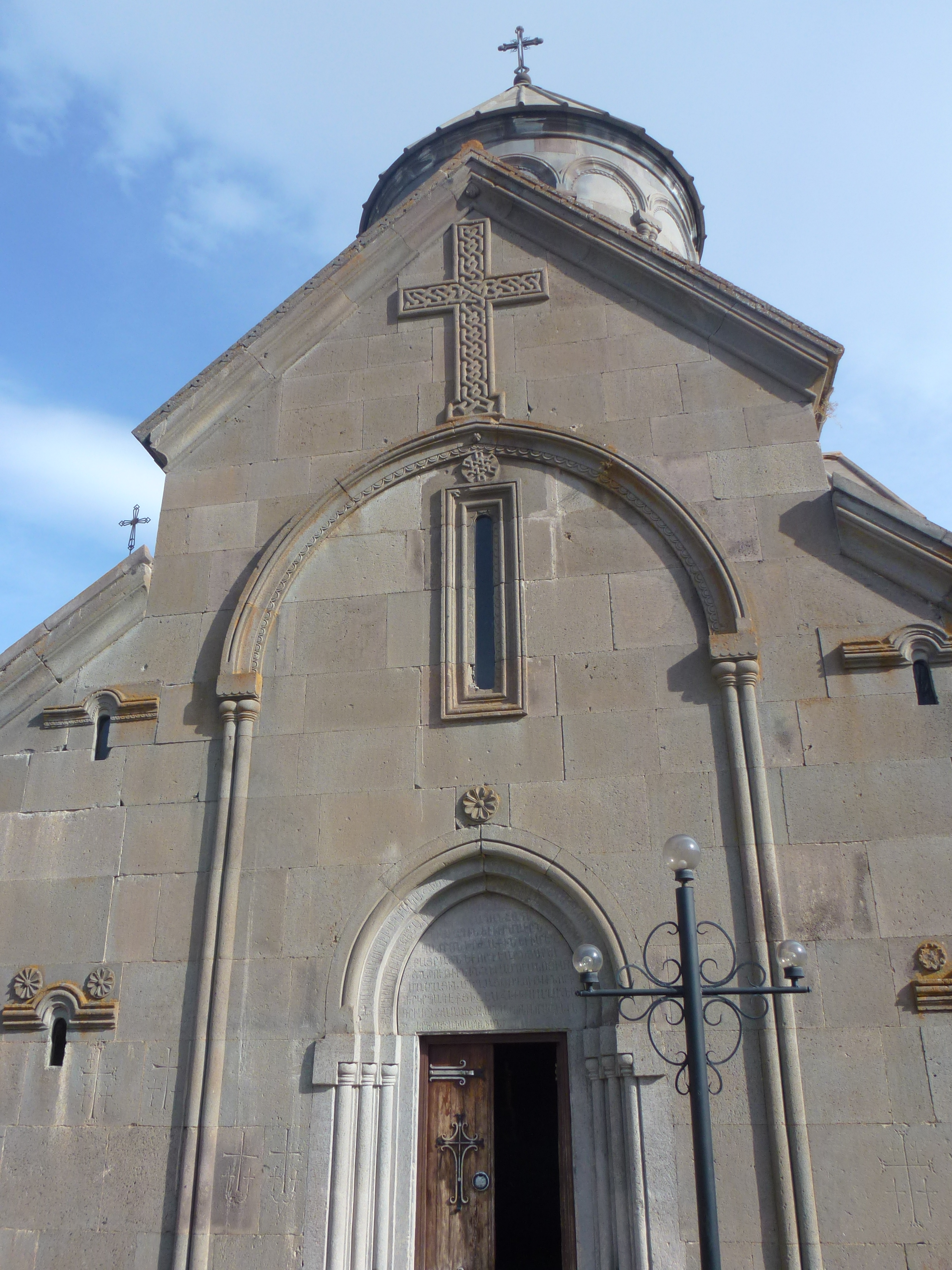
Katoghike Church

The Katoghike (Cathedral) church stands south of S. Nshan, with a narrow passage dividing them. Judging by an inscription, it was built under Prince Vasak Khakhpakyan of the Proshyan clan (in the first quarter of the 13th century) by the architect Vetsik, in whose memory a khachkar, ornamented with highly artistic carving, was put up a little south of the church.

The Katoghike church belongs to the cross-winged domed type and has two-story annexes in all the four corners of the prayer hall. The entrances to the upper eastern annexes are from the side of the altar apse. Stone cantilever stairs lead to the western annexes of the first floor.

The character of Katoghike church's decoration is connected with the artistic traditions of the time when it was built. The round cupola drum was destroyed by earthquake in 1927 (also rebuilt in by 2000), and is decorated with a 12-arch arcature. The front wall of the altar has carved khachkar-type crosses, and there are rosettes on the walls and on the spherical pendentives of the cupola where they alternate with flat arch motives.

=== Gavit ===
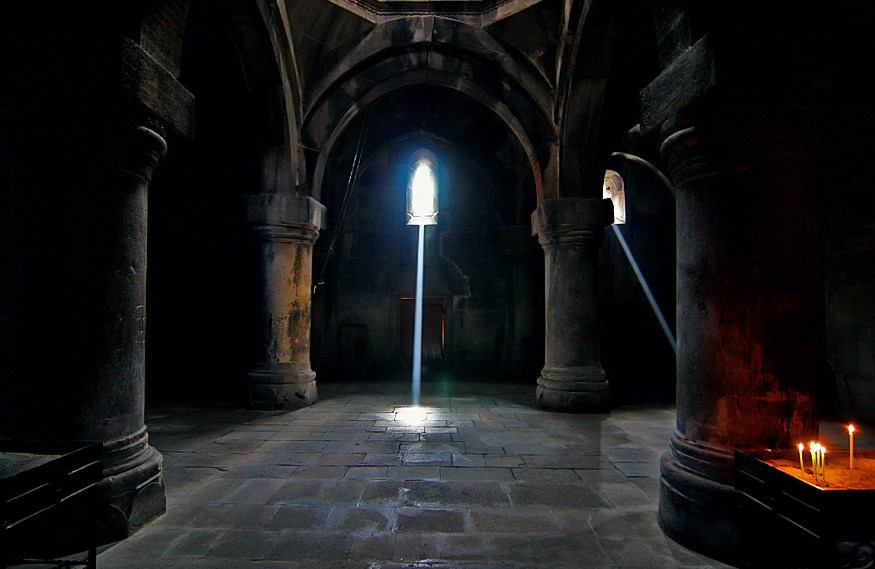
Gavit interior

The gavit, built in the second half of the 12th century and attached to the western facade of S. Grigor church, is an early structure of this type. The rectangular hall is divided into nine sections by four heavy free-standing columns.

The eastern corners of the interior are taken up by small two-storey annexes which first appeared in this form in this gavit.

The architectural details of the building are rather modest. The small windows are topped by profiled edges above which there are, in the middle window of the southern facade, octafoil rosettes and sun dials, widespread in Armenia and, on the western facade, jugs. As distinct from the portals of the churches, the only western entrance is built as a rectangular opening with a niche framed with bunches of small columns and an arch. In the interior, the fine geometrical ornaments on the capitals of the columns and on the cornice of the tent base immediately catch the eye.

=== Chapel of Saint Grigor ===
The chapels situated between the churches of Grigor Lusavorich and Surp Nshan were small rectangular ones, with an altar apse and vaulted ceilings. The chapel adjacent to the church of Gregory served as the burial vault of Grigor Magistros Pahlavuni, which means that it was built in the early 11th century. The chapels were united by a small, vaulted premise in which classes were probably conducted for the school's students.

=== Surp Harutyun ===
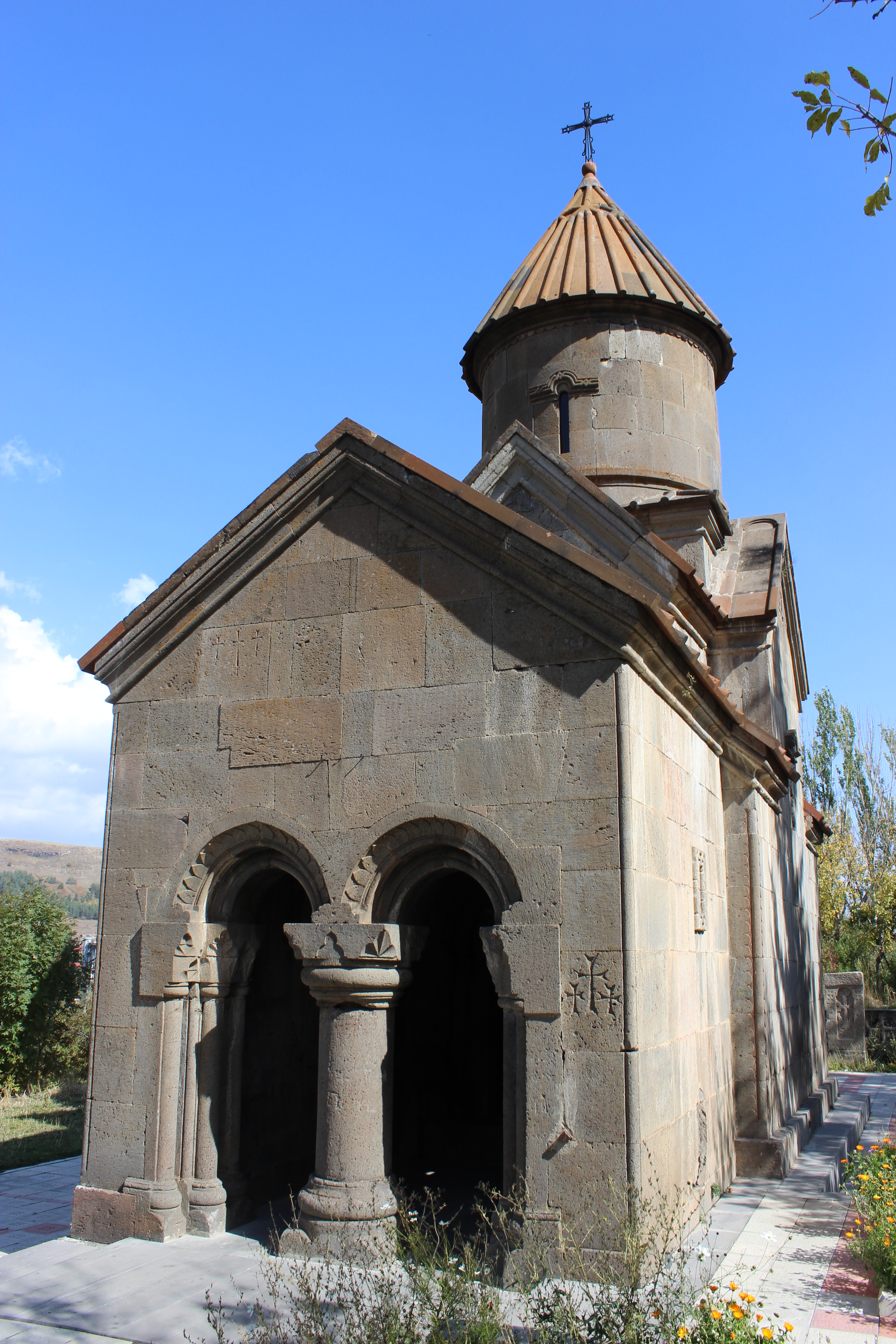
Surp Harutyun Church

The church of Surp Harutyun (Holy Resurrection), standing on a forest glade, away from the main group, was built by a son of Hasan in 1220. This is a small, outwardly rectangular. domed-hall church with a lofty cupola. The only entrance, with a small vestry in front of it, is from the west. As distinct from the ordinary vestries, it has a vaulted ceiling and is narrower than the church. A distinctive feature of the structure is that it has on its western facade, twin openings topped with arches which rest on the wall-attached and intermediate columns. This gives the structure the appearance of an open passage. There are many graves in the church which was probably a family burial vault.

Chronological History

1013–1033 - Grigor Magistros Pahlavuni builds the Church of St. Grigor Lusavorich (the Illuminator) in Kecharis. An inscription on the southern entrance mentions the date: 1033. However, the sovereign at the time, Gagik, and bishop Sargis, both also commemorated in the inscription, had already died before that date. So there is probably some mistake in this inscription. The probable construction date is 1013, when both the sovereign and the bishop were alive and Grigor Magistros was old enough to have undertaken such an initiative. Indeed, in the same year of 1013, Grigor Magistros built the church at the Havuts Tar monastery.

1045 - Ani is occupied by the Byzantines and the reign of the Bagratid family collapses. Grigor Magistros delivers Bjni and his other possessions to the Byzantines and, in exchange, was named Governor of Mesopotamia.

1048–1049 - The second Seljuk invasion into Armenia. This obliged Byzantium to change its policy as regards the Armenians and to look on Armenian princes with a certain sympathy. The influential Prince (Duke) Bagrat is named Governor of Ani, with a title Magistros of the East. The governorship-general of southern Armenia and, in particular, of the Taron and Vaspurakan regions, is entrusted to Grigor Magistros himself. Armenian governors are also appointed for the other regions in the country.

1051 - In this year, according to available historical sources (a document kept in the Sacred Congregation of Propaganda Fide archive in the Vatican and published in Paris in 1819 by Saint-Martin), Grigor Magistros builds church at Kecharis. Apart from the main Church of St. Grigor, the only other 11th-century church in the present-day monastery complex is the Church of Surp Nshan. It must therefore be deducted that this is the church referred to in the document. Further information from the same source reveals that the bishops of Bjni donated 25 villages and a town to the dioceses of Kecharis.

1054 - The third invasion of Armenia by Seljuks, led by Turkish chief Tughril. Occupying Vaspurakan, they drive towards the central and southern regions of Armenia. The same year, according to further evidence in the document mentioned earlier, Grigor Magistros, "with great effort, saved us and the famous churches": that is, the Churches of St. Grigor Lusavorich and of Surp Nshan.

1099 - Prince Apiratian of the Pahlavuni dynasty of Shirak leads the Armenian forces and joins battle with the Seljuks near the village of Kaghzevan in the Arsharunik region, After his victory, however, he is killed by an arrow. His body is taken to Kecharis where, with great ceremony, it is given a worthy burial.

1100–1161 - After the Seljuk invasion, the formerly flourishing regions of Ararat, Shirak, Vanand are ruined and laid waste. A contemporary manuscript mentions the serious situation that Kecharis, "once flourishing and now in ruins, now has to face.

1161–1165 - A new lease of life begins for the monasteries of Eastern Armenia. Life also resumes at Kecharis. The monastery receives large donations which are mentioned in inscriptions on the south walls of the Churches of St, Grigor and Surp Nshan.

1196 - Prince Zakare, son of Sargis Zakarian and commander-in-chief of the Ibero-Armenian armies, rids the regions of Amberd, Bjni, Ararat and Shirak of the Seljuk invaders. He also liberates Kecharis and makes it possible for work of new monastery buildings to begin.

1196–1206 - The courtyard or gavit of the monastery is built. There are no inscriptions to prove the dates are correct, but gavit must have been built after 1196, when monastery was rid of the Seljuks, and before 1206, since there is an inscription bearing this date on the north wall of the gavit itself.

1203 - The Zakarian brothers (Prince Zakare and Ivane) awarded Kecharis to Prince Vasak Khaghbakian ("Vasak the Great"), in recognition of the part he played in the liberation of Varajnunik and Vayots.

1203–1214 - Vasak Khaghbakian ("Vasak the Great") builds the Katoghike at Kecharis. There is no mention of the date in the inscriptions of the western entrance, but one of the inscriptions on the south wall bears the date 1214. Hence, the Katoghike must have been built between 1203 when Kecharis became Vasak's property, and 1214. On pedestal in the eastern part of the Church of St. Grigor stands a memorial cross in stone, khachkar, erected, according to the inscription it bears, to the memory of Vetsik the architect. On the eastern face of khachkar, it is stated that Vetsik built a new church in the monastery and that, immediately after its completion, he died. There is no mention of the name of the church referred to, nor it is said when Vetsik actually built it, but features of the style of the memorial cross suggest that it was made in the 13th century. Now there are only two 13th-century churches in Kecharis: the Katoghike itself and the Church of St Harutyun. The latter is also smaller and, from being at some distance from the rest of the monastery buildings, it may therefore be deduced that it was for his having built the Katoghike that Vetsik was considered worthy of being buried near the church and of having such an outstanding monument erected to his memory.

1220 - The Church of St. Harutyun is built at Kecharis. An inscription over the entrance of the church commemorates its construction.

1223 - According to an inscription, Paron Vache rebuilds the Church of Surp Nshan.

1248 - According to an inscription on the inside of the south wall of the gavit, Hasan, son of Vakhtank, lord of the fortress of Khachen Khoyakan and Hasan's wife Manakan, daughter of the king of Bagh, at great cost to themselves, reconstruct the ruined buildings of Kecharis. The drum of the dome of the Church of St. Grigor is also probably rebuilt during this period.

1284 - The "great prince" Prosh dies and is buried at Kecharis.

1295 - Khachatur Kecharetsi, the renowned man of religion and lyrical poet writes his The Lament, in which he weeps over the desolate conditions of his land under the Yoke of the Tartars and deplores the enfeeblement and gradual disappearance of the Armenian leading classes and the death of the most famous Armenian princes. Khachatur Ketcharetsi wrote a good deal of poetry and also a fresh version of the History of Alexander, King of Macedonia by Pseudo-Callisthenes, which had been widely diffused in Armenia. Furthermore, he founded a school at Kecharis, whose disciplines were later to be mentioned in manuscripts recopied in other manuscripts.

1300-1450 - There is no information available about Kecharis in these 150 years. The domination of Islam, plundering, persecutions and heavy taxes put an end to donations made to the monastery. Thus there are none of the usual commemorative inscriptions. The situation is the same for nearly all the monasteries in Armenia.

1491 - The Evangelistary is copied at Kecharis. In the colophon, Galust, the scribe, mentions "the hard, bad times and the evils afflicted by the ungodly".

1499 - While Pillipos is abbot of the monastery, the Ritual Book of Ordination (Mashtots) is copied at Kecharis. In his colophon, Matteos, the scribe, lists the churches of St. Astvatsatsin, Surp Nshan, St. Grigor Lusavorich. The katoghike has probably been renamed the Church of Astvatsatsin.

1500-1700 - In spite of the country's disastrous conditions (for Armenia is the theatre of the Turco-Persian wars), cultural and religious life continues in Kecharis. Numerous manuscripts are copied, some of which were kept and still exist today.

1700-1800 - Kecharis is deserted.

1826 - The dome of the Church of St. Grigor Lusavorich is destroyed in an earthquake.

1843 - Now that the dome of the Church of St. Grigor Lusavorich is no more, an altar is built on the western side of the gavit so that church facilities are now available for the people who come to Kecharis and stay there during the summer.

1920-1937 - The Kecharis buildings are partially restored. The walls are strengthened and the roofs recovered with sheet metal and tiles.

1947-1949 - The Committee for the Conservation of Monuments in the Armenian S.S.R restores the whole of the Kecharis monastery. The roofs are slabbed with stone and the whole complex is renovated and surrounded by walls.

== Gallery ==
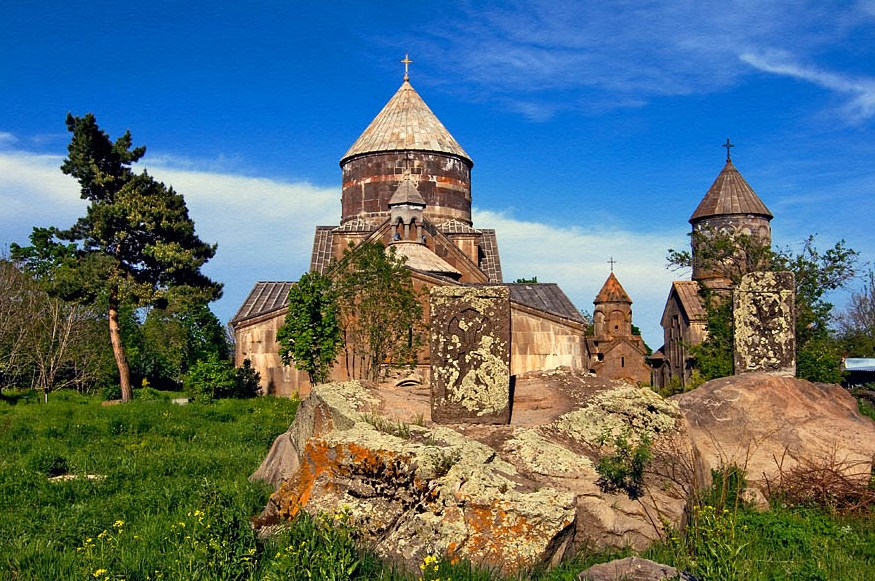
Another view of the complex

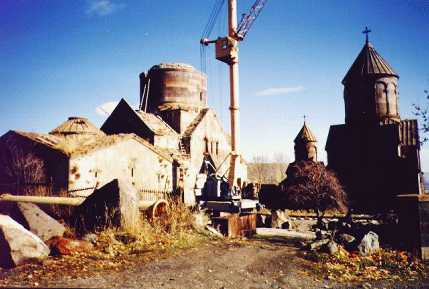
1995 photo showing halted reconstruction

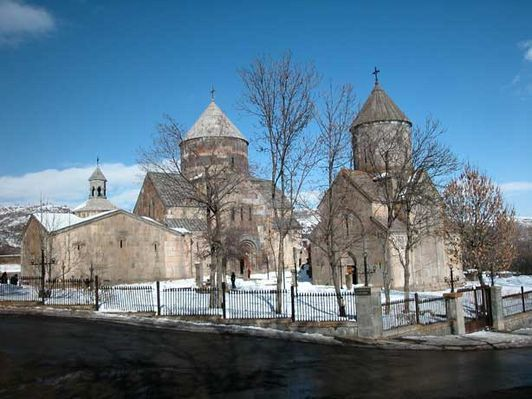
View from the entrance

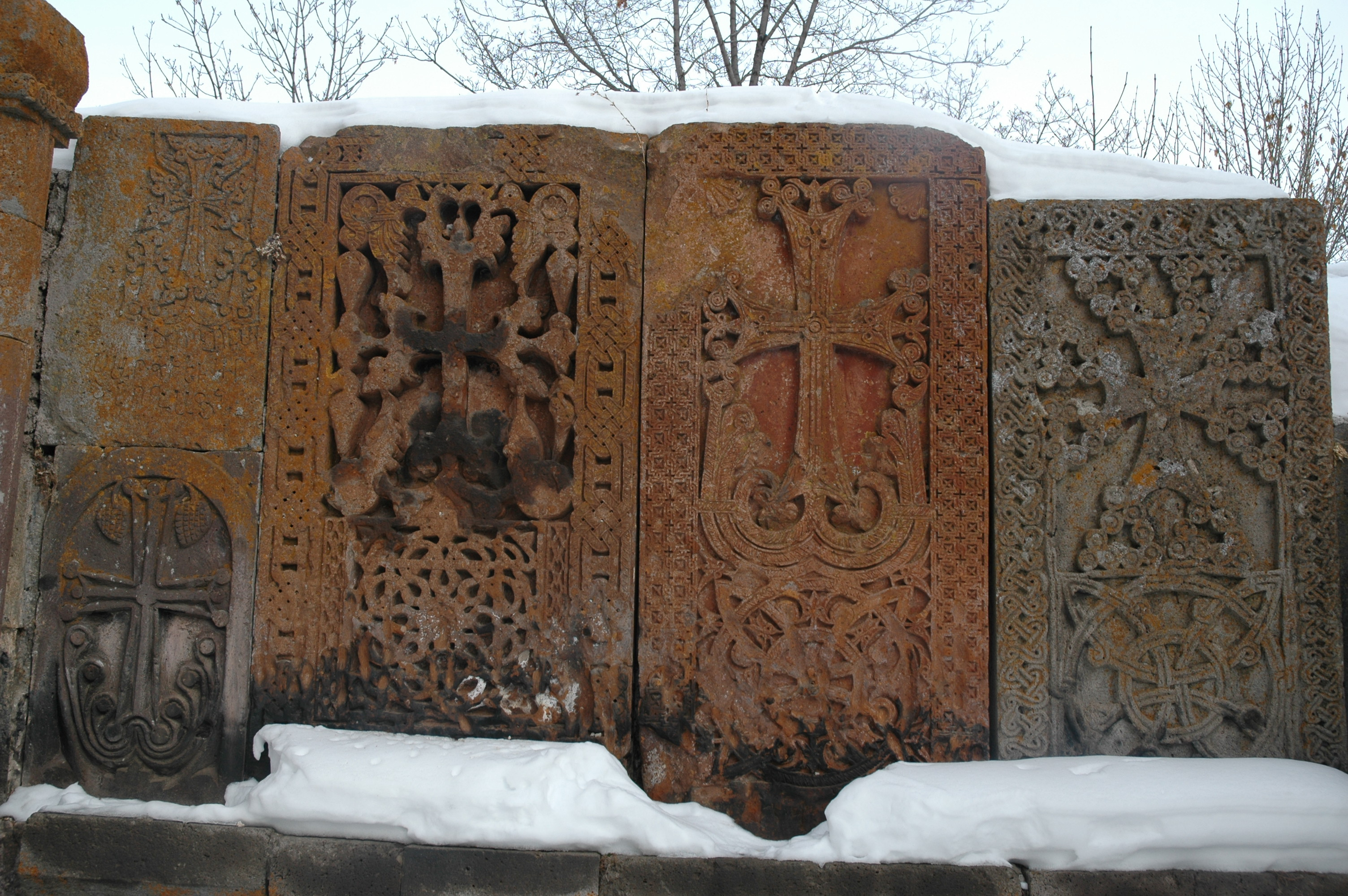
Row of khachkars in the snow

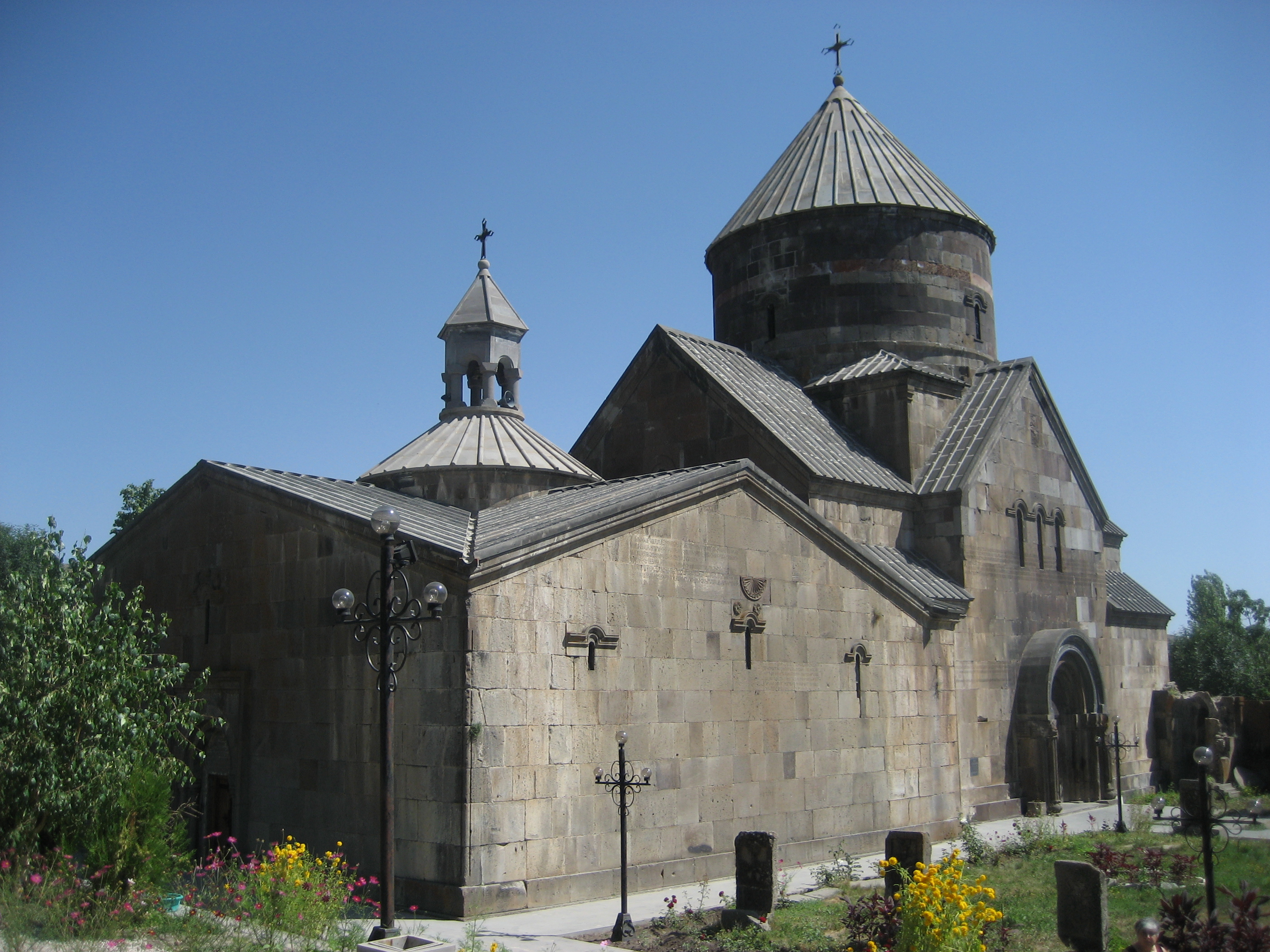
S. Grigor Church with gavit in front

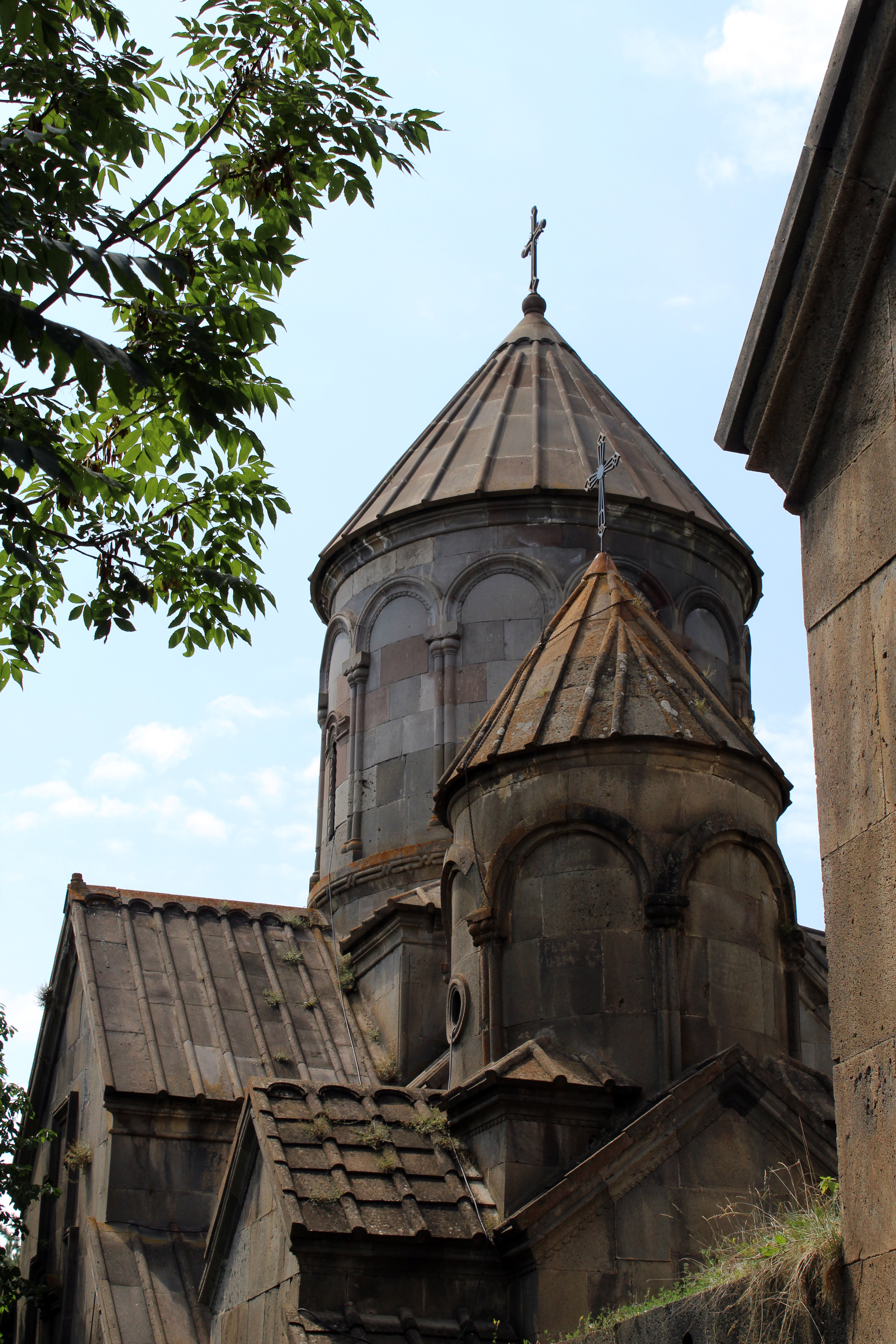

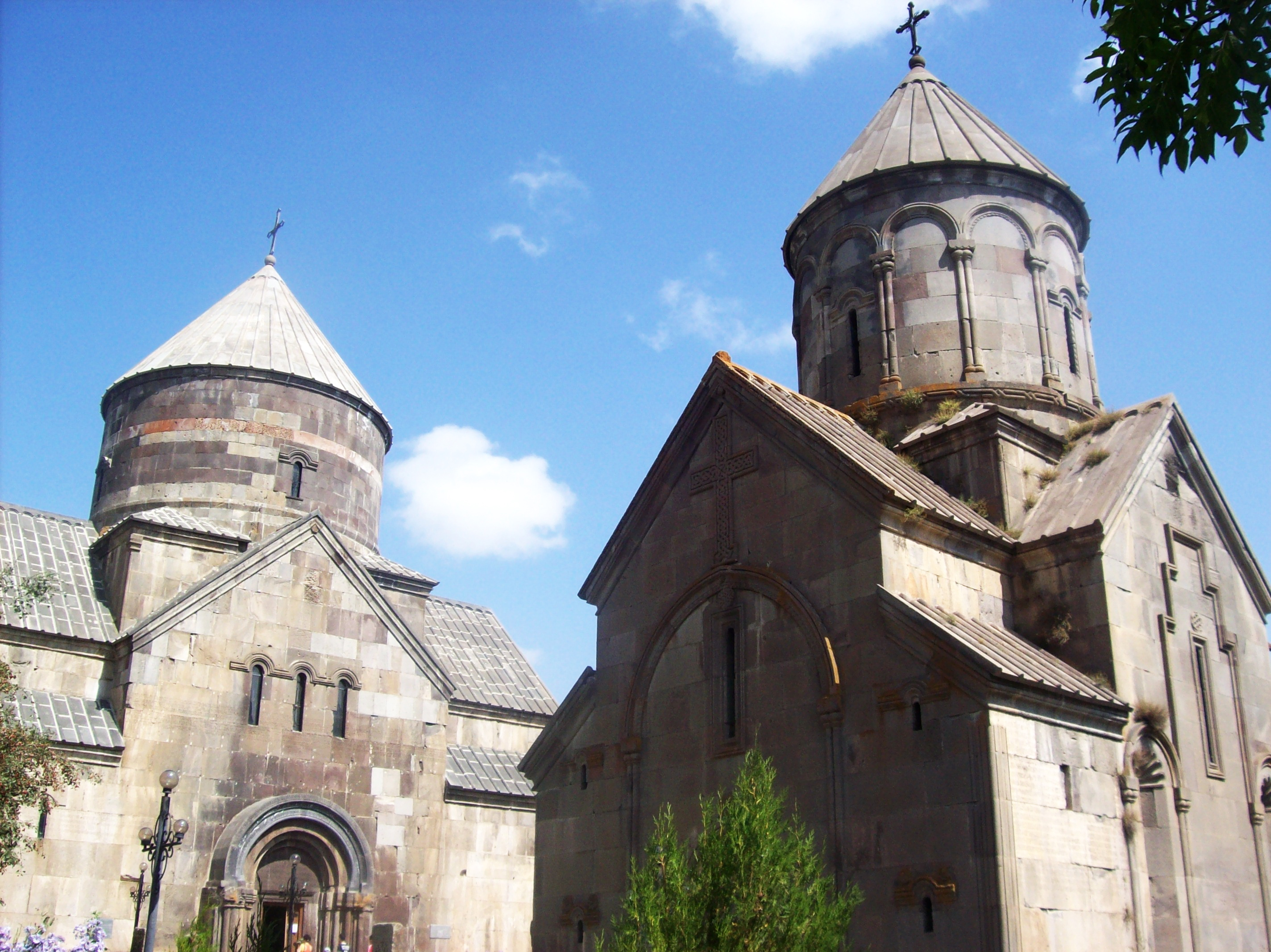
The Surp Grigor & Katoghike churches

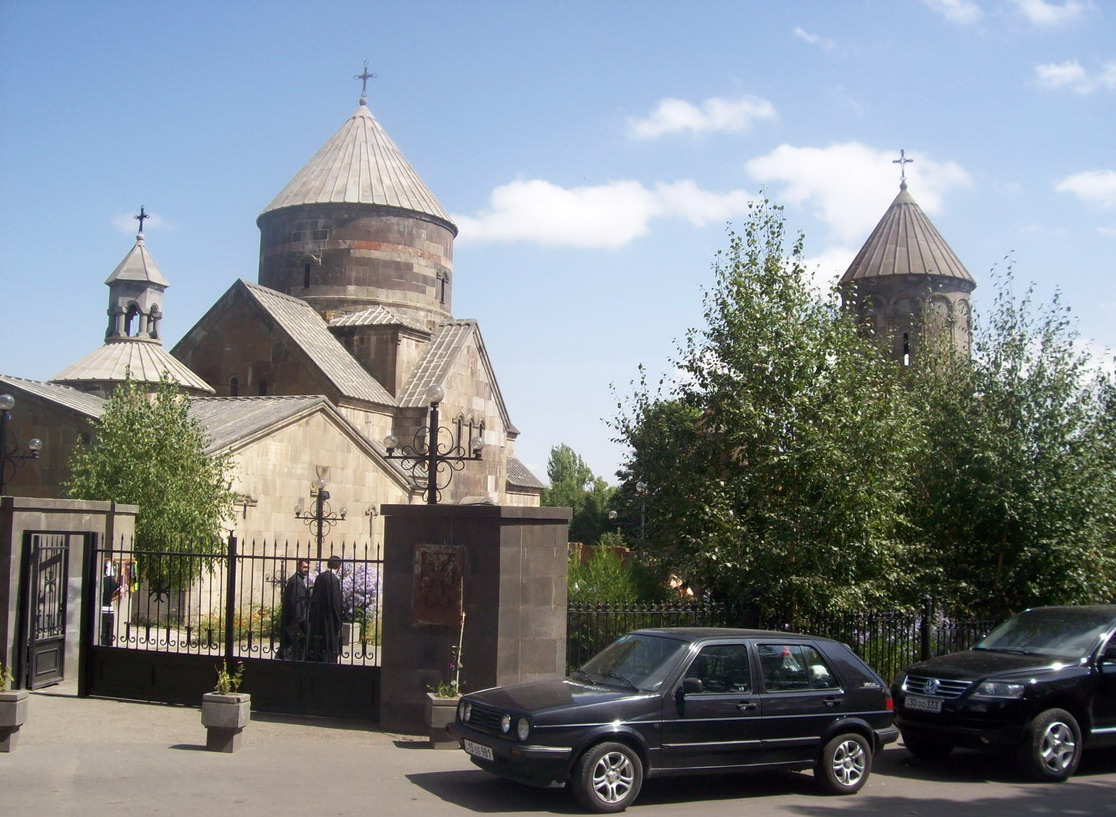
General view of the complex

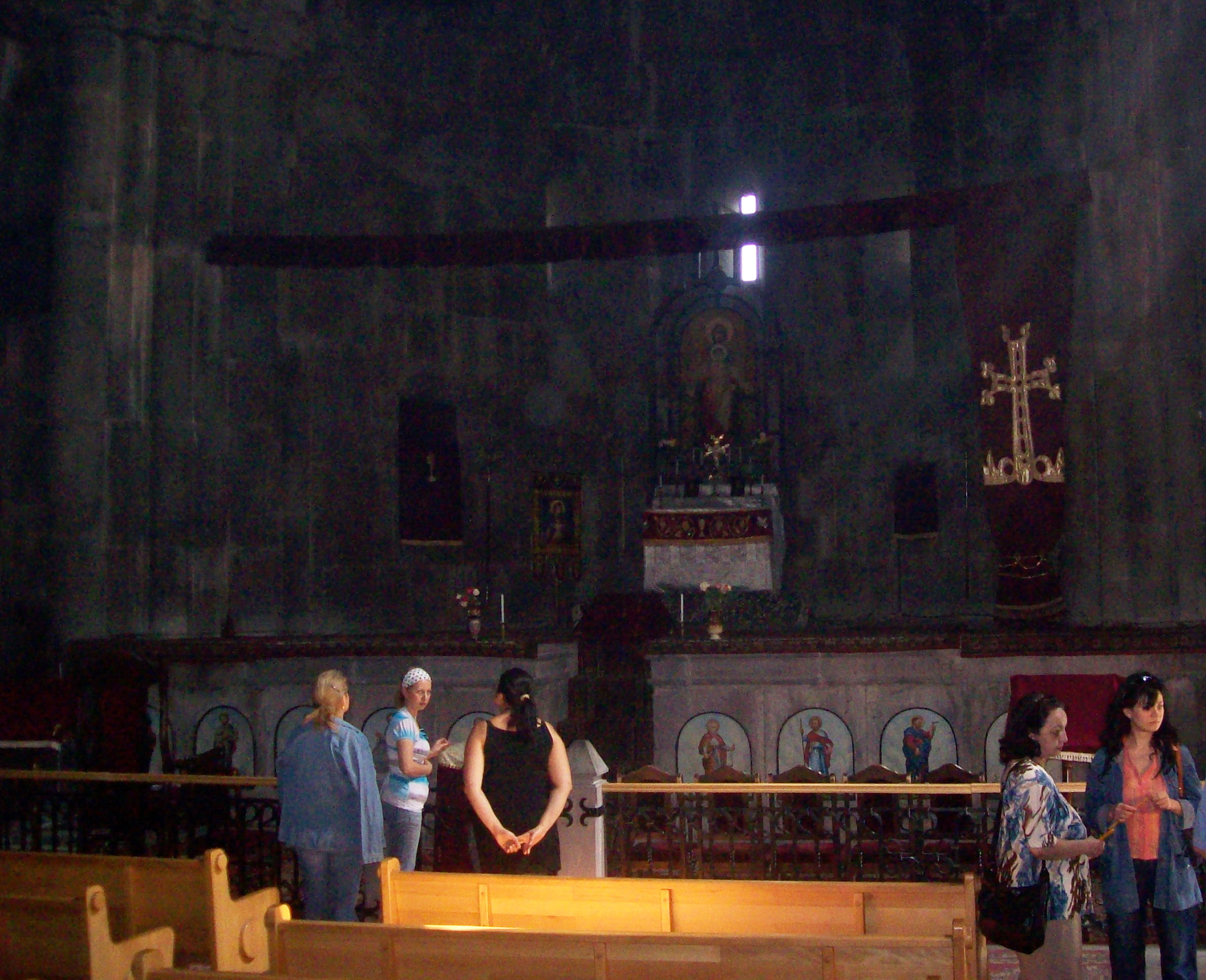
The altar of Surp Grigor church

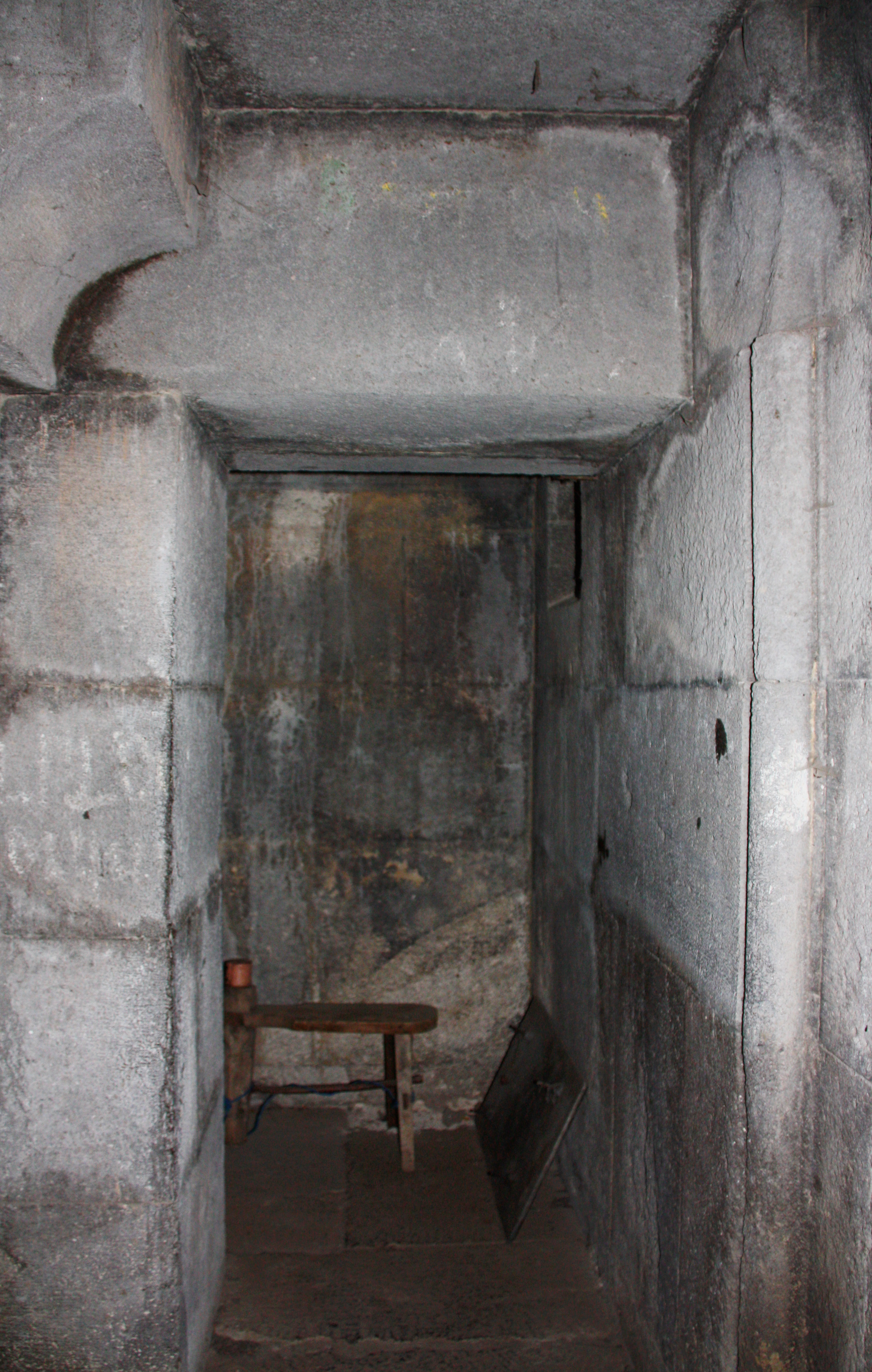
Monk's living quarters, Kecharis Monastery, Armenia

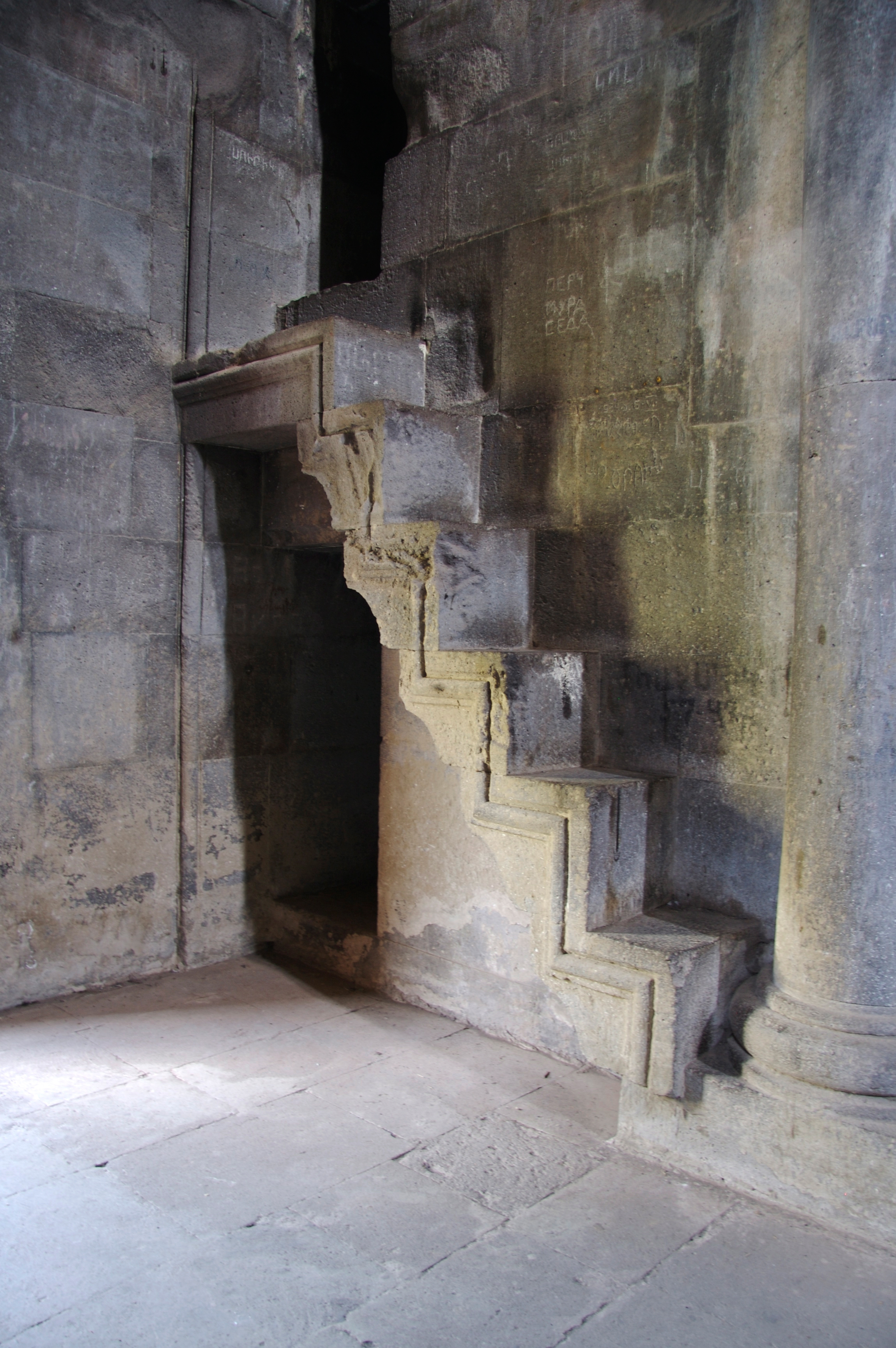
Kecharis Monastery, Stairs, Armenia

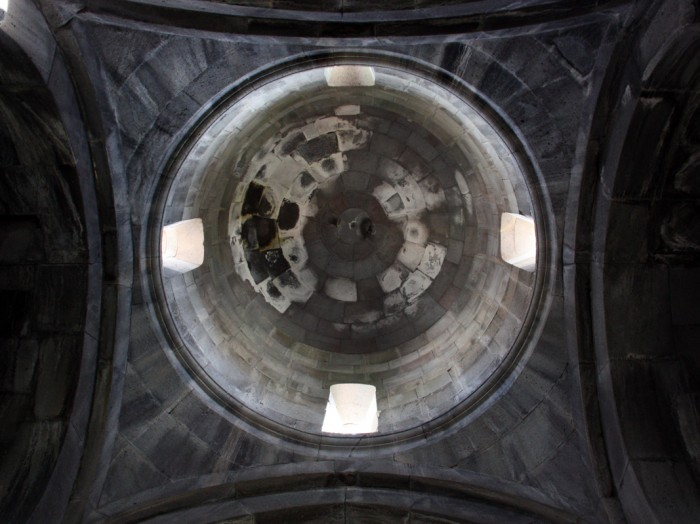
Kecharis Monastery Ceiling, Armenia

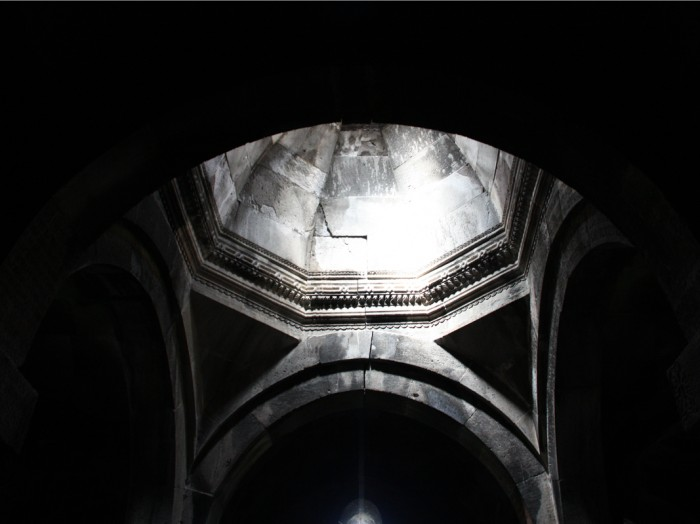
Kecharis Monastery, Ceiling, Armenia

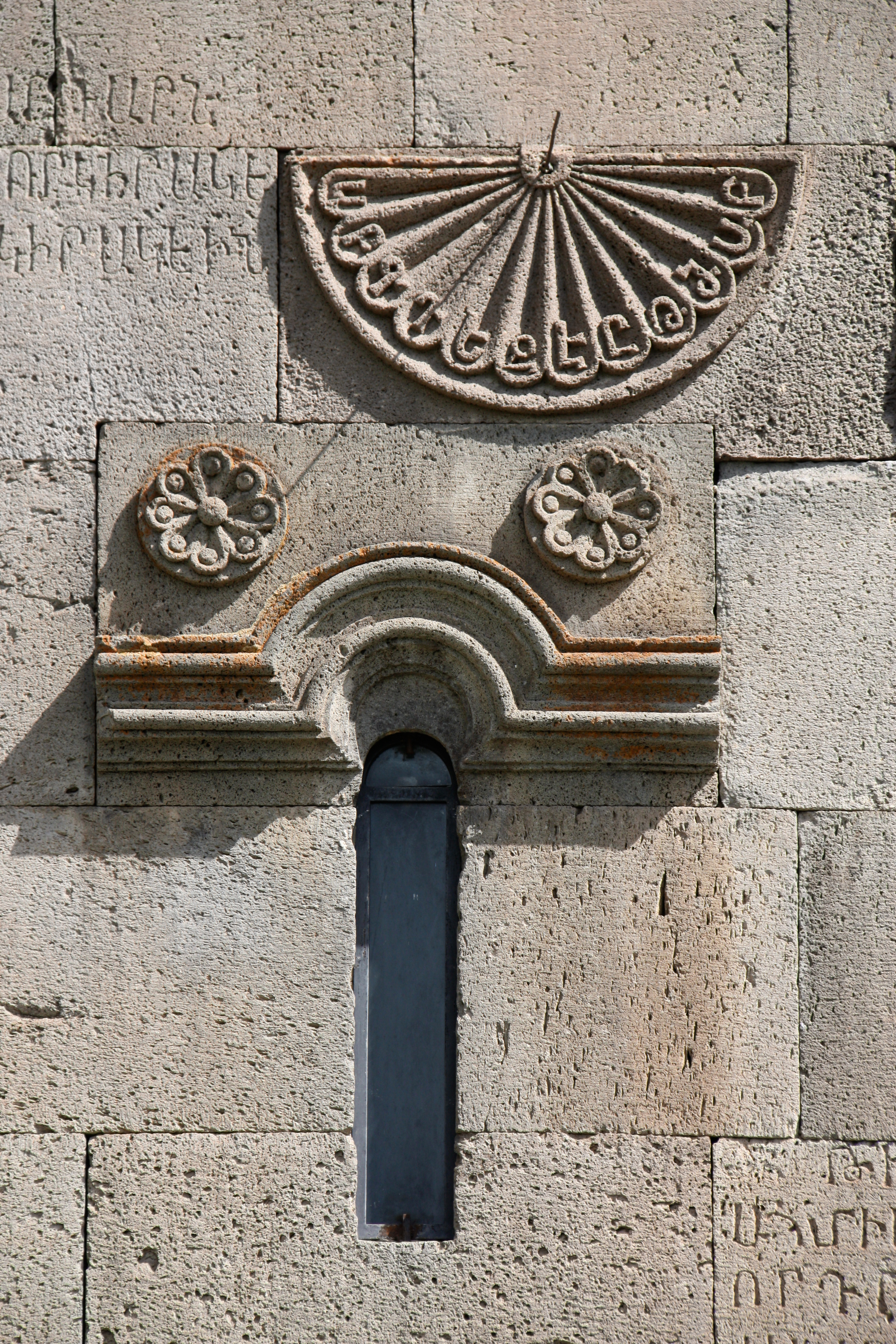
Kecharis Monastery Outside Wall Detail, Armenia

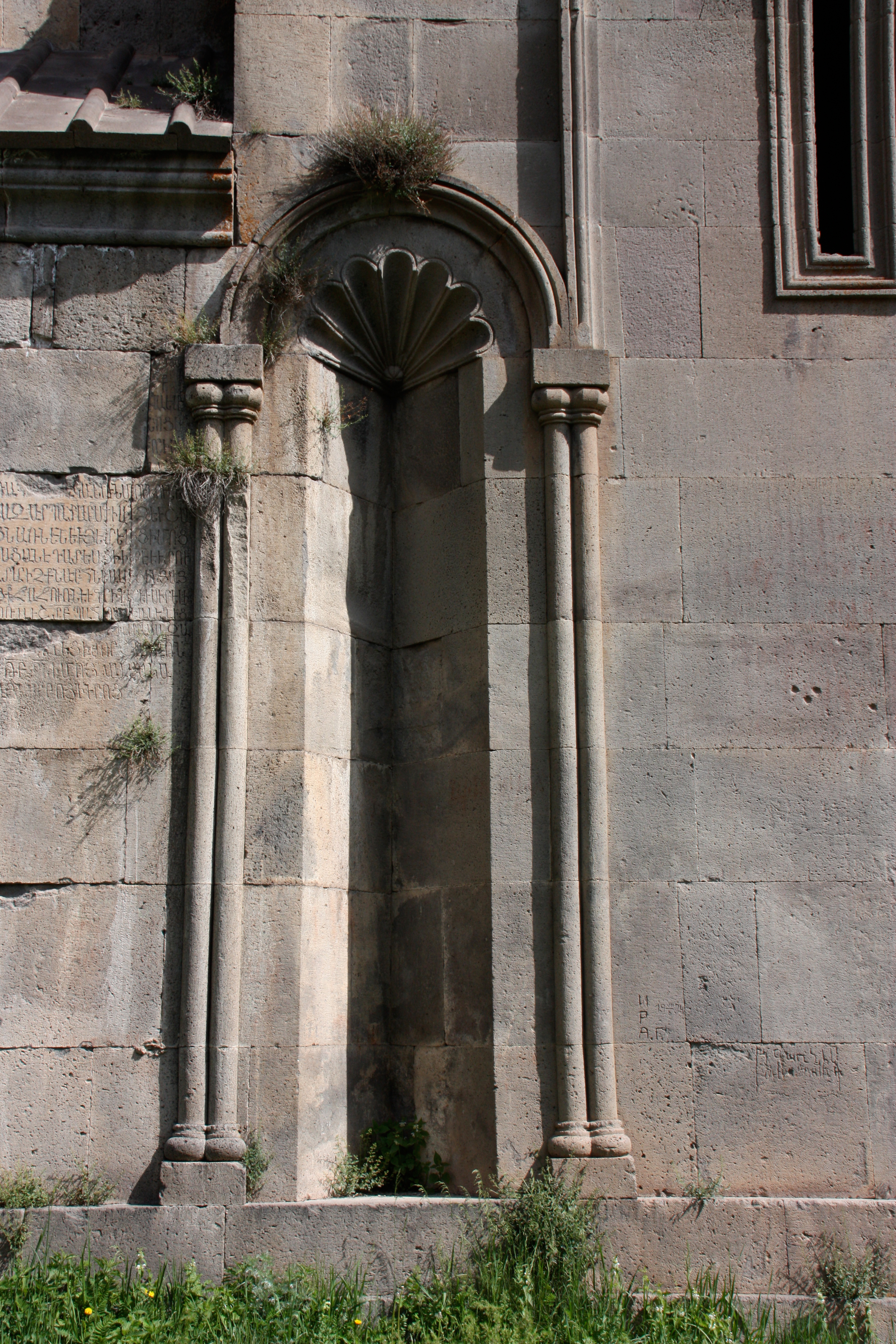
Kecharis Monastery, Outside Wall Detail, Armenia

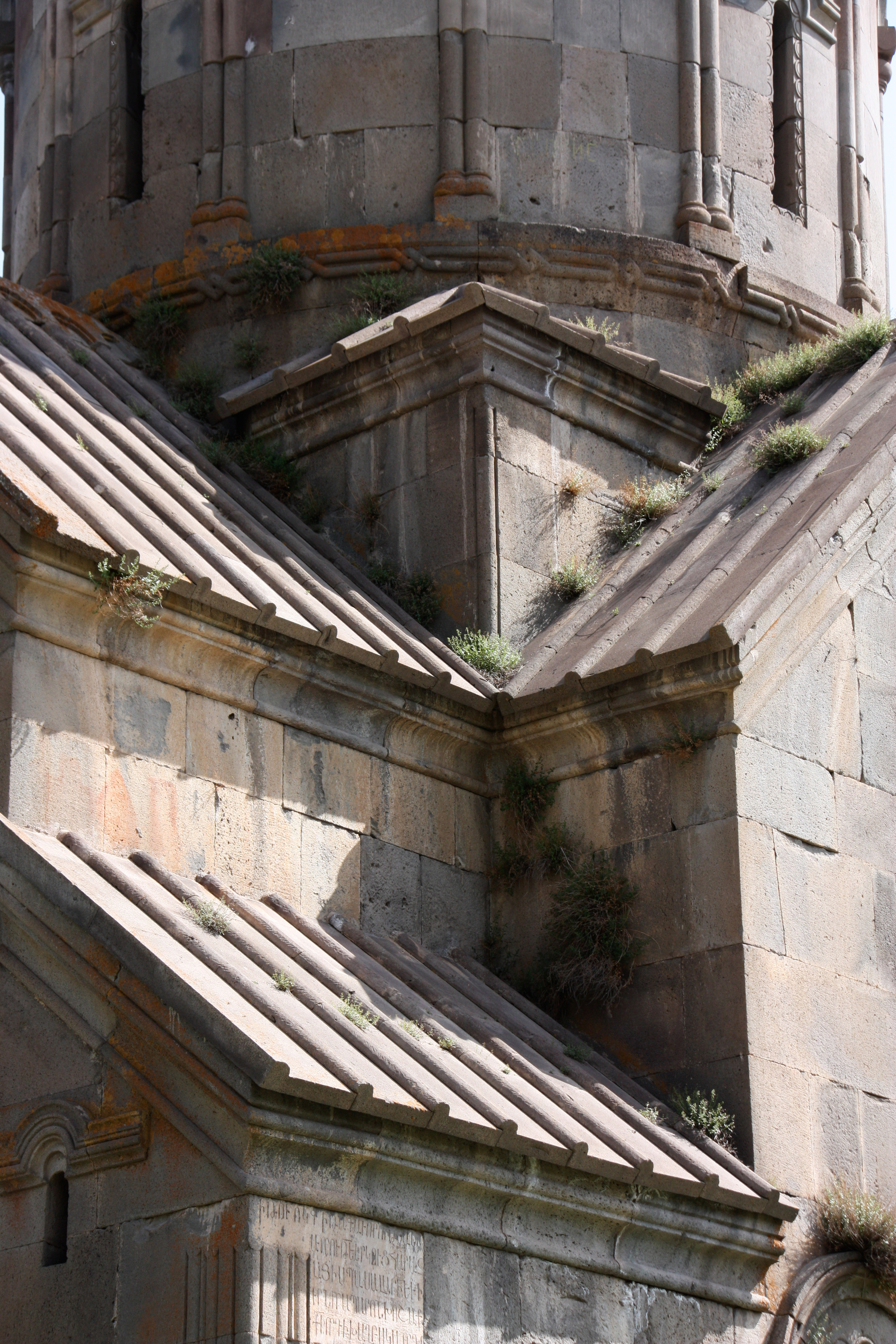
Kecharis Monastery Roof Detail, Armenia

== See also ==
- Diocese of Kotayk

== Sources ==
- "Architectural Ensembles of Armenia", by O. Khalpakhchian, published in Moscow by Iskusstvo Publishers in 1980.
- "Rediscovering Armenia Guidebook", by Brady Kiesling and Raffi Kojian, published online and printed in 2005.
