= Goght =

Goght Գողթ
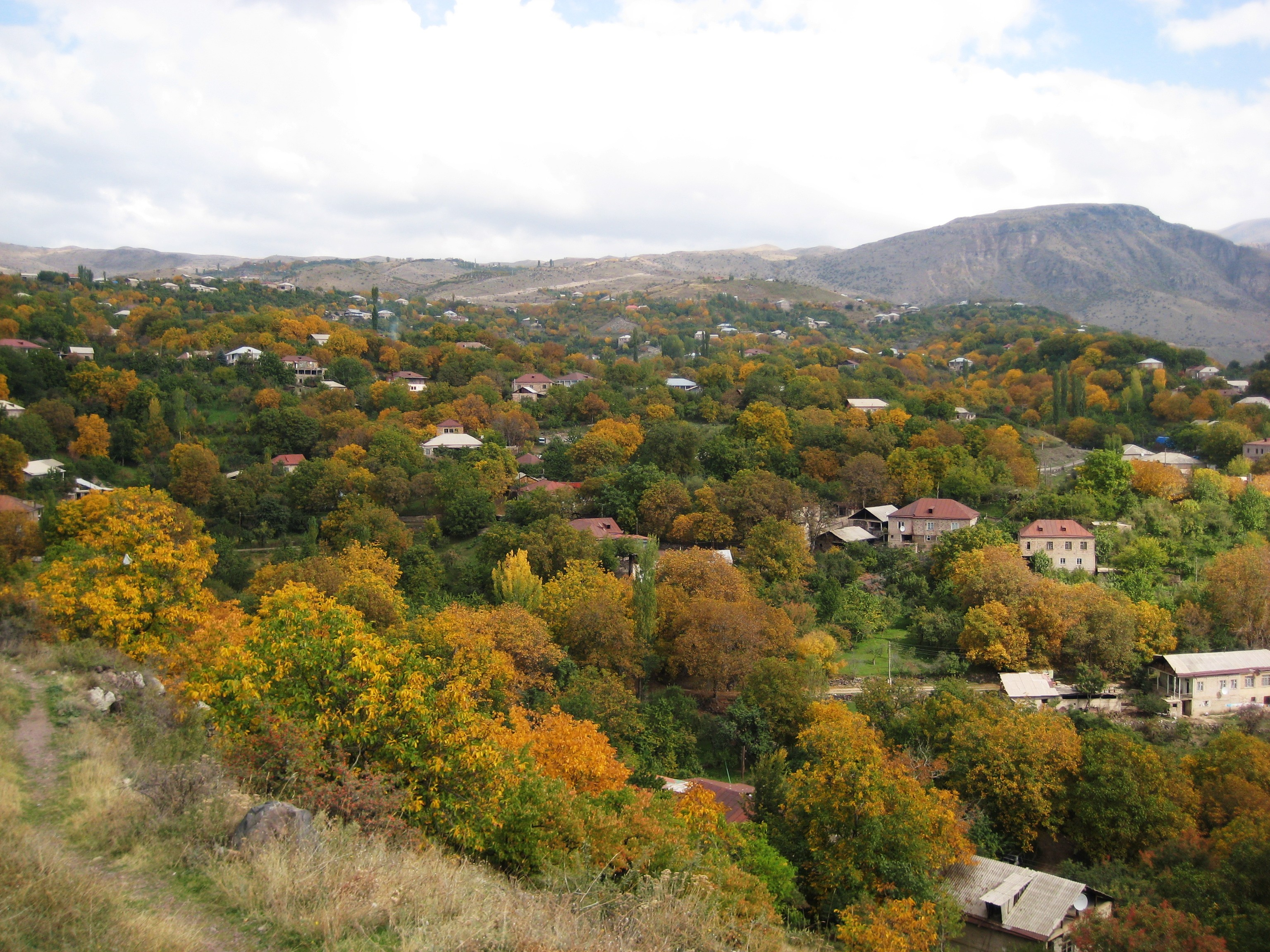
- The village of Goght, October 2009

- Location within Armenia
- Coordinates: 40°8′22″N 44°46′46″E
- Country: Armenia
- Marz: Kotayk
- First mentioned: 13th-century

Government
  - Mayor: Artavazd Hakobyan

Area
  - Total: 12.38 km^{2} (4.78 sq mi)
- Elevation: 1,600 m (5,200 ft)

Population (2011)
  - Total: 1,921
  - Density: 155.2/km^{2} (401.9/sq mi)
- Time zone: UTC+4 (GMT +4)

Goght (Armenian: Գողթ; formerly Goghot) is a village in the Kotayk Province of Armenia, located on the right bank of the upper-Azat River. It is known from 13th-century manuscripts as Goghot. It is located near Garni and sits along the road leading to Geghard Monastery. The village has a small ruined basilica from the 17th or 18th century located straight down a dirt road from the main square. Some khachkars are built into the exterior walls of the church, as well as at its altar. Goght sits overlooking a large gorge and upon a promontory on the other side is the 11th- to 13th-century monastery of Havuts Tar. It may be reached by foot from the town, but more easily from Garni via the Garni Gorge. The community has a school, kindergarten, house of culture, and a library. The local economy is heavily dependent on agriculture, based primarily on grain farming, orchard cultivation, and cattle-breeding.

== Gallery ==
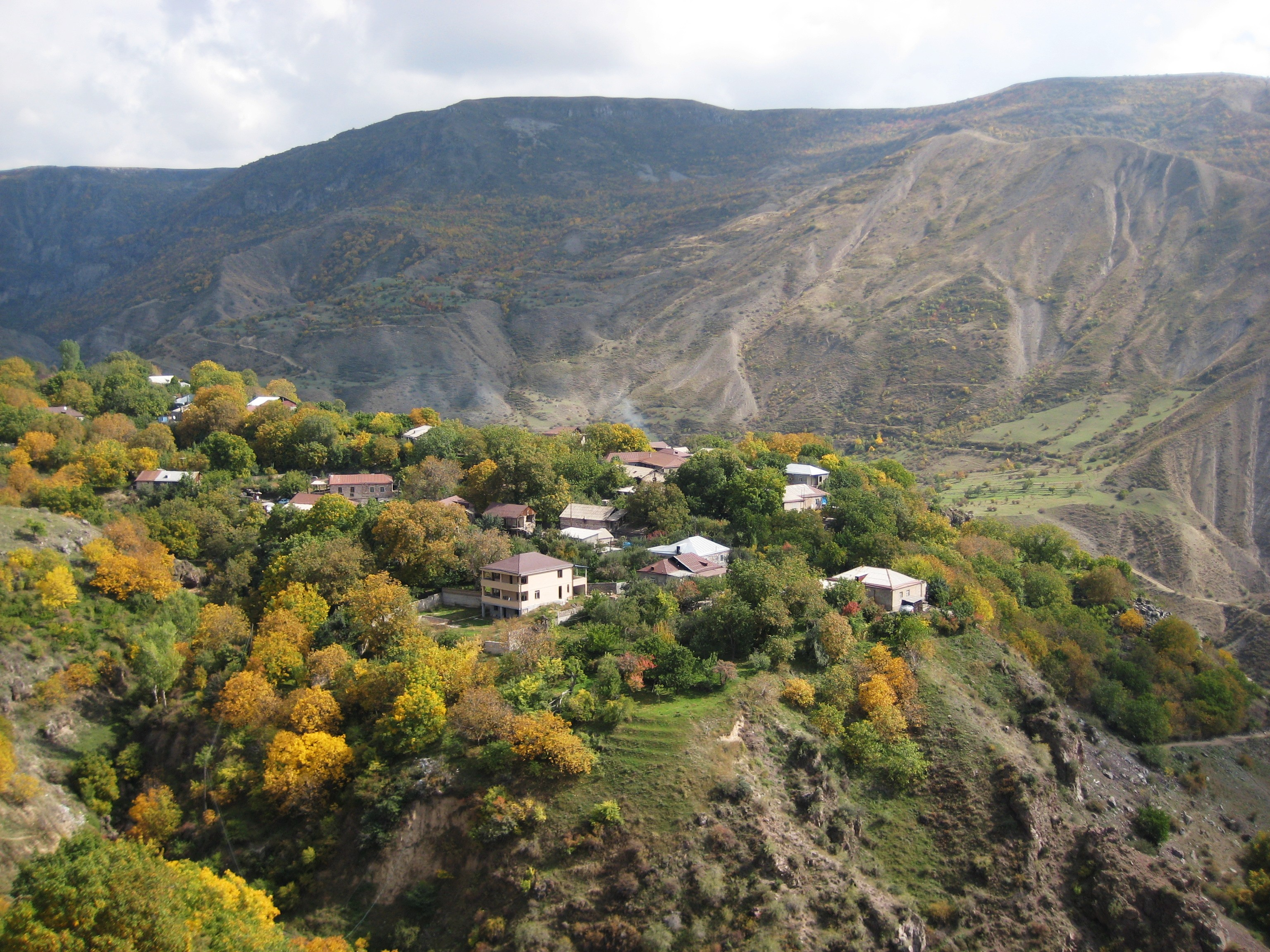
A portion of the village that sits along a ridge overlooking the gorge

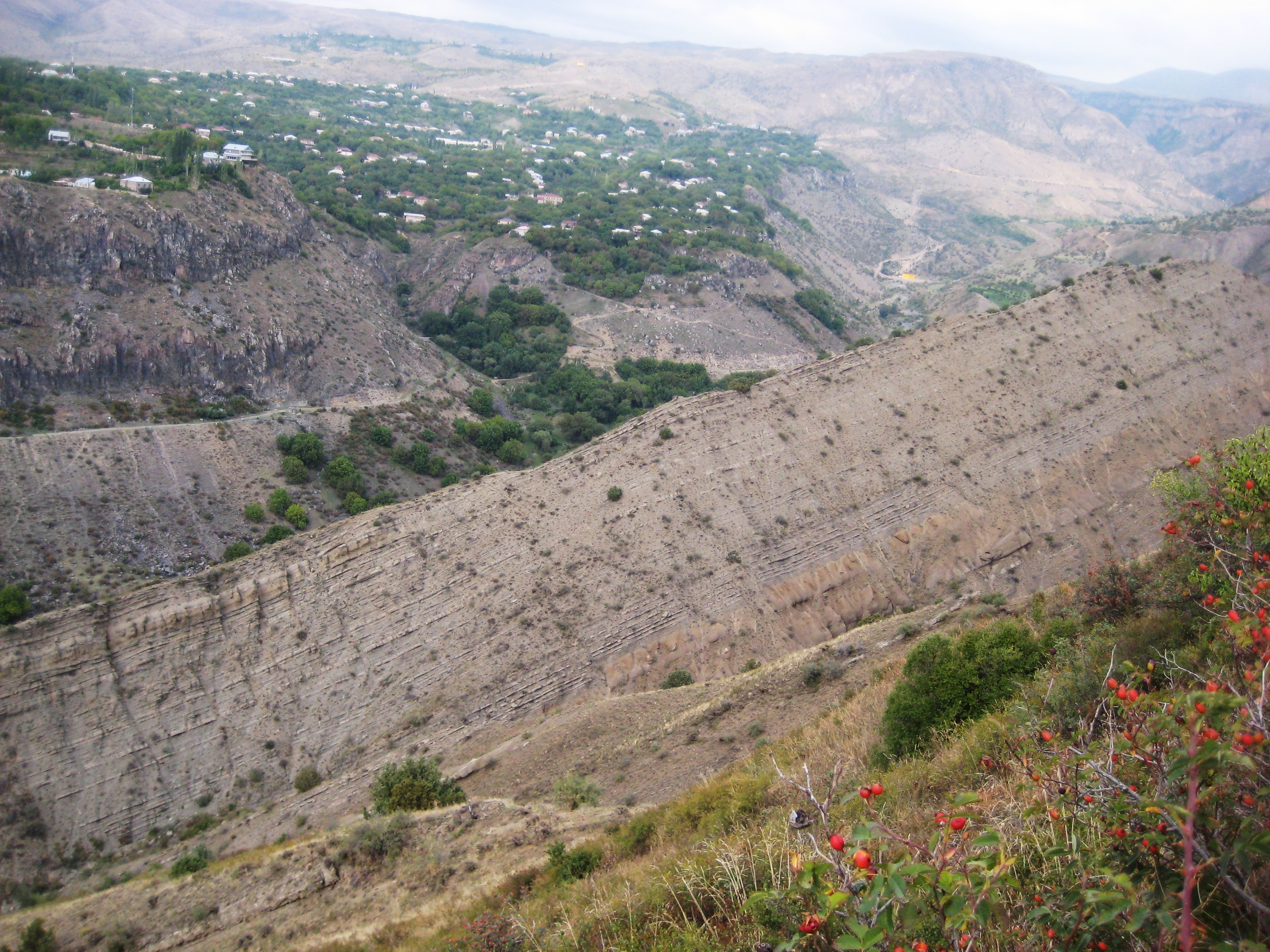
Goght as seen from Havuts Tar Monastery across the gorge

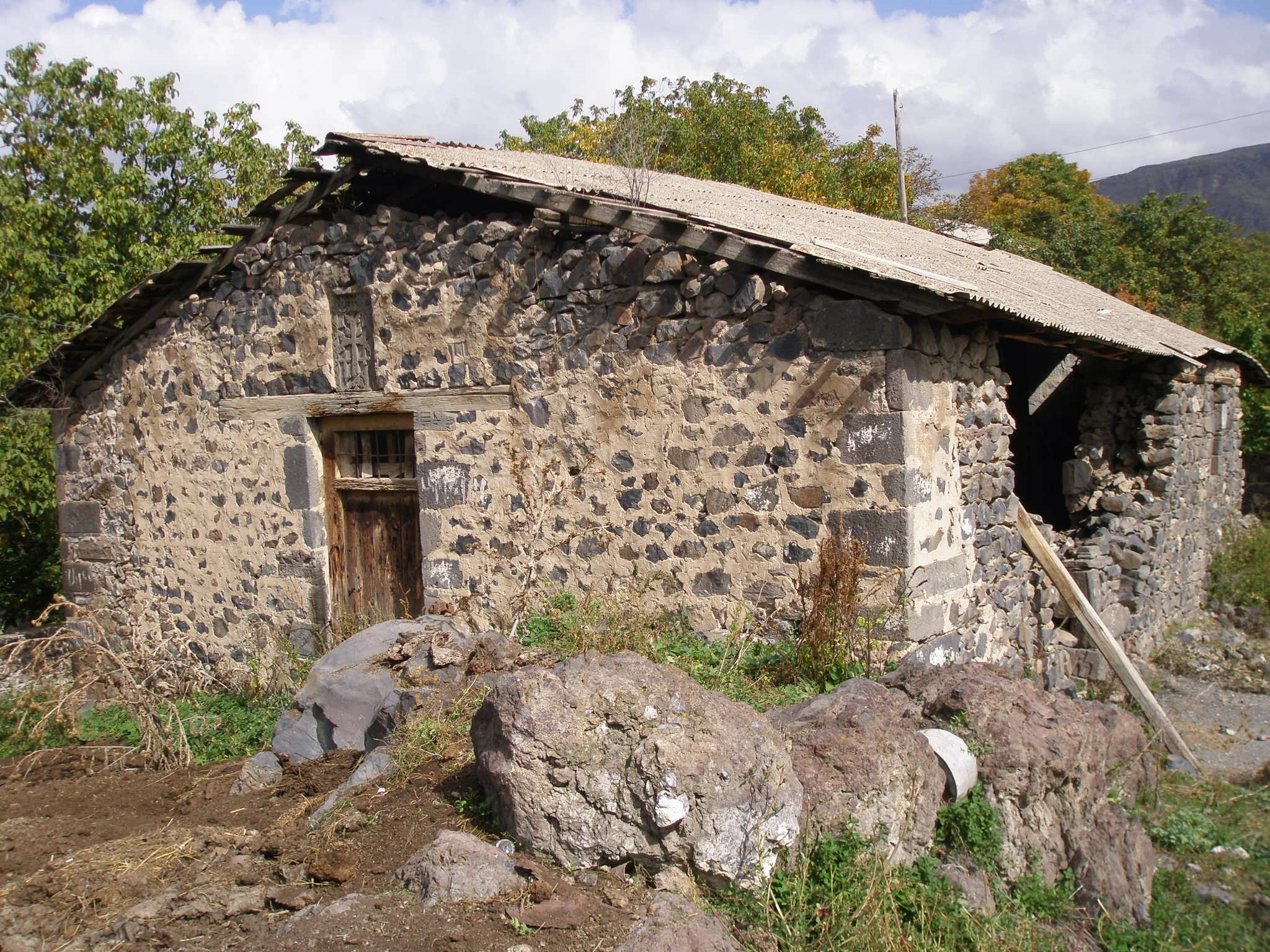
Village church

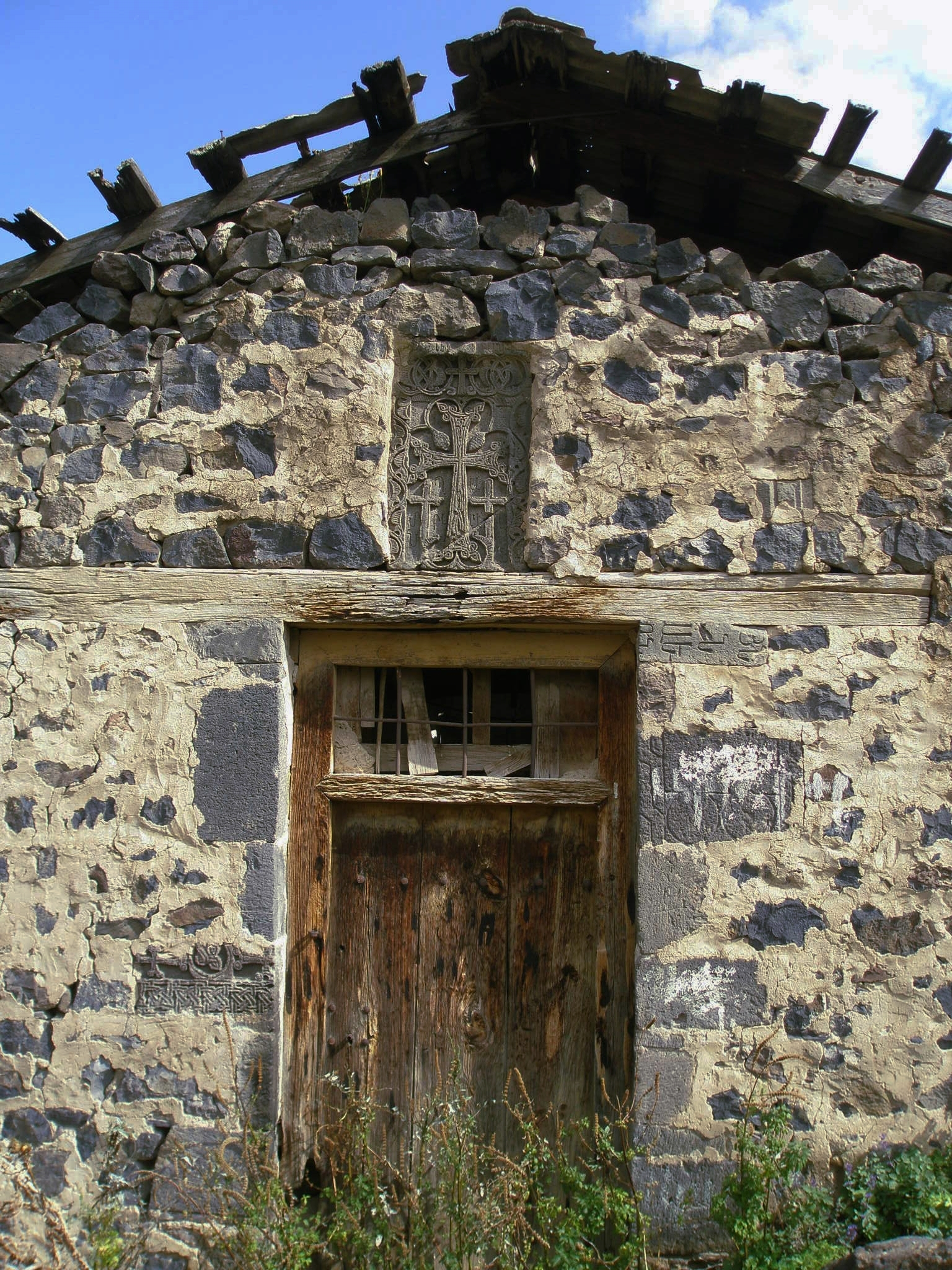
One of the doors leading into the village church

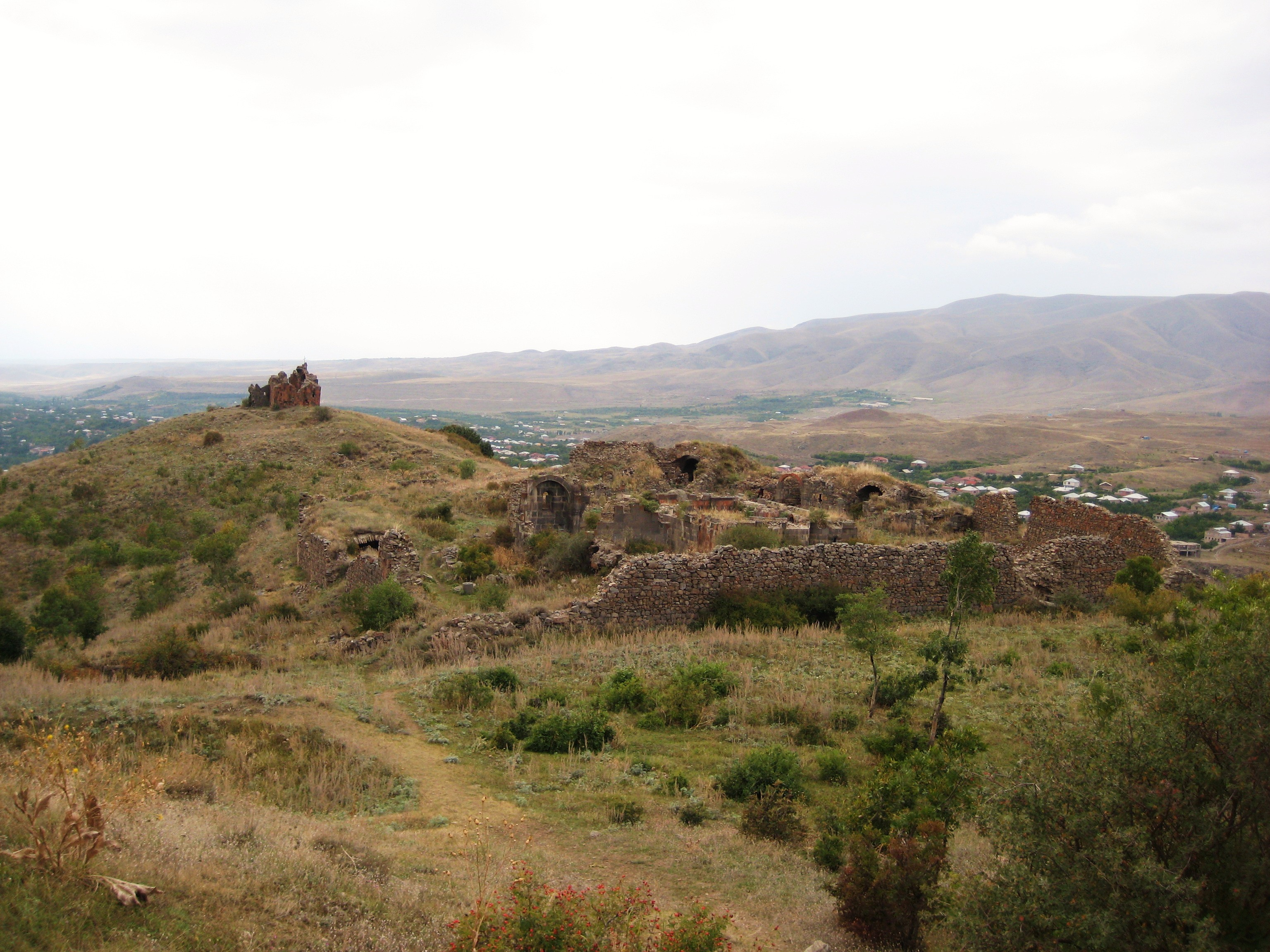
The Havuts Tar Monastic Complex located across the gorge from Goght

== See also ==
- Kotayk Province
