= Havuts Tar =

11th to 13th century walled monastery

Havuts Tar Monastery Հավուց Թառ Վանք
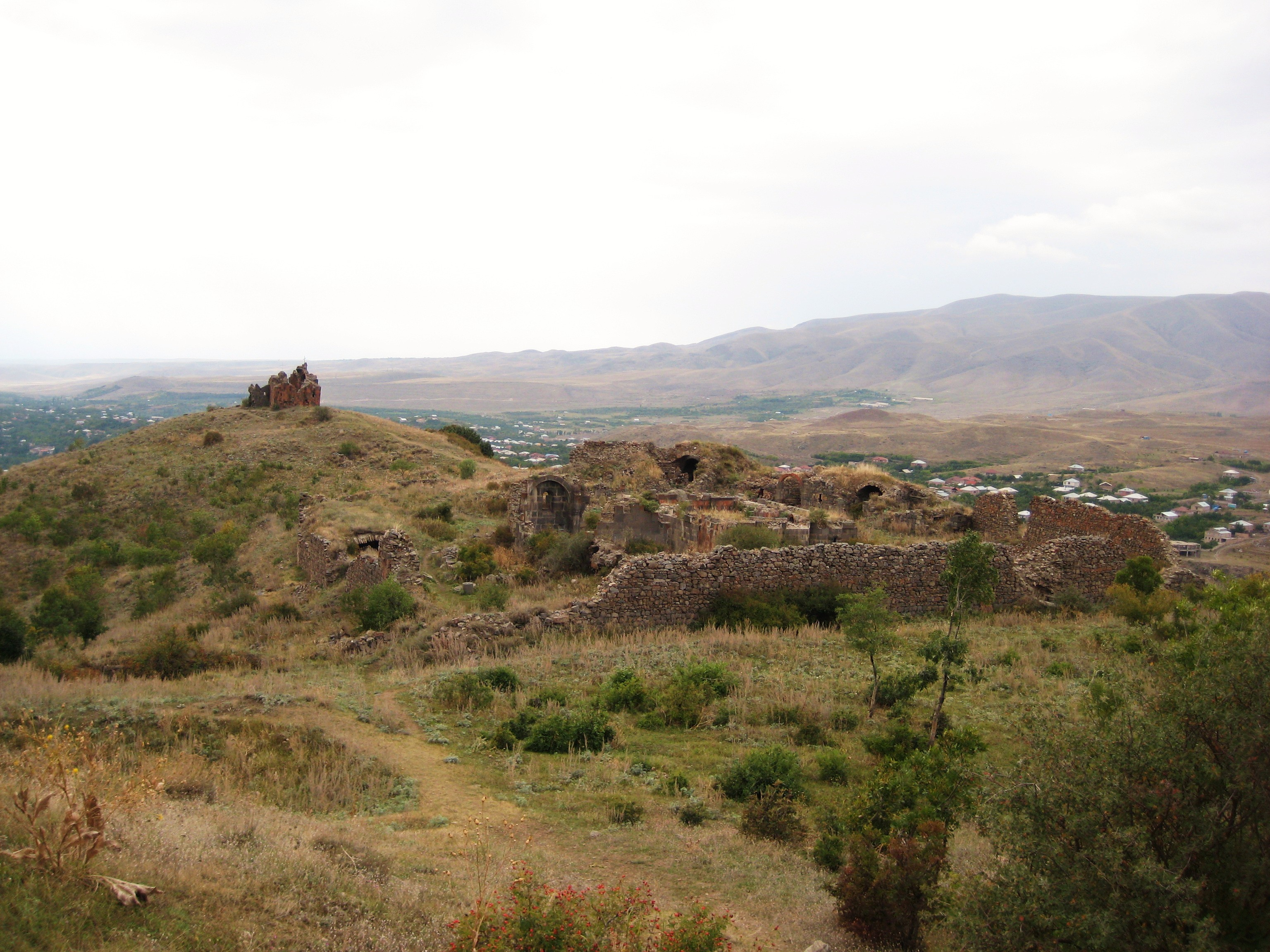
- The monastic complex of Havuts Tar.

- Location within Armenia

Religion
- Affiliation: Armenian Apostolic Church
- Ecclesiastical or organisational status: Inactive, ruins

Location
- Location: Near Goght and Garni, Kotayk Province, Armenia
- Coordinates: 40.122981°N 44.768874°E

Architecture
- Completed: 11th–13th centuries

Havuts Tar (Armenian: Հավուց Թառ Վանք; also Havuts Tar Vank; translates to the "All Savior Monastery") is an 11th to 13th century walled monastery, situated upon a promontory along the Azat River Valley across from the villages of Goght and Garni in the Kotayk Province of Armenia. It is easily reached via the Khosrov State Reserve (which it is situated within), located across the Garni Gorge. The Havuts Tar Trail leads directly from the east side (left) of the reserve entrance to the monastic complex. An alternate route/shortcut to the monastery can be found at the end of the main road along the Azat River and just past the fish hatchery ponds.

It takes approximately thirty minutes to reach the ruins of the monastery via the Havuts Tar Trail. A couple of khachkars can be found midway along the trail as it forks left upon a very low mound. Also, a short distance from the monastery (clearly visible oh a hill in the background) in a small field to the left, is a large khachkar and a small ruined monument. Following the trail a little further leads to the fortified walls and ruins of the monastic complex. Just before entering the monastery, a small path leads up a hill to the east and through a semi-wooded area. At the end of the path are the ruins of a small chapel with two large khachkars to the left, and a third to the right.

== History ==
The majority of the Havuts Tar monastic complex was constructed between the 12th and 14th centuries. After having been badly damaged by a large earthquake in 1679, the monastery was effectively abandoned in the years that followed. Portions of the complex were rebuilt in the early 18th century by the Catholicos Astvatsatur Hamadantsi, and some restoration efforts took place in the early 20th century.

The monastery is known to have had a brief visit during October 1734 by Abraham Kretatsi during the time while he was serving the Catholicos Abraham II. He brought a monk as a guide and spent two days there while on his pilgrimage to a number of churches and monasteries across Armenia. His visit to Havuts Tar is mentioned the following brief passage:

In the morning, taking one of the monks as my guide, I went to Havuts Tar, that is, the All Savior Monastery, where I spent two days.

== Monastic complex ==
The eastern outcrop at Havuts Tar is surrounded by a fortified wall, constructed of roughly hewn stones that are cemented into place. There are some khachkars and other decorative stones that were used as accents and at times as rubble infill for the walls. Access to the monastery is through an arched entryway at the southeast corner that connects to the main trail. Within its confines are two churches positioned in the center (the main church with its surrounding walls intact and the ruins of another adjacent to it), the ruins of a gavit to the main church, monastic buildings situated along a section of the northern and southern interior walls, vaulted guest chambers, and a large underground chamber that likely served as a manuscript library at the south wall.

The main church is notable for the decorative relief that is found on its exterior and interior walls. There is a single entry to the church from the west through a highly decorated façade that utilizes burnt orange and dark gray tuff to highlight its unique architectural details. A similar technique is used on the interior as well. Carvings of birds adorn the tympanum above the western portal, the southern exterior wall, and one of the niches in the interior. Construction of a new church (adjacent to the north) began in 1772, but the work was never completed.

Even though much of the site is in ruins, there are still numerous inscriptions and interesting carvings to be found all over the complex. Just beyond the monastery's walls along the path that leads to S. Amenaprkich Church and the western outcrop, are the remnants of stone foundations and depressions in the earth of other structures.

== Amenaprkich Church ==
On the western outcrop upon a hill overlooking the valley below is a structure that is often referred to as Amenaprkich Church (which can be seen from across the gorge all the way to Garni Temple) with a small number of graves nearby. The historical accounts of Mkhitar Airivanatsy mention that Gevorg Marzpetuni had originally built the church in the 10th century. According to inscriptions at the site, it was later rebuilt in 1013 by Grigor Magistros Pahlavuni, son of Vasak Pahlavuni. Pahlavuni was also the founder of Kecharis Monastery in Tsaghkadzor. However, some sources indicate that Amenaprkich is the main church in the eastern outcrop.

Amenaprkich Church is cross-dome in plan, where the cylindrical drum and dome are collapsed. A single entry leads into the church from the west with prayer rooms at either side to the north and the south. There are additional prayer rooms adjacent to both sides of the raised altar at the eastern wall. A single window in each of these rooms allowed light to enter the space. The apse has two small decorative niches and a window. Windows are also at each of the other wings. Vaulting and a pendentive above the northern wing that had once helped to support the drum and dome are still intact. Pendentives each contained decorative relief depicting knot patterns in their bottom corners. Exterior walls are constructed in an alternating checkerboard pattern of burnt orange and dark gray tuff. The structure was constructed with two vertical niches at the eastern wall to provide overall strength and stability, as well as increase its resistance to collapse during earthquakes. A number of inscriptions can be seen at the southern and western exterior walls.

The ruin of a small vaulted church constructed at a later date of grey basalt is attached adjacent to Amenaprkich's southern exterior wall. A large portion of the adjoining structure has since collapsed and lay at the base of the hill below. There are some striking similarities between the decorative relief as seen upon the aforementioned church and that of the 12th-century Mashtots Hayrapet Church in Garni. It is highly probable that one had influenced the other.

== Gallery ==
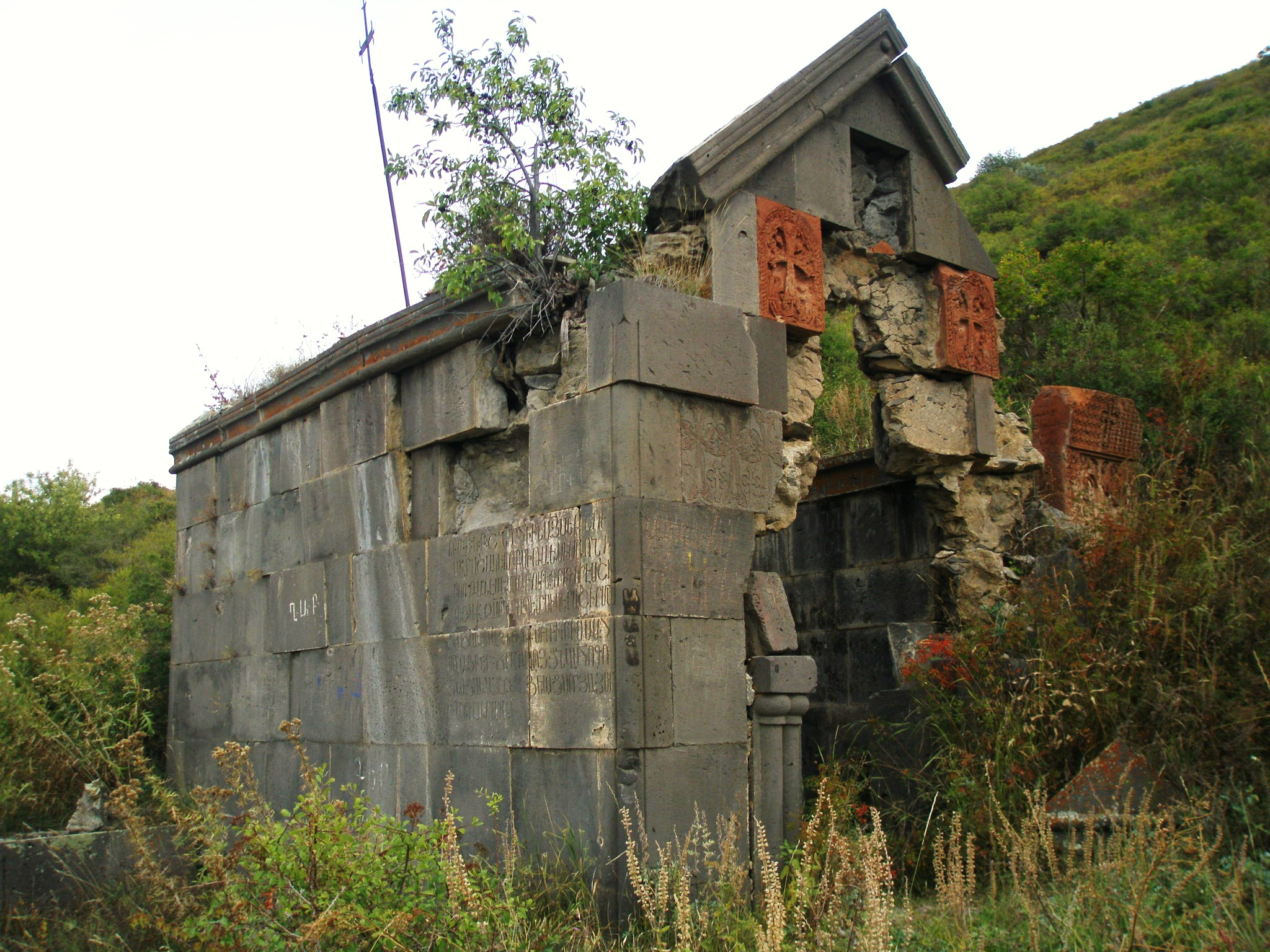
Chapel located near Havuts Tar.

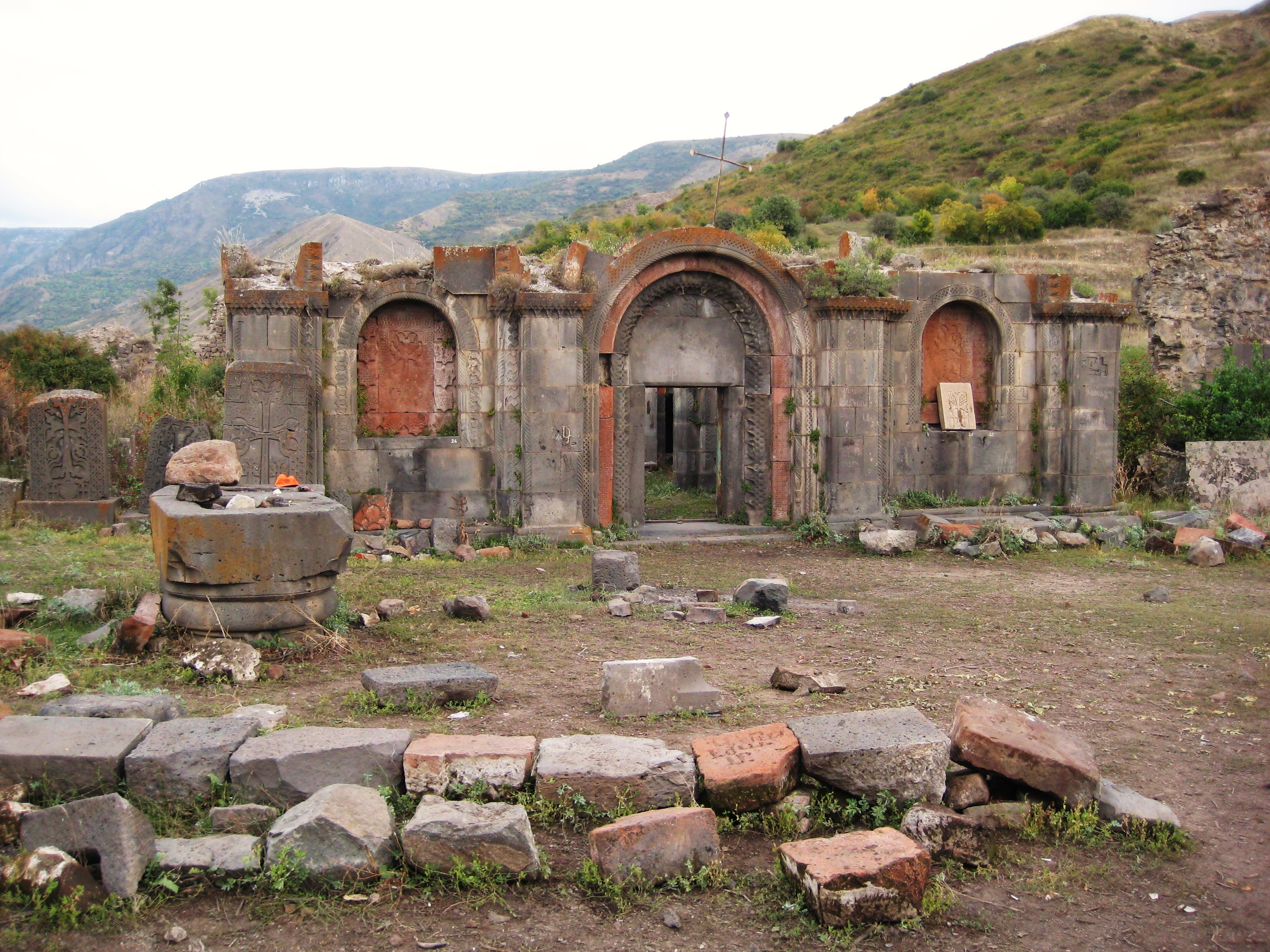
Church within the walls of the complex.

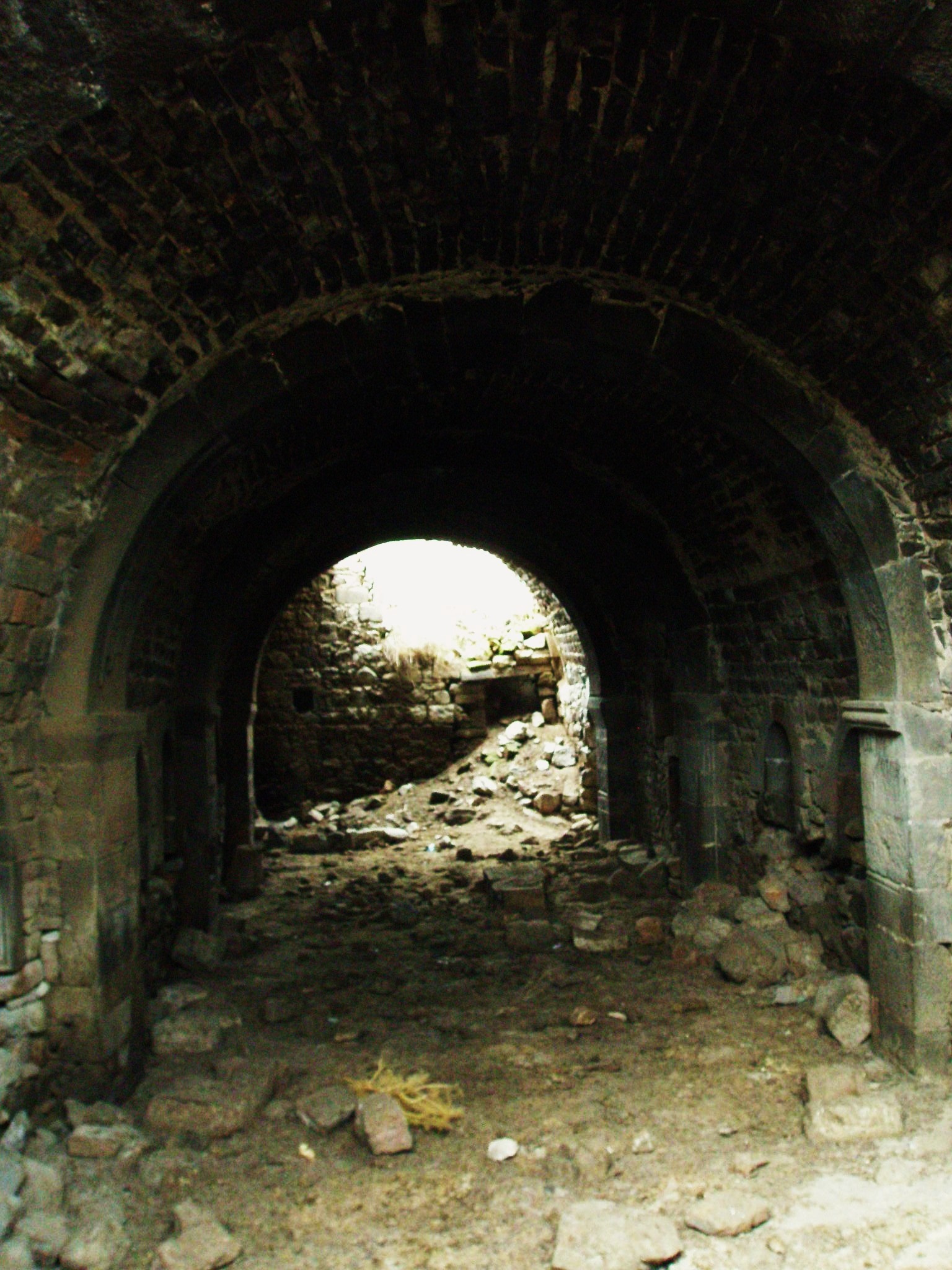
Underground chamber in the complex.

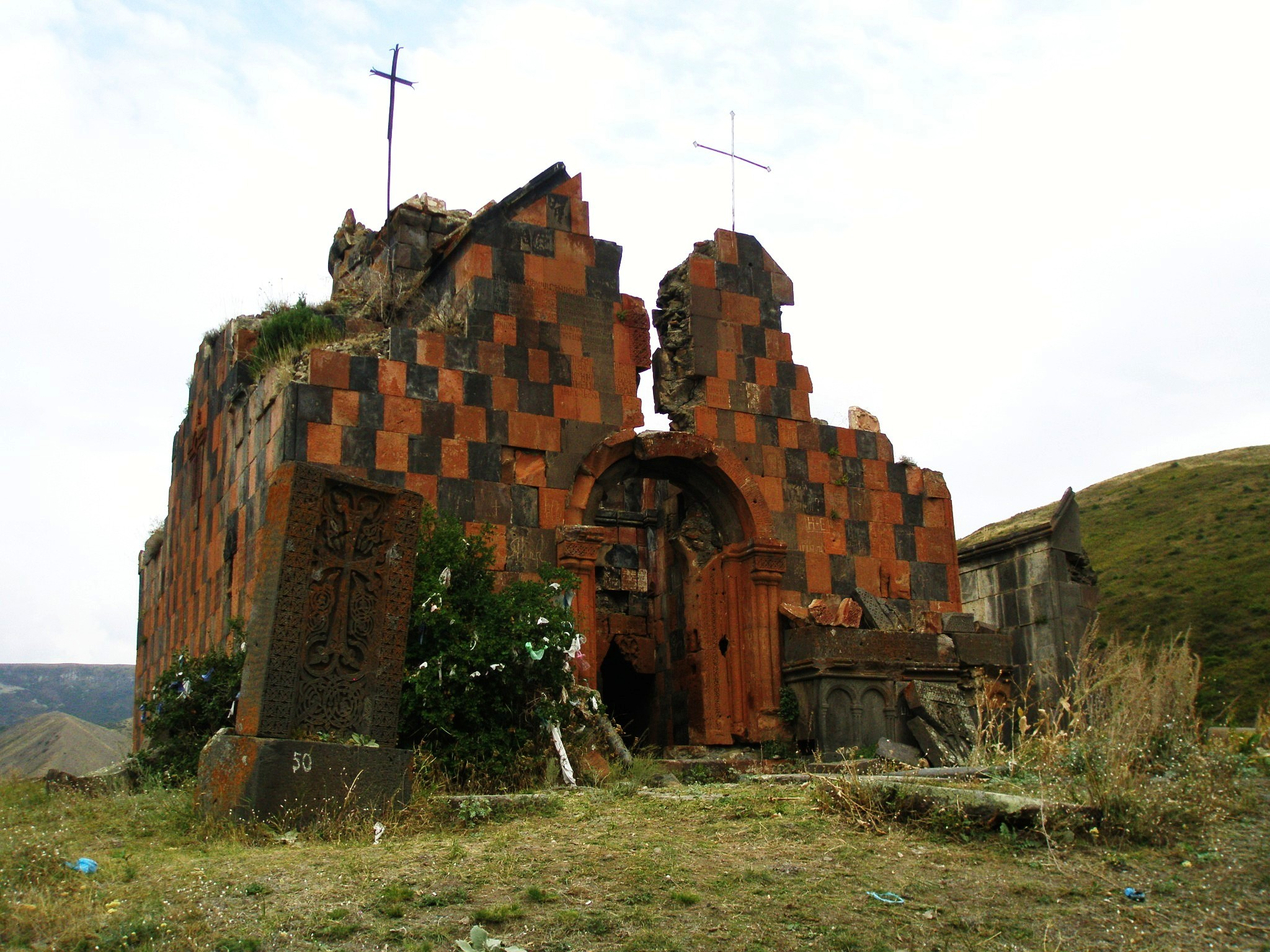
Amenaprkich Church upon the western outcrop.

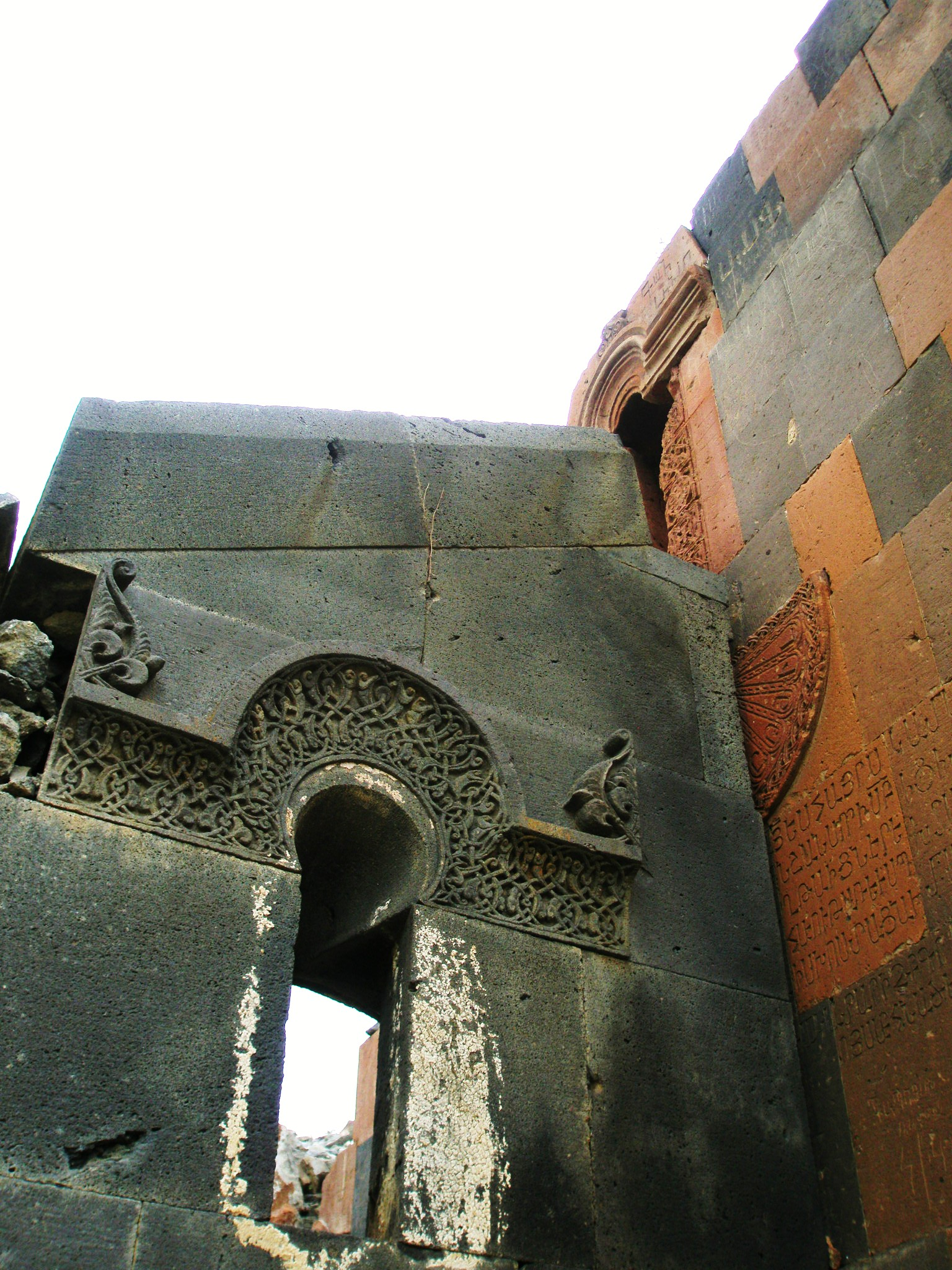
Detail of Amenaprkich Church and structure adjacent.

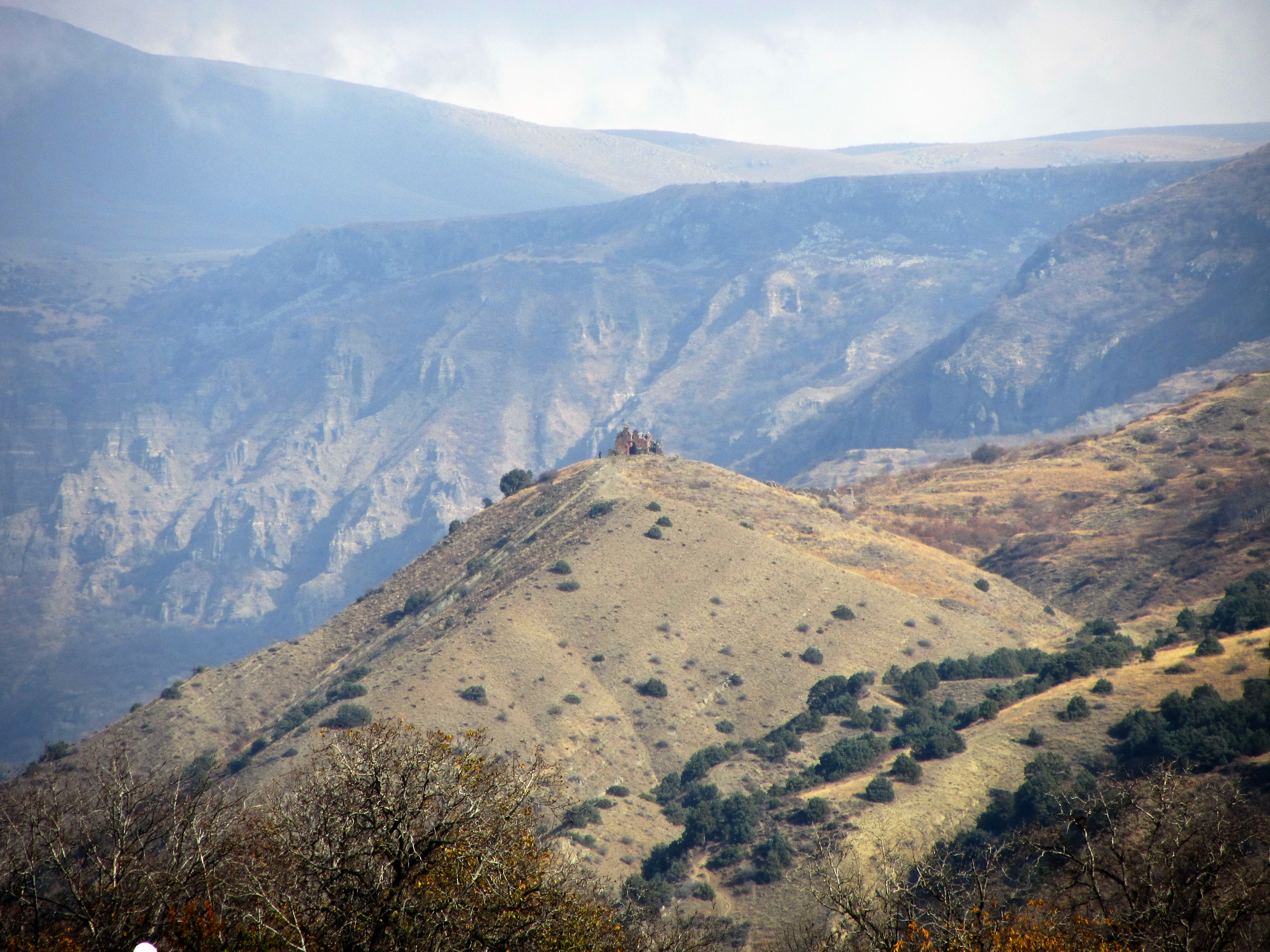
Havuts Tar, view from Garni Temple

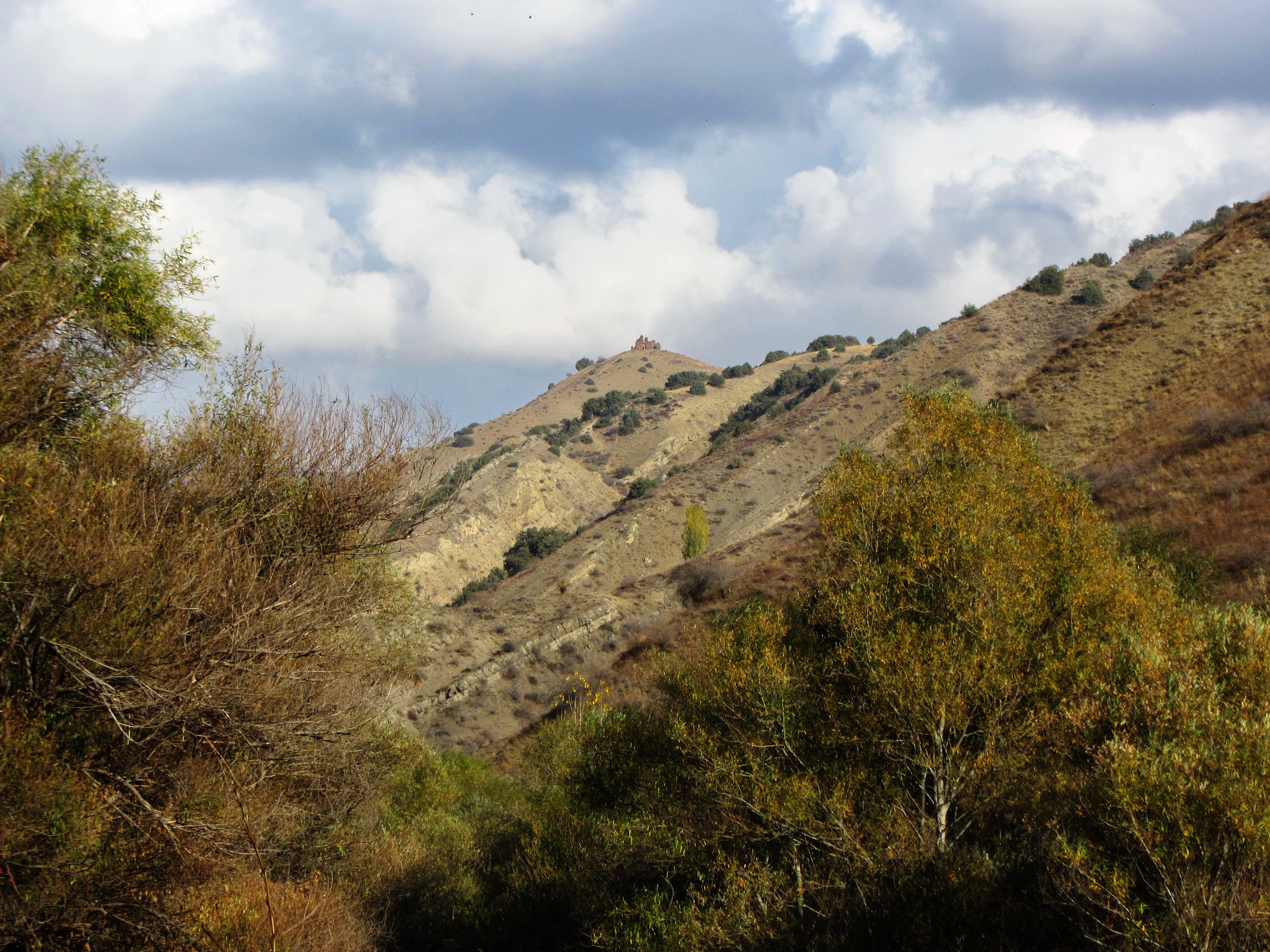
Havuts Tar, view from Azat river (Garni) Gorge
