= John of Würzburg (disambiguation) =

John of Würzburg (fl. 1160s) was a German priest, pilgrim and writer.

John of Würzburg may also refer to:

- Johann von Würzburg (fl. c. 1300), German poet
- John I of Egloffstein, bishop of Würzburg (r. 1400–1411)
- John II of Brunn, bishop of Würzburg (r. 1411–1440)
- John III of Grumbach, bishop of Würzburg (r. 1455–1466)
