= Libellus de locis sanctis =

12th-century guidebook for Palestine

The Libellus de locis sanctis ("Little Book of the Holy Places") is a 12th-century Latin guide book and travelogue of Palestine designed for the use of Christian pilgrims to the Holy Places. It "stands out" from the mass of medieval guide books "for its literary and informative qualities".

== Author ==
About the author of the Libellus nothing is known for certain besides what he says about himself. He was a German monk named Dietrich or Theoderich (Latin: Theodericus) who visited Palestine himself around 1172. He was probably a Rhinelander, since he travelled with a certain Adolf from Cologne and he was familiar with the Palatine Chapel at Aachen. He may have been from Hirsau Abbey. He is often identified with the Dietrich to whom John of Würzburg dedicated his Descriptio terrae sanctae, another guide to Palestine. John travelled to the Holy Land shortly before Dietrich in the 1160s. He is also sometimes identified with Dietrich of Hohenburg, who became the bishop of Würzburg in 1223. There is nothing to connect him to the two known Dietrichs of late 12th-century Würzburg, the provosts of Werdea and Onolsbach.

== Itinerary and description ==
Although Dietrich is an eyewitness for much of what he describes in the Libellus, he also makes use of other eyewitness reports and of written sources to round out his account. He used as a source the same compendium as used by John of Würzburg. In his introduction, he gives his work a spiritual purpose: to help bring Christ to mind for those who cannot see the Holy Places themselves and thereby to love and pity him, bringing themselves closer to heaven.

Dietrich's pilgrimage can be dated to between 1171 and 1173, during the reign of King Amalric of Jerusalem, when the Holy Places were under Christian control. It began in Acre during March or April. From there he took the road to Jerusalem, Jericho and the river Jordan. He went back by the same route and was in Acre preparing to embark on the Wednesday of Easter Week. He may have made a detour to visit Nazareth, Tiberias and Mount Tabor, but his description of the Sea of Galilee is very confused. His description of the Church of the Holy Sepulchre indicates that he was there during the renovations financed by the Emperor Manuel I Komnenos. He is also the earliest source to mention the Sultan's Pool, then a newly constructed cistern.

The skill and detail of Dietrich's architectural descriptions has led to the suggestion that he was an ecclesiastical architect. He clearly had knowledge of construction techniques and building materials, and his descriptions are clear. The Libellus is an important source for the art, architecture and agriculture of the Kingdom of Jerusalem on the eve of its fall. Dietrich shows less interest in miracles and wonders, but does provide a first-hand account of the coming of the Holy Fire. Although "he directs no sarcasm against men of other faiths", he does show anti-Jewish prejudice and records being frightened by some local "Saracens" shouting in Arabic as they worked in a field.

== Manuscripts ==
For the longest time the Libellus was known only from one manuscript of the 15th century. In 1985, a second copy was discovered, also of the 15th century. R. B. C. Huygens produced the first critical edition based on both manuscripts. Both manuscripts include several other texts on the Holy Land besides the Libellus.

== Bibliography ==
=== Editions ===
- Theodericus (1865). Titus Tobler (ed.). Theoderici Libellus de locis sanctis: editus circa AD 1172; cui accedunt breviores aliquot descriptiones Terrae sanctae. St. Gallen: Huber.
- Theodericus (1994). "Libellus de locis sanctis". In R. B. C. Huygens (ed.). Peregrinationes tres. Corpus Christianorum Continuatio Mediaevalis, 139. Turnhout: Brepols. pp. 143–197.

=== Translations ===
- Theoderich (1891). Theoderich's Description of the Holy Places (circa 1172 A.D.). Translated by Aubrey Stewart. London: Palestine Pilgrims' Text Society.

- Theoderich (1986). Ronald G. Musto (ed.). Guide to the Holy Land. Translated by Aubrey Stewart (2nd ed.). New York: Italica Press.
- Theoderich of Würzburg (2017). "Guide to the Holy Land". The Holy Land in the Middle Ages: Six Travelers' Accounts (2nd ed.). New York: Italica Press. pp. 127–216.

=== Secondary sources ===
- Jones, Timothy S. (2000). "Theoderic (fl. 1170)". In John Block Friedman; Kristen Mossier Figg (eds.). Trade, Travel, and Exploration in the Middle Ages: An Encyclopedia. Routledge. pp. 598–599.
- Parsons, Nicholas T. (2013) [2007]. Worth the Detour: A History of the Guidebook. The History Press. ISBN 9780752496047.
