= Manegold =

Manegold or Manegoldo may refer to:

== Given name ==
- Manegold of Lautenbach (c. 1030 – c. 1103), Alsatian philosopher
- Manegold of Mammern (d. 1133), abbot of Saint Gall
- Manegoldo del Tettuccio (fl. 1191), podestàa of Genoa
- Manegold of Berg (d. 1215), bishop of Passau

== Last name ==
- Albrecht Manegold (born 1974), German ornithologist and paleontologist
- Charles Manegold Jr. (b. 1851), American brewer

== See also ==
- Mangold
- Mengold
