= Monastery of Saint Stephen =

The Monastery of Saint Stephen or Saint Stephen's Abbey may refer to:

- Abbey of Saint-Étienne, Caen
- Convento de San Esteban, Salamanca
- Monastery of Saint Stephen (Meteora)
- St. Stephen's Abbey, Augsburg
- St. Stephen's Abbey, Würzburg
- Saint Stephen Monastery of Goght
