= Humbert (bishop of Würzburg) =

Humbert or Hunbert (died 9 March 842) was the bishop of Würzburg from 833 until his death. Although he was resident in Würzburg from 815, Humbert seems to have been a suffragan bishop of the archdiocese of Mainz without a see of his own before he was appointed to succeed Wolfgar at Würzburg in 833.

Humbert was a friend and correspondent of Hraban Maur, whose biblical commentaries he greatly admired. He sent a large supply of parchment to Fulda Abbey to have copies made of some of Hraban's books for his cathedral's library. He also acquired biblical manuscripts and some commentaries by Bede.

== Sources ==
- McKitterick, Rosamond (1983). The Frankish Kingdoms under the Carolingians, 751–987. London: Longman.
