= Descriptio terrae sanctae =

Descriptio terrae sanctae or Description of the Holy Land may refer to:

- Descriptio terrae sanctae (c. 1200), by John of Würzburg
- Descriptio terrae sanctae (1283), by Burchard of Mount Sion
