= St. Stephen's Abbey, Würzburg =

Benedictine Monastery in Germany

St. Stephen's Abbey in Würzburg, Germany, was a Benedictine monastery, founded c.1013. It existed until 1803.

== History ==
St. Stephen's Abbey dates back to the collegiate monastery of St. Peter and Paul, founded by Henry of Rothenburg, Bishop of Würzburg about 1014, for regular canons who followed the Rule of St. Chrodegang. In 1057 Bishop Adalbero of Würzburg replaced the canons by thirty Benedictine monks from Ansbach. The canons moved to the newly founded collegiate monastery of Neumünster. After the transfer of relics of St. Stephen, it was named only after him, while the name of St. Peter and Paul was transferred to the new parish church.

In the first years the monastery was a double monastery with a hermitage of pious women was attached to the monastery of St. Stephan. The transfer of the nuns from St. Stephan to St. Afra took place at the end of the 12th century.

After a short period of decline in the first half of the fifteenth century, the abbey joined the reform Bursfelde Congregation in 1459. The abbey of St. Jakob zu den Schotten was founded around 1134 by monks from the Scots monastery at Ratisbon. The monks at St. James's were all Irish or Scots until 1497, when their number had dwindled down to one or two and the abbey was then given over to St. Stephen's for a time.

The historian Ignaz Gropp (1695–1758) was a monk of St. Stephen's. He wrote the history of several Franconian saints and monasteries, and edited "Collectio novissima scriptorum et rerum Wireceburgensium a saecula XVI hactenus gestarum" (4 vols., Frankfort and Würzburg, 1741–50).

In 1789, the monks under Abbot Gerhard III von Winterstein replaced the Romanesque basilica with a new neoclassical building, designed by Johann Philipp Geigel. The monastery was dissolved in 1803 in the course of secularization. The abbey church and the monastery were then used as a Protestant parish church and school. In 1840, parts of the buildings became the seat of the government of Lower Franconia.

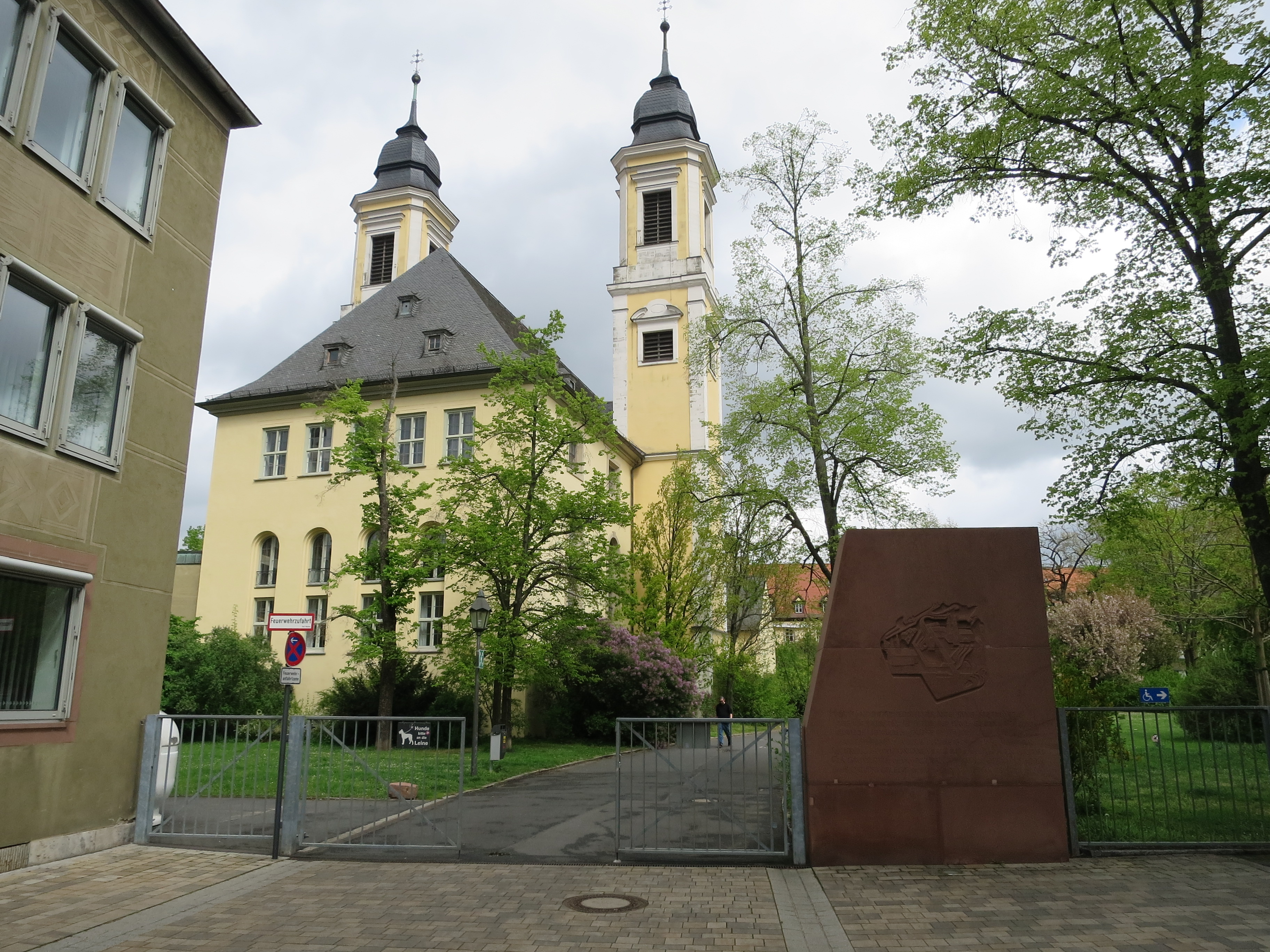
St. Stephan

The monastery buildings were totally destroyed and demolished in 1945. The church was rebuilt in 1949-1955 as a flat-roofed hall building, consecrated in 1952 and is now the deanery church of Würzburg. Around the church, institutions such as the Rudolf Alexander Schröder House, a Protestant bookstore and a counseling center, make the place the Protestant center of Würzburg.
