= Neumünster, Würzburg =

Coordinates: 49°47′38″N 9°55′54″E

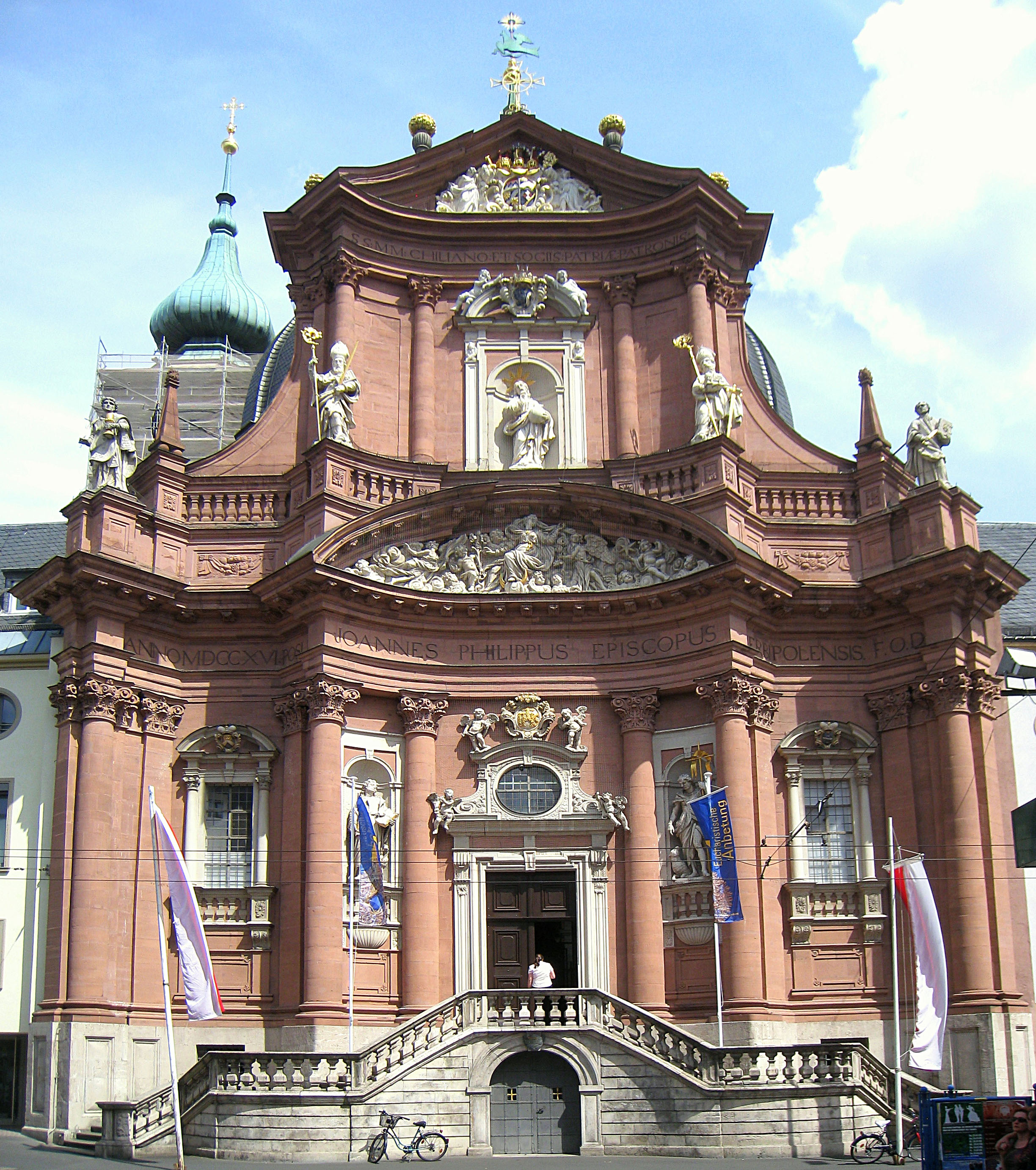
Neumünster Collegiate church, Würzburg, west façade in Baroque style

The Neumünster Collegiate church (German: Kollegiatstift Neumünster, French: Collégiale de Neumünster) is a former collegiate church in Würzburg, Germany. The church dates back to the 11th century.

== History ==
The first church on the site was probably built during the tenure of Meningoz of Würzburg to commemorate the place where the so-called Franconian Apostles, Kilian, Colman, and Totnan, were martyred. Burchard, Meningoz's predecessor, and later Meningoz himself were buried in this church. The monumental inscription on Meningoz's sarcophagus is the oldest post-roman inscription in Franconia.

In 1057, Adalbero of Würzburg founded the college of canons of Neumünster, dedicated to John the Evangelist. The church was completed three years later in the Romanesque style. The church was renovated and expanded from 1180 to 1250.

From 1711 to 1716 Josef Greising built the west façade in the Baroque style. From 1725 the interior was redesigned in the baroque style by the brothers Johann Baptist Zimmermann and Dominikus Zimmermann. As a consequence of the German mediatisation, the church was temporarily used as a munitions depot until 1821. The Neumünster first became a parish church, separate from the adjacent Cathedral, in 1908. The parish is dedicated to John the Baptist and John the Evangelist.

The church was heavily damaged in the bombing of Würzburg in 1945, leading to the destruction of much of the church's interior, including the Tilman Riemenschneider busts of the Franconian Apostles (afterwards replaced by copies). However, damage was not as severe as that in the Cathedral, so the Neumünster was the seat of the Bishop of Würzburg from 1950 until the Cathedral's reopening in 1967. The Neumünster was once again renovated from 2009 to 2011, some baroque elements were restored and art by modern artists including Michael Triegel and Hann Trier was installed.

== Lusam Garden ==
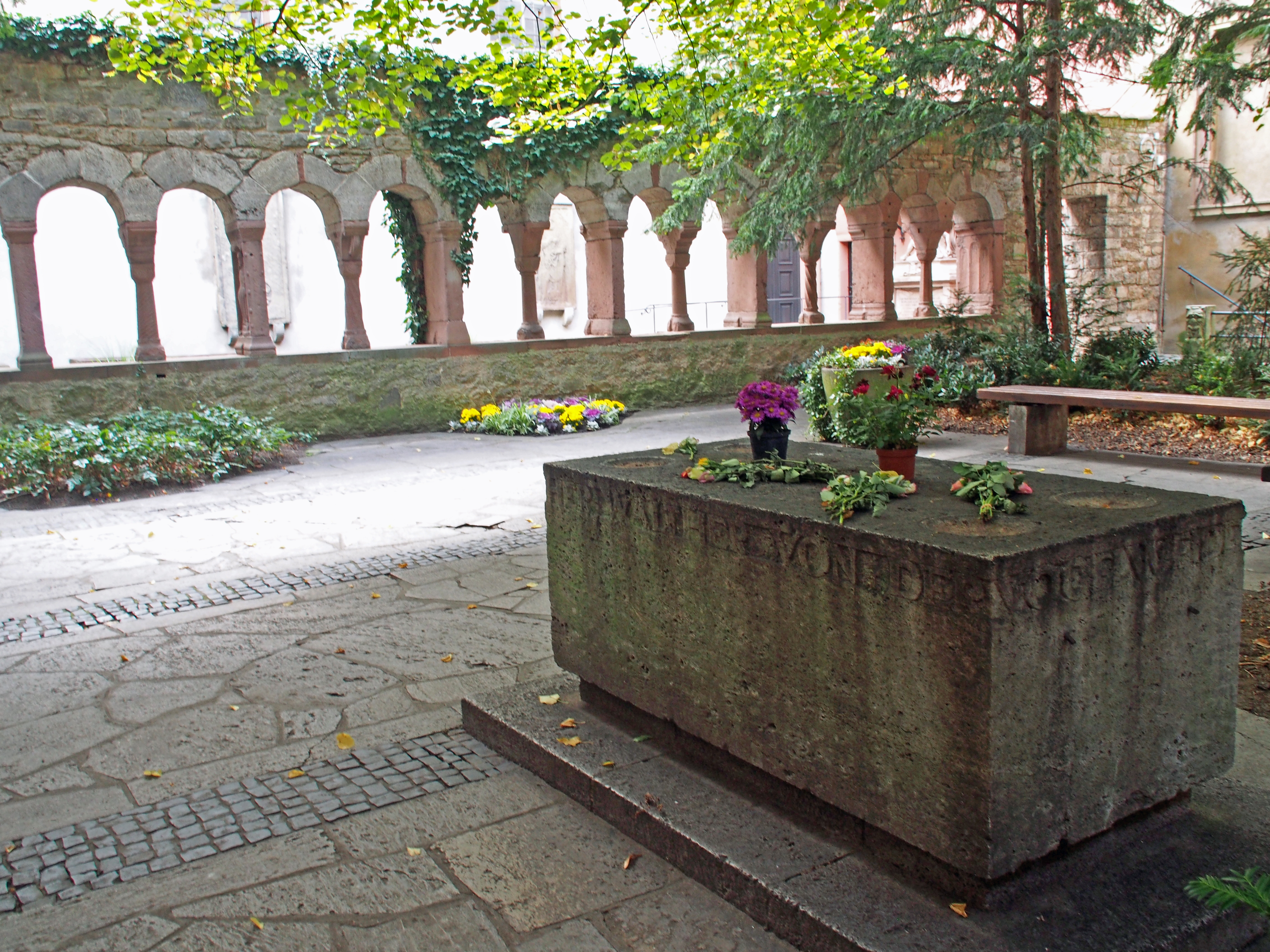
The monument to Walther von der Vogelweide and arcades at the Lusam Garden

On the north end of the church is the Lusam Garden (Lusamgärtchen), a small garden in the former cemetery and cloister of the Neumünster College of Canons. It is probable that the legendary minstrel singer Walther von der Vogelweide was buried here, today, there is a monument dedicated to him in the garden. The monument features circular divots for birdfeed and water, so that birds can feed at Walther's grave.

Sixteen arcades of the original cloister still remain in the garden, they date to the late 12th century. Some of the arcades feature Romanesque carvings, the reliefs of Christ in Majesty and St. Kilian are thought to be some of the earliest examples of sculpture in Würzburg.
