= Rudolf von Scherenberg =

German bishop of Wurzburg

Rudolf II von Scherenberg
- Prince-Bishop of Würzburg
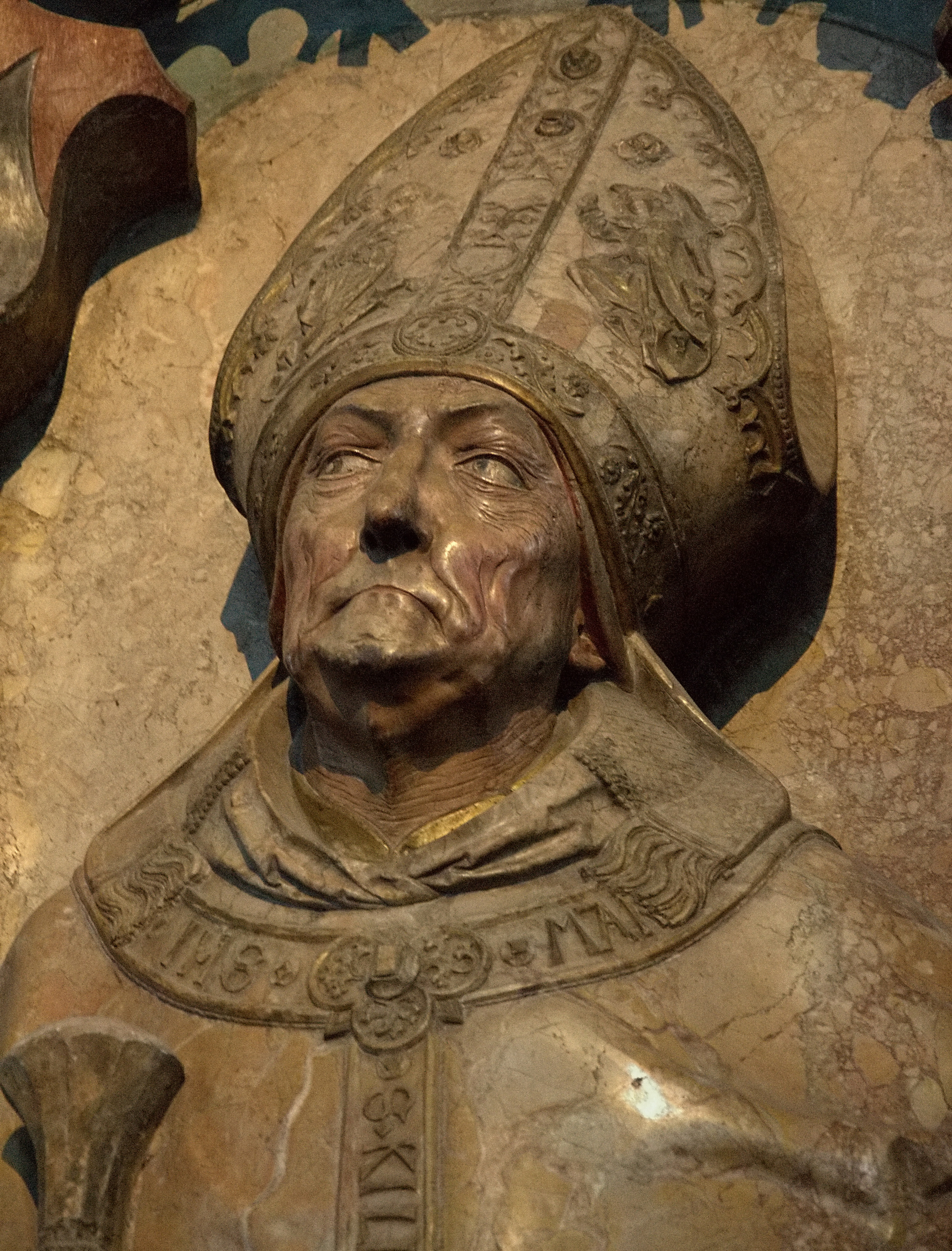
- Detail of tomb of Rudolf von Scherenberg by Tilman Riemenschneider in Würzburg Cathedral (1496-1499).
- See: Würzburg
- Elected: 30 April 1466
- Appointed: 20 June 1466
- Installed: 28 September 1466
- Term ended: 29 April 1495 (death)
- Predecessor: Johann von Grumbach
- Successor: Lorenz von Bibra

Orders
- Consecration: 28 September 1466 by Heinrich von Absberg

Personal details
- Born: Würzburg
- Denomination: Roman Catholic

Rudolf II von Scherenberg (c. 1401 – 1495) was Bishop of Würzburg from 1466 until his death 30 years later. His longevity (about 94) and long reign were significant.

Rudolf von Scherenberg was the son of Erhard von Scherenberg and Anna von Massbach. On 30 April 1466, he was appointed as bishop to replace Johann von Grumbach. He was confirmed as bishop on 20 June 1466.

The Scherenberg Gate at the Fortress Marienberg, the entrance to the main courtyard, is named after him.

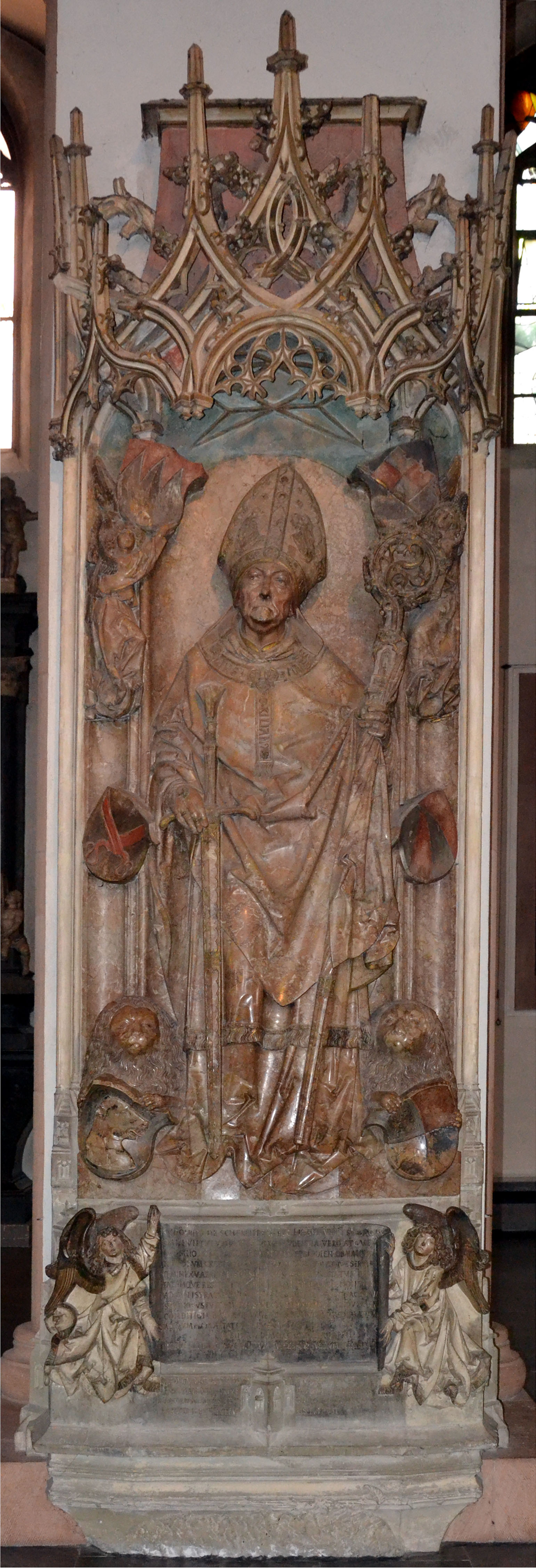
Image of entire tomb

== Tomb ==
Prince-Bishop von Scherenberg is best known because of his tomb in Würzburg Cathedral. On his death in 1496, his successor, Lorenz von Bibra, commissioned Tilman Riemenschneider to make his monument.

Catholic Church titles
Preceded by Johann von Grumbach	Prince-Bishop of Würzburg; 1466–1495	Succeeded by Lorenz von Bibra
