= Adalbero of Würzburg =

Catholic saint, bishop of Würzburg (1010–1090)

Saint Adalbero of Würzburg
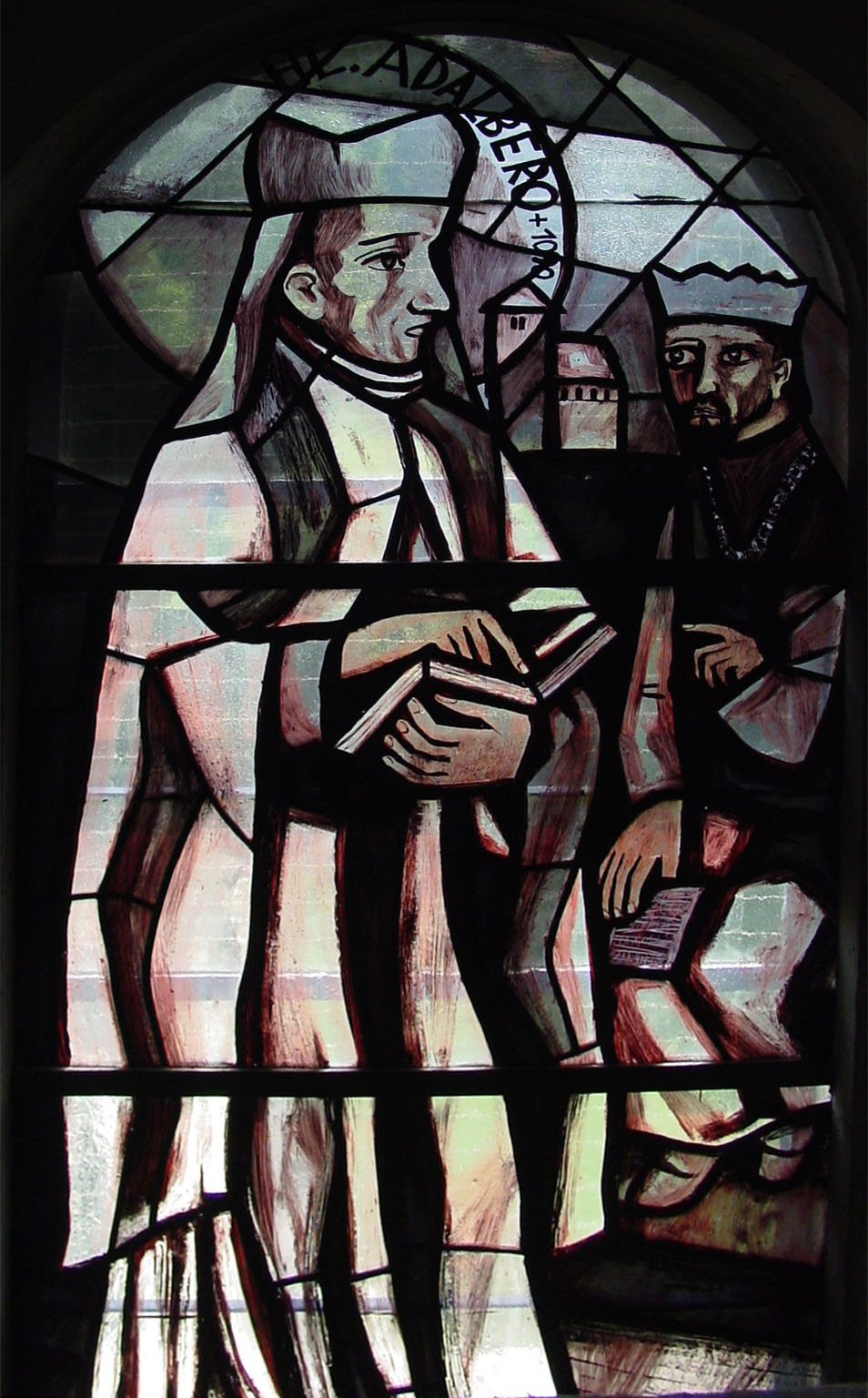
- Adalbero in stained glass in the parish church of Liesing

Bishop
- Born: c. 1010; Lambach an der Traun
- Died: 6 October 1090; Lambach an der Traun
- Canonized: 1883 by Pope Leo XIII
- Feast: 6 October

Adalbero of Würzburg (or Saint Adalbero; c. 1010 – 6 October 1090) was Bishop of Würzburg and Count of Lambach-Wels.

== Life ==
Born around 1010 in Lambach, Adalbero was the youngest son of Count Arnold II of Wels-Lambach in Upper Austria (of the family of the Counts of Formbach) and his wife the Countess Reginlindis. Adalbero was the nephew of Bishop Bruno of Würzburg. After his studies in the cathedral school at Würzburg and later in Paris, Adalbero became a canon of Würzburg. It was during this time that he probably composed the earliest surviving set of rules for rithmomachia under the name "Asilo". In 1045, King Henry III, nominated Adalbero successor to Bruno as Bishop of Würzburg.

Bishop Adalbero continued the construction of the new Würzburg Cathedral begun by Bruno, adding the east crypt and the east choir. He established the "Neumünsterkirche" ("New Minster Church") (built between 1058 and 1063). Significant contributions in the reform of ecclesiastical life are attributed to him. He was in close contact with the reformers at Cluny, Gorze and Hirsau. He brought the monk Egbert from Gorze, who proved extremely effective firstly in bringing about the renewal of Münsterschwarzach Abbey and then, through the spread of the subsequent Münsterschwarzach Reforms, in exerting an influence far beyond it, from Harsefeld Archabbey near Stade in the north to Melk.

In 1056 he began the restoration of the Lambach Abbey, founded by his father in the family castle. After the death of Henry III that same year, Adalbero, godfather to Henry IV, spent more time attending court, where he gained a reputation as an advisor and mediator. He also intensified his involvement in the councils of the empire and in synods.

In 1057 Adalbero re-settled the abbey of St. Peter, Paul and Stephen in Würzburg, until then a college of Canons Regular, with Benedictines from Münsterschwarzach. In 1066 in Würzburg he performed the marriage ceremony between Henry IV and Bertha of Savoy. Together with other princes he brokered the Peace of Speyer in 1075.

In the Investiture controversy which broke out shortly afterwards, Adalbero took the side of Pope Gregory VII in opposition to Henry IV. Gregory objected to the practice of the appointment of bishops being vested in territorial princes rather than in the papacy. The Synod of Worms however supported Henry against Gregory's ideas and declared the Pope deposed, whereupon Gregory excommunicated Henry, forcing him to go to the Pope at Canossa to seek absolution.

Having obtained this, however, the dependency of the bishops on the king was once again reinforced. Adalbero and other princes therefore in March 1077 appointed as anti-king Duke Rudolf of Rheinfelden. Henry IV, hastened to return to Germany, and in the same year besieged Wurzburg. Wurzburg was strategically important because it controlled communications between the rebel areas of Saxony and Swabia. Having succeeded in raising the citizens against Adalbero, the bishop had to leave the city. King Henry appointed a series of anti-bishops.

In 1086 Rudolf of Rheinfelden returned him to Würzburg, but he was soon ejected again. Adalbero rejected all attempts at mediation, saying that he would die rather than yield. At the Synod of Mainz in 1085 therefore he was formally deposed and forced into exile. He remained faithful to the pope, and was sent to his monastery in Lambach. In 1088 Adalberone renounced his episcopal dignity and dedicated the monastery of Komburg, near Schwabisch Hall, in Württemberg. The following year, he was also co-founder of Zwiefalten Abbey in Swabia. On 6 October 1090 he died in Lambach and was buried in the abbey church which he himself had founded and dedicated.

== Veneration ==
In 1883 Pope Leo confirmed Adalbero a saint in the worldwide church. In the "Neumünsterkirche" in Würzburg since 1948 there has been a glass shrine, by Josef Amberg, containing a thighbone of Adalbero as a relic. Also in Würzburg is the neo-Romanesque St. Adalbero's church.

=== Iconography ===
Adalberone is represented with a church in his hand.

== Sources ==
- Engel, Wilhelm (1953). Adalbero, Bischof von Würzburg. In: Neue Deutsche Biographie (NDB) (in German). Berlin: Duncker & Humblot. p. 41. ISBN 3-428-00182-6.
