= Berowulf =

Berowulf or Berowelf (died 26 September 800) was the bishop of Würzburg from 768 or 769 until his death. Since the 11th century, his name has appeared as Bernwelf. It may also be spelled Berowolf, Bernwulf or Bernulf. Berowulf's predecessor, Megingoz, retired in 768.

The first reference to Berowulf as bishop comes from April 769. Prior to his election he was a monk from the local monastery of Sankt Andreas. As bishop, he introduced the rule of Chrodegang to replace that of Boniface. He had a close relationship with Charlemagne (reigned 768–814), who charged him with the evangelisation of the Slavs in the upper Main region.

In 779 he was commissioned to establish a new missionary diocese, the bishopric of Paderborn, in the east. The first two bishops of that see, Hathumar and Badurad, were sent to Würzburg Cathedral to be educated at the school Berowulf had established. He also grew the scriptorium, and the first catalogue of books in the cathedral library dates from his episcopate. The main part of the list was written in an Anglo-Saxon hand around 800. A later addition, in a German hand, notes five books which had been lent to Holzkirchen and Fulda Abbey. In all, it contains thirty-five books. It was compiled after 787—since the manuscript fly-leaf contains a copy in the same hand of Charlemagne's letter De litteris colendis of that year—but probably before 800.

In October 788, Berowulf brought the relics of Saint Kilian to the cathedral which now bears the saint's name. In 787, he tried unsuccessfully to assert episcopal control over Fulda. His successor in Würzburg was the obscure Liuttrit (800–803).

== Sources ==
- Engel, Wilhelm (1955). "Berowelf". Neue Deutsche Biographie. Vol. 2. p. 146.
- Lowe, Elias Avery (1928). "An Eighth-Century List of Books in a Bodleian MS. from Würzburg and Its Probable Relation to the Laudian Acts". Speculum. 3 (1): 3–15. doi:10.2307/2848117. JSTOR 2848117.
- McKitterick, Rosamond (1983). The Frankish Kingdoms under the Carolingians, 751–987. London: Longman.
