= Aghjots Vank =

Cultural heritage monument of Armenia

Aghjots Vank Աղջոց վանք
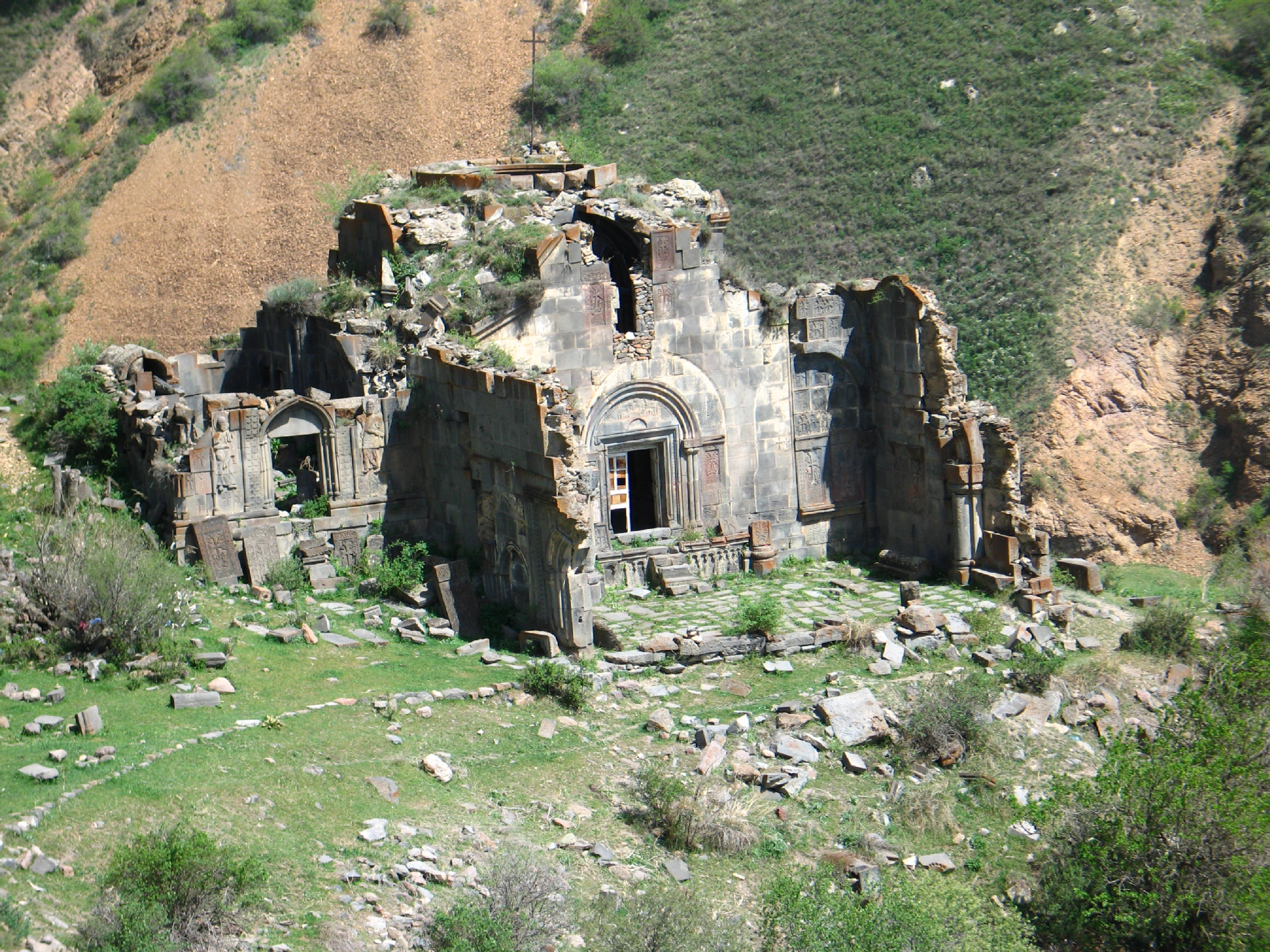
- Aghjots Vank with the small chapel of 1270 (left)

- Location within Armenia Location within Ararat

Religion
- Affiliation: Armenian Apostolic Church
- Region: Caucasus
- Status: Abandoned/ Ruins

Location
- Location: Located approximately 3 miles from Goght and Garni, and .5 miles from the hamlet of Mets Gilanlar in the Khosrov State Reserve, Ararat Province, Armenia
- Coordinates: 40.106929°N 44.807396°E

Architecture
- Type: Armenian; Monastery
- Founder: Grigor Lusavorich
- Funded by: Princess Zaza, Ivane Mkhargrdzeli and Prince Grigor Khaghbakian.
- Groundbreaking: Unknown
- Completed: Saint Stephen Church, early 13th century Saints Paul and Peter Church, 1270; Gavit, late 13th century

Aghjots Vank (Armenian: Աղջոց վանք); also known as the Saint Stephen Monastery of Goght (Armenian: Գողթի Սուրբ Ստեփանոս վանք), is a 13th-century monastery situated along a tributary of the Azat River Valley within the Khosrov State Reserve located half a mile walk from the hamlet of Mets Gilanlar, and near the villages of Goght and Garni (approximately 3–4 miles) in the Ararat Province of Armenia. Not far from this location and also within the reserve is the fortress of Kakavaberd and the monastic complex of Havuts Tar.

== Etymology ==
The etymology of Aghjots Vank is derived from the nearby abandoned village of Aghjots.

== History and Site ==
According to local folklore, the monastery was founded by Grigor Lusavorich upon the site of the martyrdom of Stepanos (Stephen), a supposed companion to Saint Hripsime during the time of Armenia's conversion to Christianity in 301 AD. The 5th-century Armenian historian Agathangelos wrote that the young and beautiful Hripsimé who at the time was a Christian nun in Rome, was to be forcefully married to the Roman emperor Diocletian. She and the abbess Gayané among other nuns fled the tyrant emperor and left to Armenia. The pagan Armenian King Trdat received a letter from Diocletian in which he described her beauty. Trdat discovered where the nuns were hiding, and fell in love with Hripsimé and later Gayané. After her refusal of his advances, Hripsimé was tortured and martyred at the location of Saint Hripsime Church, while Gayané was tortured and martyred at a separate location where Saint Gayane Church was later built in 630. The remaining group of thirty-eight unnamed nuns were martyred at the location where the Shoghakat Church is today. During the time that Hripsimé was being tortured, Gayané told her to "be of good cheer, and stand firm" in her faith. King Trdat was to be later converted to Christianity and made it the official religion of the kingdom.

The exact date that the monastery was founded is unknown. What is known is that the majority of the monastery was commissioned by Prince Grigor Khaghbakian and his wife Princess Zaz in 1217.

The complex of Aghjots Vank consists of the church of Surp Stepanos or Saint Stephen, the church of Saints Paul and Peter, and the adjacent gavit.

Surp Stepanos church was built during the early 13th century and is the main church within the complex. It has a cruciform plan, four portals and a vaulted church of S. Poghos Petros attached to the northern wall.

The church of Paul and Peter was built in 1270 and has remarkable bas-relief carvings of Saints Peter (left) and Paul (right) that flank the portal.

A gavit that has since partially fallen down the hill, was added to the western end of S. Stepanos in the second half of the 13th century. Further construction was funded by Ivane Zakarian as well as in 1217 by the local Prince Grigor Khaghbakian of the Proshyan dynasty. The Church of Saints Peter and Paul was built by their son, prince Vasak.

Aghjots Vank was sacked by the Persians in 1603 and restored soon after. It was destroyed again in the Earthquake of 1679 that destroyed the nearby monastery of Havuts Tar and the pagan temple of Garni. The monastery was despoiled again in the 18th century and permanently ruined during the Armenian–Tatar massacres of 1905–1906. It now sits in ruins within the Khosrov State Reserve.

Numerous inscriptions may be seen on the churches and gavit. The site has several khatchkars dating from the 12th to 17th centuries, some of which were built into the walls of the structures. There is a cemetery from the 7th to 17th centuries located approximately 150 meters west of the complex upon a hill.

Aghjots Monastery is included in the watch list of World Monument Fund.

== Gallery ==
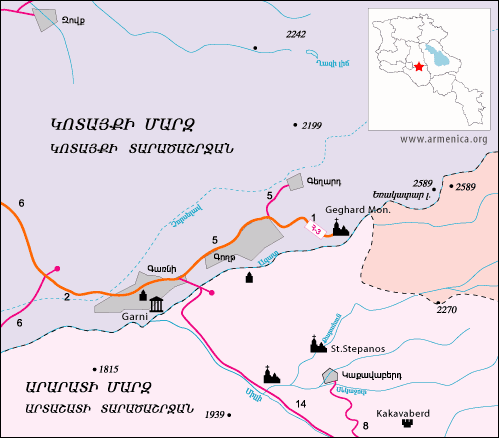
Map showing the location of Aghjots Vank in relation to the villages of Garni and Goght

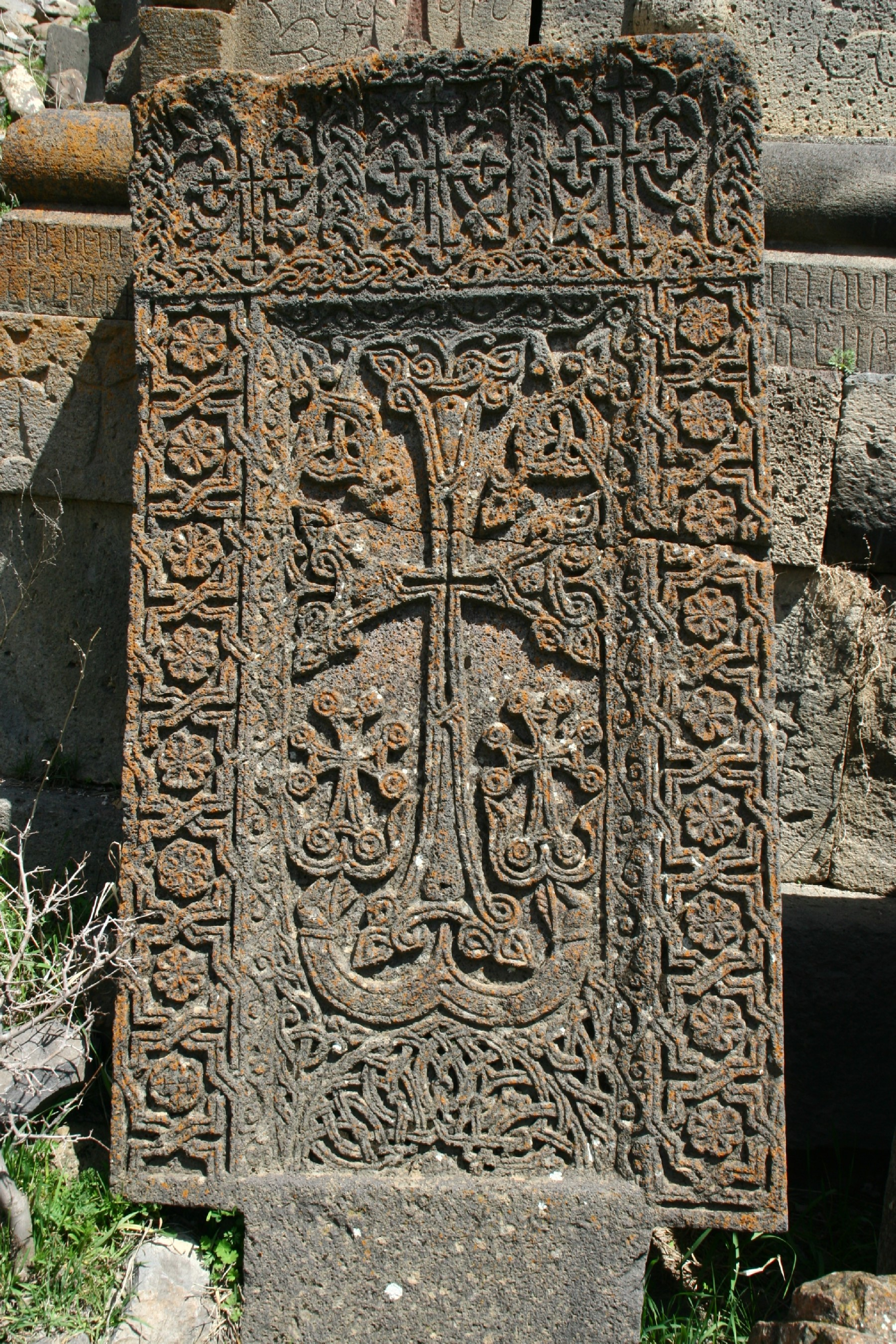
Khatchkar cross in Aghjots Vank

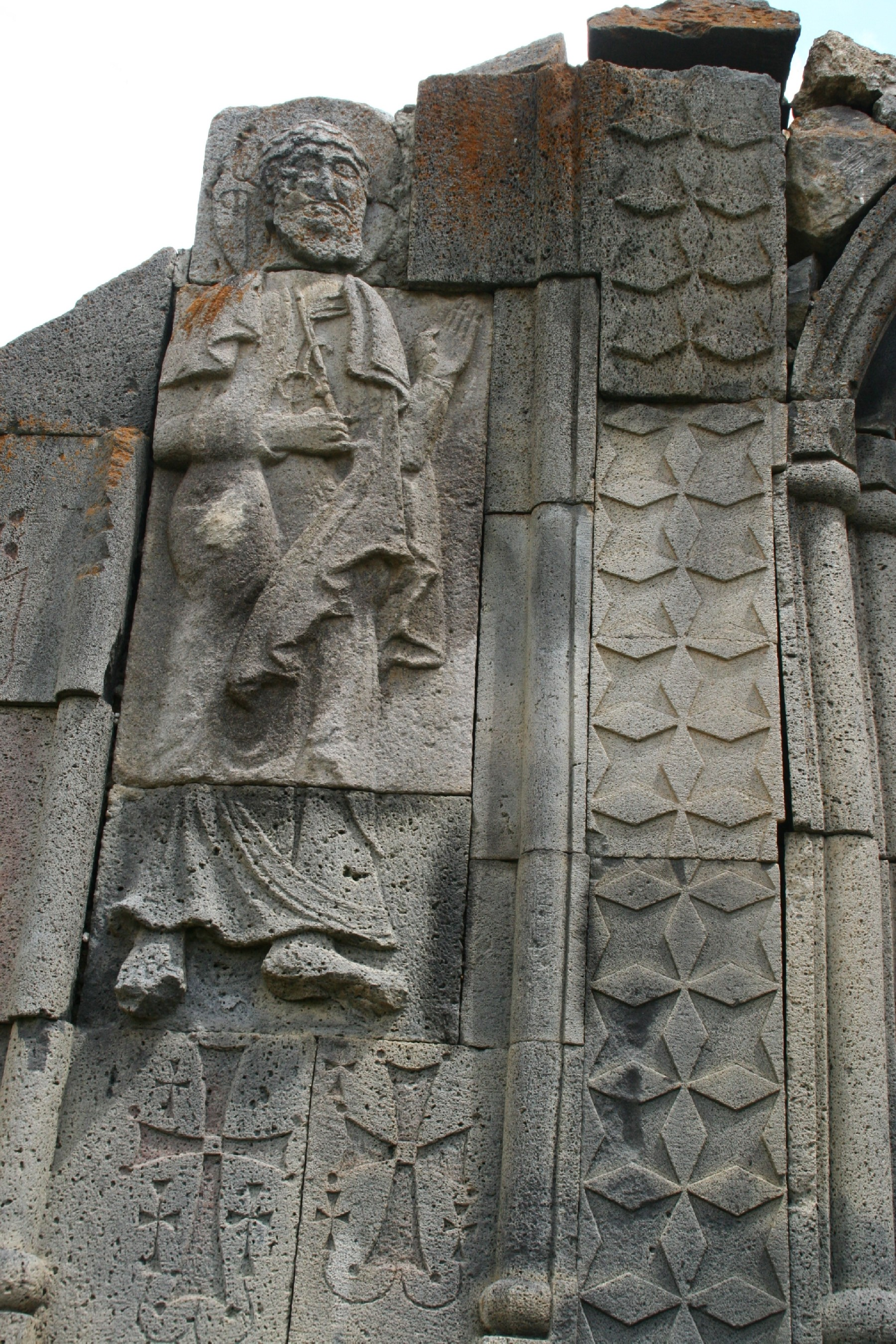
Human figure in Aghjots Vank

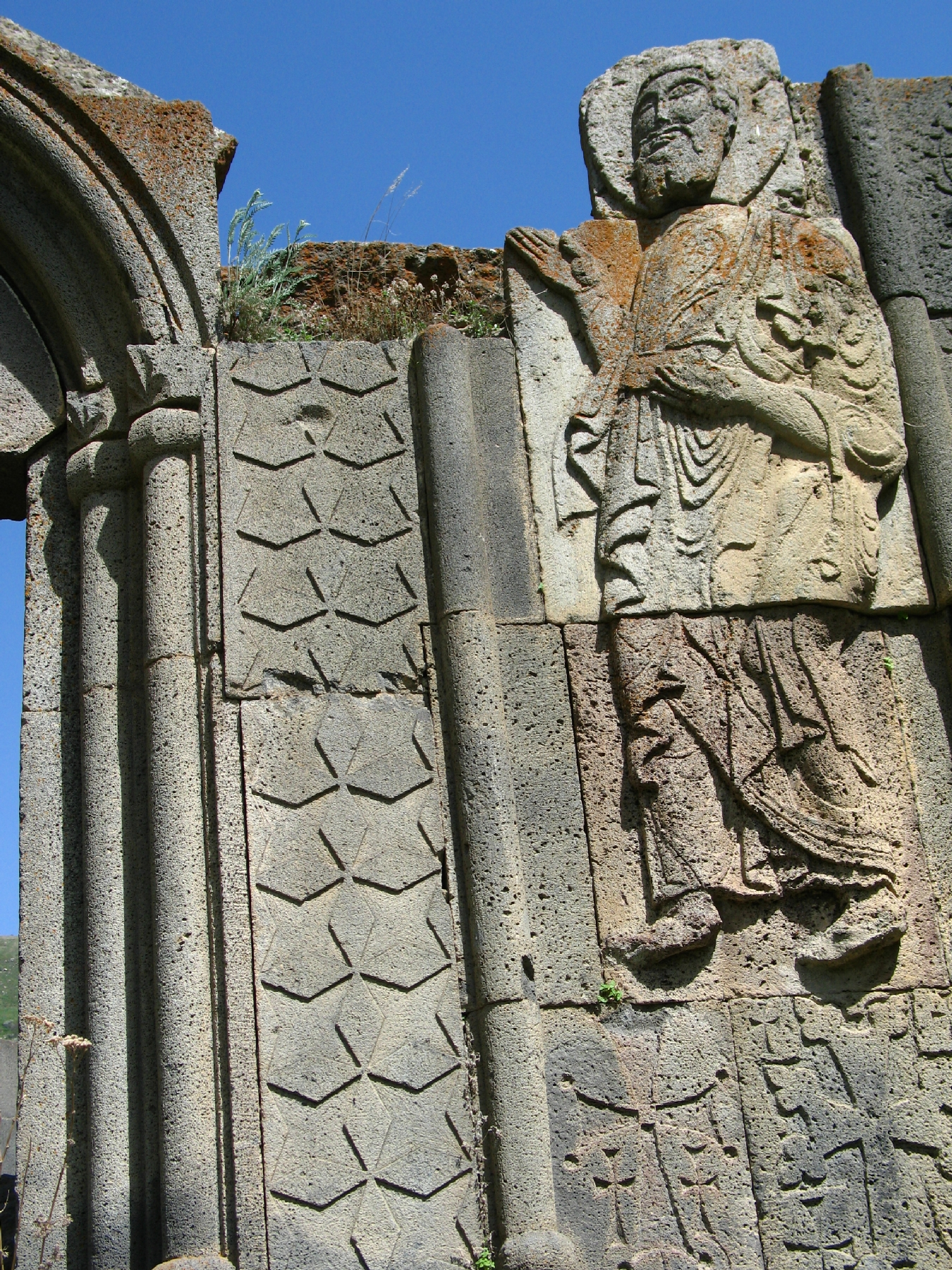
Human figure in Aghjots Vank
