= Wolfgar (bishop of Würzburg) =

German bishop

Wolfgar or Wolfger was the bishop of Würzburg from 809/10 until his death in 831/2. He succeeded the obscure bishop Egilwart (803–09/10).

Wolfgar was on good terms with the Emperor Louis the Pious. During his episcopate, Würzburg increased its properties and over twenty surviving manuscripts were produced in its scriptorium. This time was a transitional period in the history of the cathedral library, whose output is known collectively as the Libri sancti Kyliani, in which insular script and the local variant of Caroline minuscule first appear. Pastoral books, liturgies and the Old Testament dominated the scriptorium's output, and a work of canon law was copied at Würzburg for the first time under Wolfgar.

An original charter recording a transaction between Wolfgar and a Count Eginonus and his wife Wentilgarth is preserved.

== Sources ==
- Dale, Johanna (2008). "The Provenance of Cambridge, Corpus Christi College, MS 373". Transactions of the Cambridge Bibliographical Society. 14 (1): 33–50.
- McKitterick, Rosamond (1983). The Frankish Kingdoms under the Carolingians, 751–987. London: Longman.
