= Gilanlar =

- Mets Gilanlar (also, Mets-Gilaylar, and Bol’shoy Gilanlar) is a hamlet in the Ararat Province of Armenia.
- Pokr Gilanlar (also, Pokr-Gilaylar, and Malaya Gilanlar) is a hamlet in the Ararat Province of Armenia.
