= Dietrich of Hohenburg =

Dietrich of Hohenburg (also Homburg or Hohenberg) was the bishop of Würzburg in 1224. From a ministerial (servile knightly) family, he was educated in Würzburg. He was elected bishop following the death of Otto of Lobdeburg on 4 December 1223. The succession was smooth, since Dietrich had been confirmed as bishop by 8 January 1224. His episcopate was short, however. He died between 14 December 1224 and 25 February 1225. According to a medieval catalogue of bishops of Würzburg in the Bavarian State Library, however, Dietrich "was appointed bishop in the year 1223[,] held the office for one year, two months, and fourteen days [and] died 1224, in the reign of Frederick II."

Dietrich (Theoderich) is sometimes identified as the friend to whom John of Würzburg dedicated his Description of the Holy Land around 1170. He may also be identified with the author of the Little Book of the Holy Places, who went on a pilgrimage of his own to the Holy Land in 1172. There is insufficient information to determine if the dedicatee, the pilgrim and the bishop are one and the same, or else two or three different persons.
