= Franz Jung (bishop) =

German Roman Catholic bishop

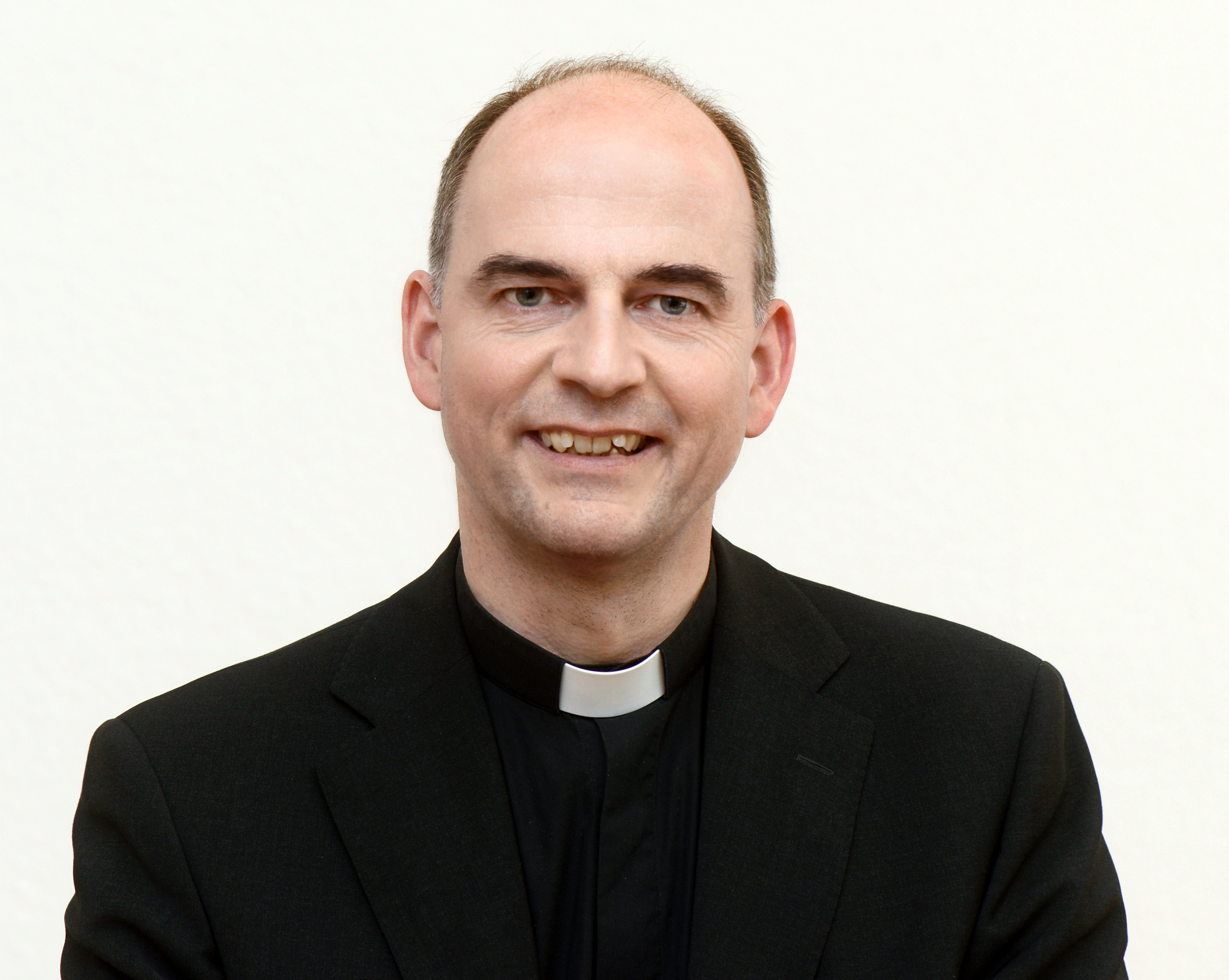
Franz Jung (2018)

Franz Jung (born 1966 in Mannheim) is a German Roman Catholic bishop.

== Life ==
Jung studied Roman Catholic theology and philosophy at Ducal Georgianum in Munich and at Pontifical Gregorian University in Rome. On October 10, 1992 he became priest. In January 2009 Jung became Vicar general of the Roman Catholic Diocese of Speyer. Since June 10, 2018 Jung is bishop of Roman Catholic Diocese of Würzburg. He succeeded German bishop Friedhelm Hofmann .

== Positions ==
In February 2018, Jung supported married priests in the Roman Catholic Church.

== Works by Jung ==
- Sōtēr. Studien zur Rezeption eines hellenistischen Ehrentitels im Neuen Testament. Aschendorff, Münster 2002, ISBN 340204787X. Rezensionen (u. a.): Klaus Berger: Welt voller Retter. In: Frankfurter Allgemeine Zeitung, 10. Juli 2002, Nr. 157, S. 36 (online); Reinhard Feldmeier, in: Theologische Literaturzeitung 2003 (online).
- "Herr, gib mir dieses Wasser, damit ich keinen Durst mehr habe" (Joh 4,15). Die Samariterin am Jakobsbrunnen als Paradigma für "Katechese in veränderter Zeit". In: Thomas Schmeller (Hrsg.): Neutestamentliche Exegese im 21. Jahrhundert. Grenzüberschreitungen. Für Joachim Gnilka. Herder, Freiburg 2008, ISBN 978-3-451-29933-9, S. 319–344.
- Habt ihr ihn gesehen, der meine Seele liebt? (Hld 3,3). Das Hohelied Salomos und seine Auslegung in Geschichte und Gegenwart. In: Edith Düsing, Hans-Dieter Klein (Hrsg.): Geist, Eros und Agape. Untersuchungen zu Liebesdarstellungen in Philosophie, Religion und Kunst. Königshausen & Neumann, Würzburg 2009, S. 121–146, ISBN 978-3-8260-3923-2.
- Hilarius von Arles, Leben des hl. Honoratus. Eine Textstudie zu Mönchtum und Bischofswesen im spätantiken Gallien mit lateinisch-deutschem Text des "Sermo" sowie zweier Predigten über den hl. Honoratus von Faustus von Riez und Caesarius von Arles. Carthusianus-Verlag, Fohren-Linden 2013, ISBN 978-3-941862-13-5.
