= Pokr Gilanlar =

- Location within Armenia Location within Ararat
- Coordinates: 40°06′00″N 44°48′00″E
- Country: Armenia
- Marz (Province): Ararat
- Time zone: UTC+4 ( )
  - Summer (DST): UTC+5 ( )

Pokr Gilanlar (also, Pokr-Gilaylar, and Malaya Gilanlar) is a hamlet in the Ararat Province of Armenia.

== See also ==
- Ararat Province
- Gilanlar
