= Megingoz =

Megingoz (also Meingoz, Megingaud, Megingod, Meingaud, etc.) is a masculine given name of Germanic origin. It is a compound of roots meaning "strength" (cf. OHG magan) and Geats (cf. ON Gautar). Latinizations include Megingaudus, Megimgausus, Maingaudus, Maingauldus, Magingotus, etc., whence forms like Mengold and Meingold.

It may refer to:

- Megingoz of Würzburg (d. 783), bishop 753–768
- Megingoz, who with his brother Manto, made a major donation to Fulda Abbey in 788
- Megingoz (d. after 808), son of Gerold of Anglachgau
- Megingoz (fl. 876), count in the Wormsgau, member of the Wilhelminer family
- Megingaud, count in the Maiengau, lay abbot of St. Maximin's Abbey, Trier (887–892)
- Mengold of Huy (d. 892), count venerated as a saint
- Megingoz, abbot of Hersfeld (932–935)
- Meingaud, count in the Maingau (965–987) and Lobdengau (987–1002), member of the Conradine family
- Megingoz of Guelders (d. c. 1000), count
- Megingaud of Eichstätt (d. c. 1015), bishop from 991
- Megingaud of Trier (d. 1015), archbishop from 1008
- Megingoz of Merseburg, bishop 1126–1140
- Meingoz of Lechsgemünd, abbot of Weingarten (1188–1200)
