= Egilwart =

Bishop of Würzburg

Egilwart was the bishop of Würzburg from 803 until 810. Of him nothing more is known.

== Sources ==
- McKitterick, Rosamond (1983). The Frankish Kingdoms under the Carolingians, 751–987. London: Longman.
