= Manegoldo del Tettuccio =

Brescian politician

1st Podestà of the Republic of Genoa
- In office 1191–1191
- Preceded by: Position established
- Succeeded by: Oberto di Olivano

Personal details
- Born: Brescia

Manegoldo del Tettuccio was a Brescian politician, and the first Podestà of the Republic of Genoa, elected in 1191.

== History ==
The Republic of Genoa, characterized by the intensification of the struggles between the city factions, had induced the Genoese to suspend the magistracy of the Consuls in 1190 and to appoint a podestà.

Manegoldo del Tettuccio was known to his contemporaries for his skills and wisdom and for these reasons he was called to Genoa in 1191 as the first podestà of the Republic to quell the internal unrest that ravaged its capital. He repressed these bloody diatribes, thus pacifying the Genoese capital for the duration of his mandate.

However, the innovation had not achieved the aim of slowing down the city factions, indeed at the end of Manegoldo's mandate the struggle was resumed with greater vigor.
