= Lorenz von Bibra =

Prince bishop of Wurtburg

- Prince-Bishop of Würzburg
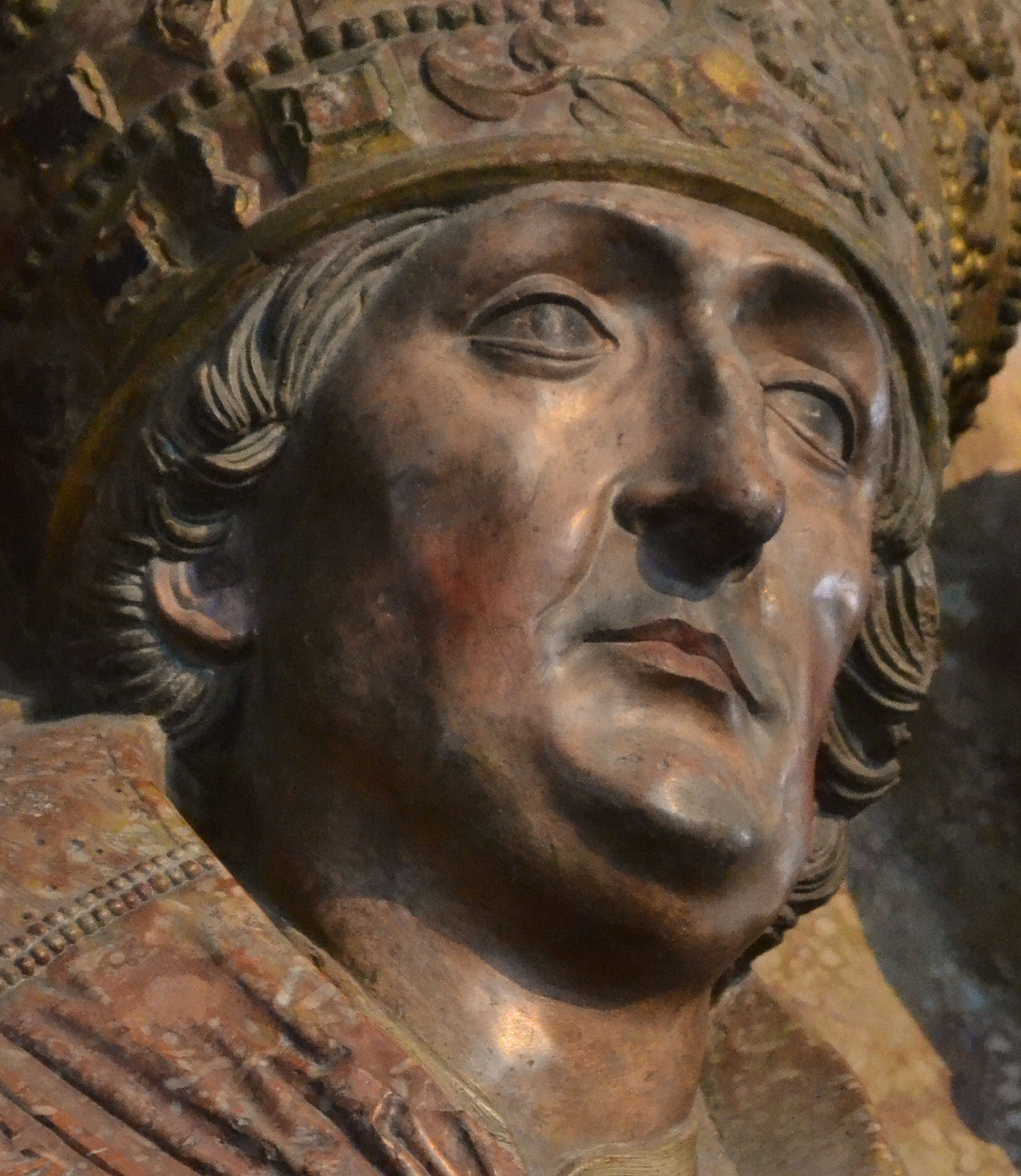
- Detail of tomb by Tilman Riemenschneider in Würzburg Dom (cathedral) (c. 1460 - July 7, 1531) in Würzburg Dom (cathedral)
- See: Würzburg
- Elected: 12 May 1495
- Installed: 11 October 1495
- Term ended: 6 February 1519
- Predecessor: Rudolf von Scherenberg
- Successor: Koenrad von Thüngen

Orders
- Consecration: 11 October 1495 by Heinrich Groß von Trockau

Personal details
- Born: 1459 Mellrichstadt
- Died: 6 February 1519 (aged 59–60) Würzburg
- Denomination: Roman Catholic
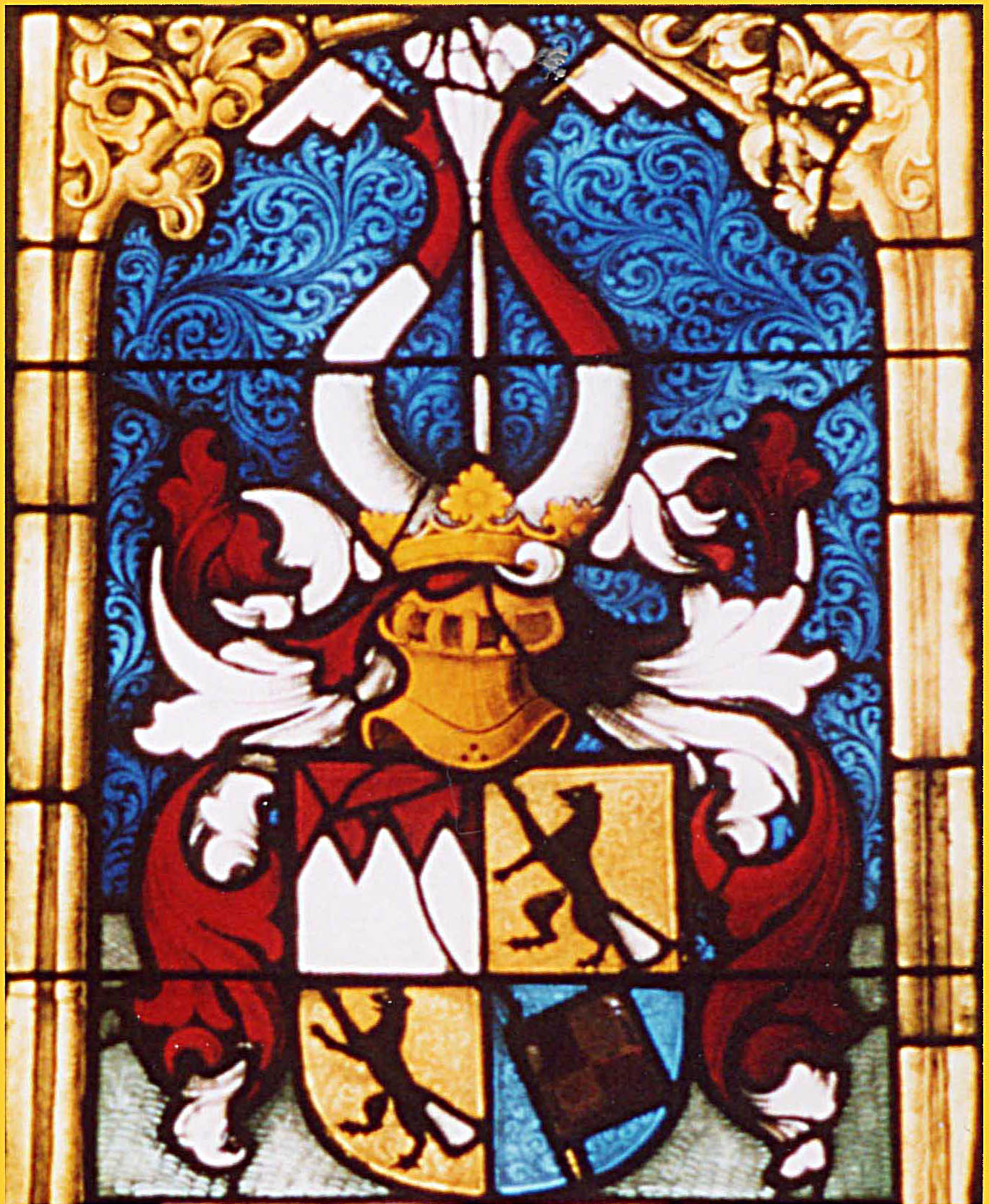
- Coat of arms

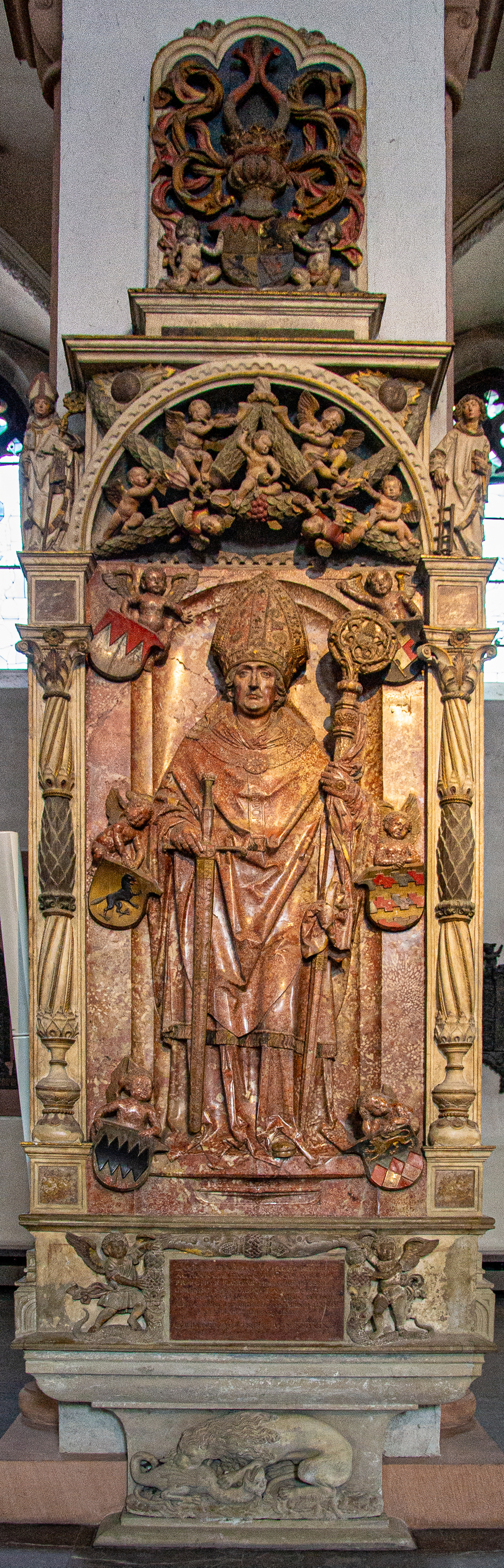
Lorenz von Bibra's tomb by Tilman Riemenschneider

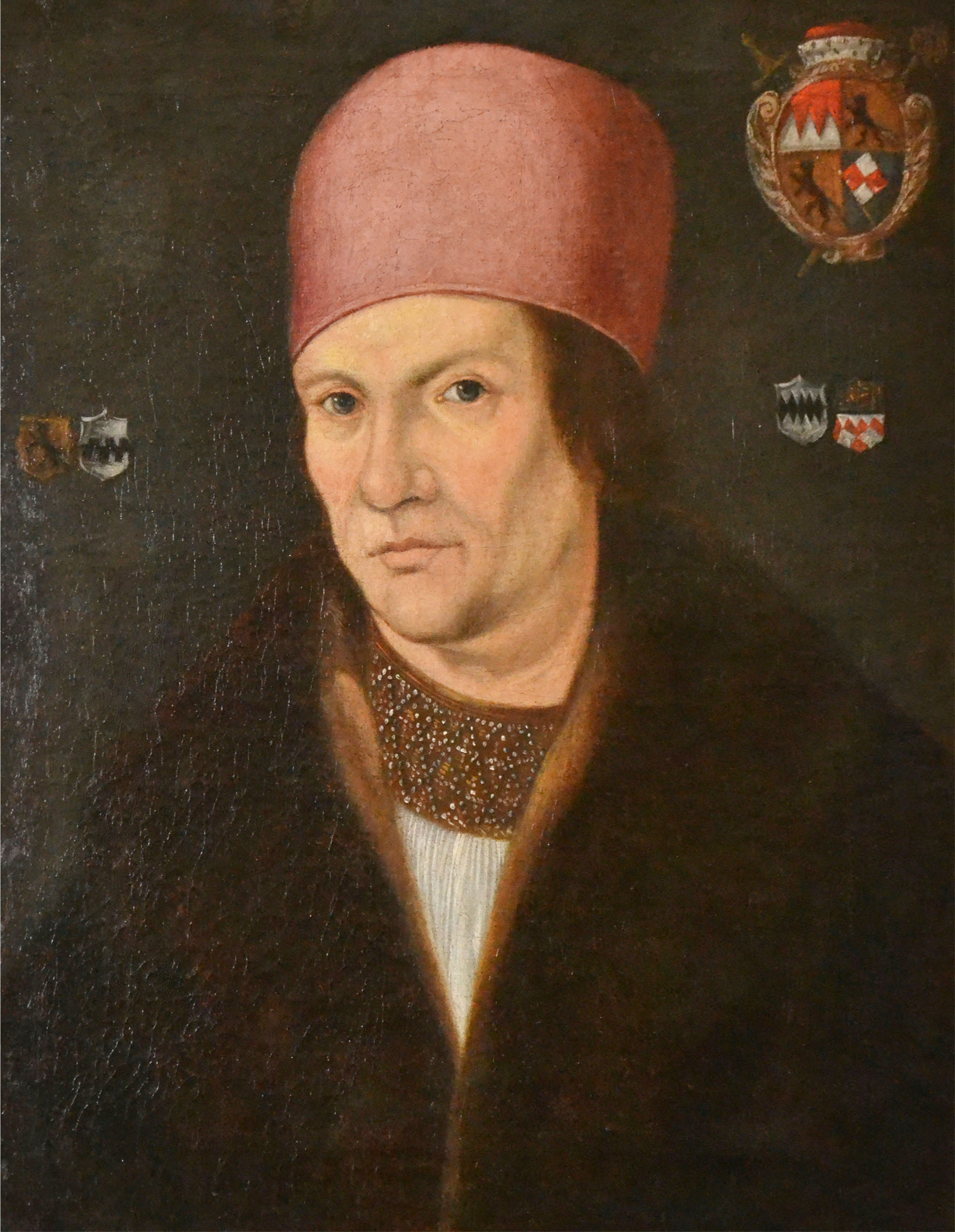
Lorenz von Bibra

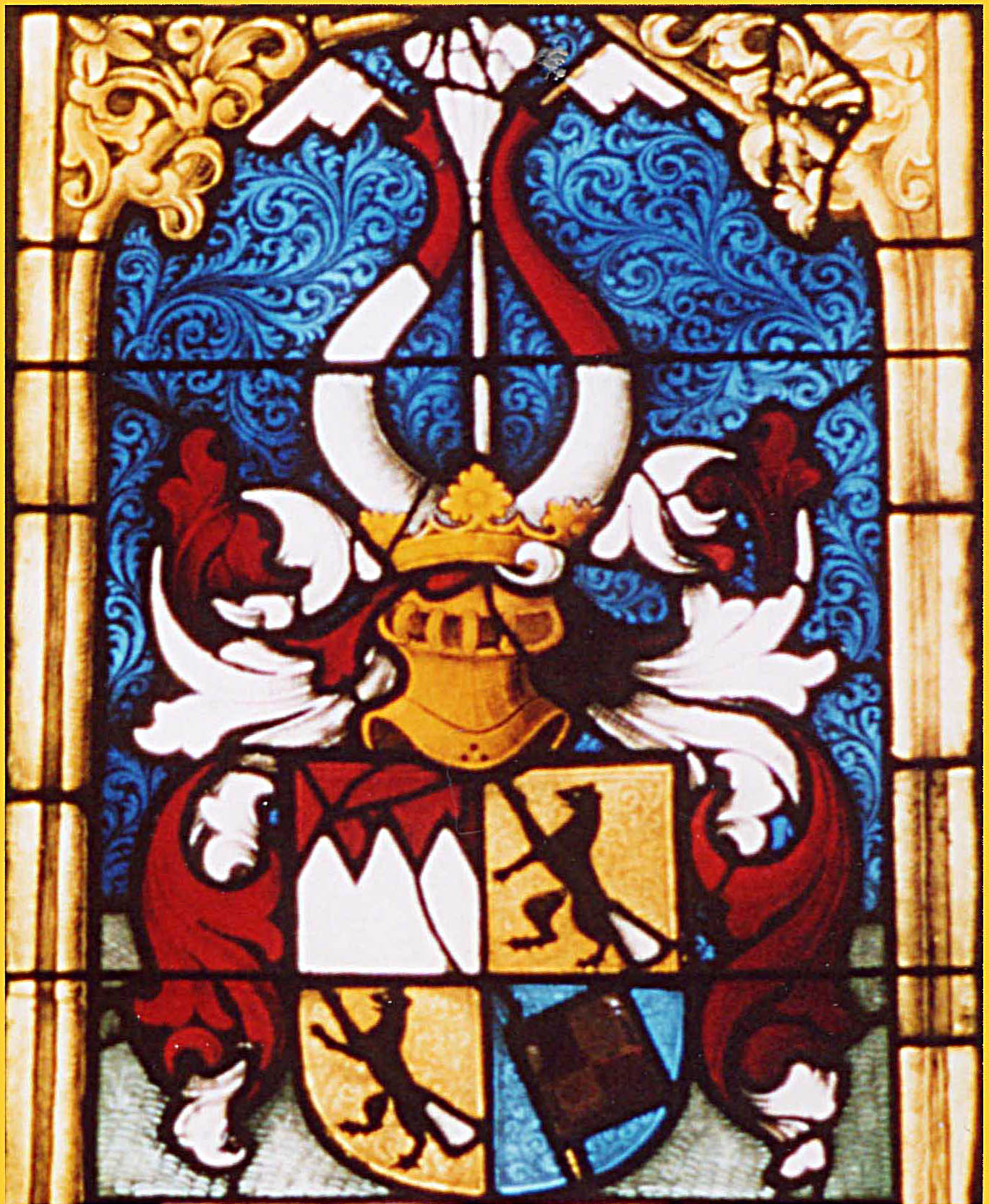
Lorenz von Bibra stained glass window at St. Leo's church in Bibra

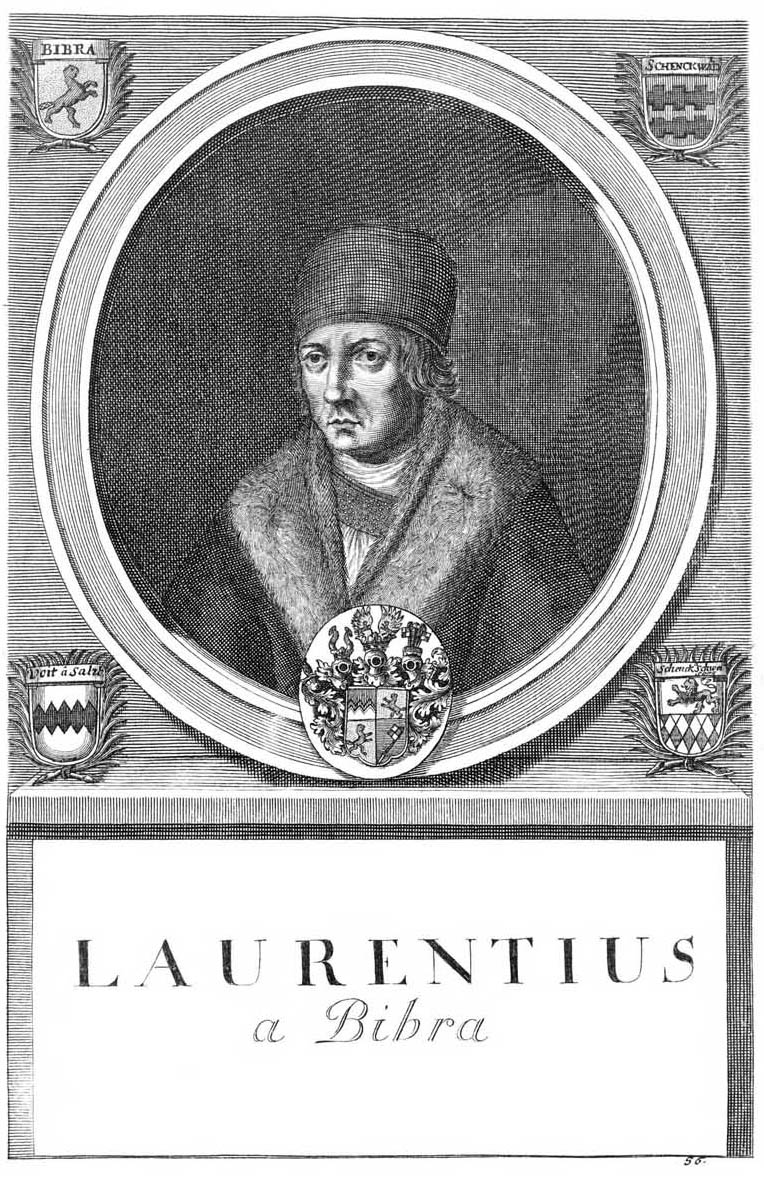
Image by Johann Salver

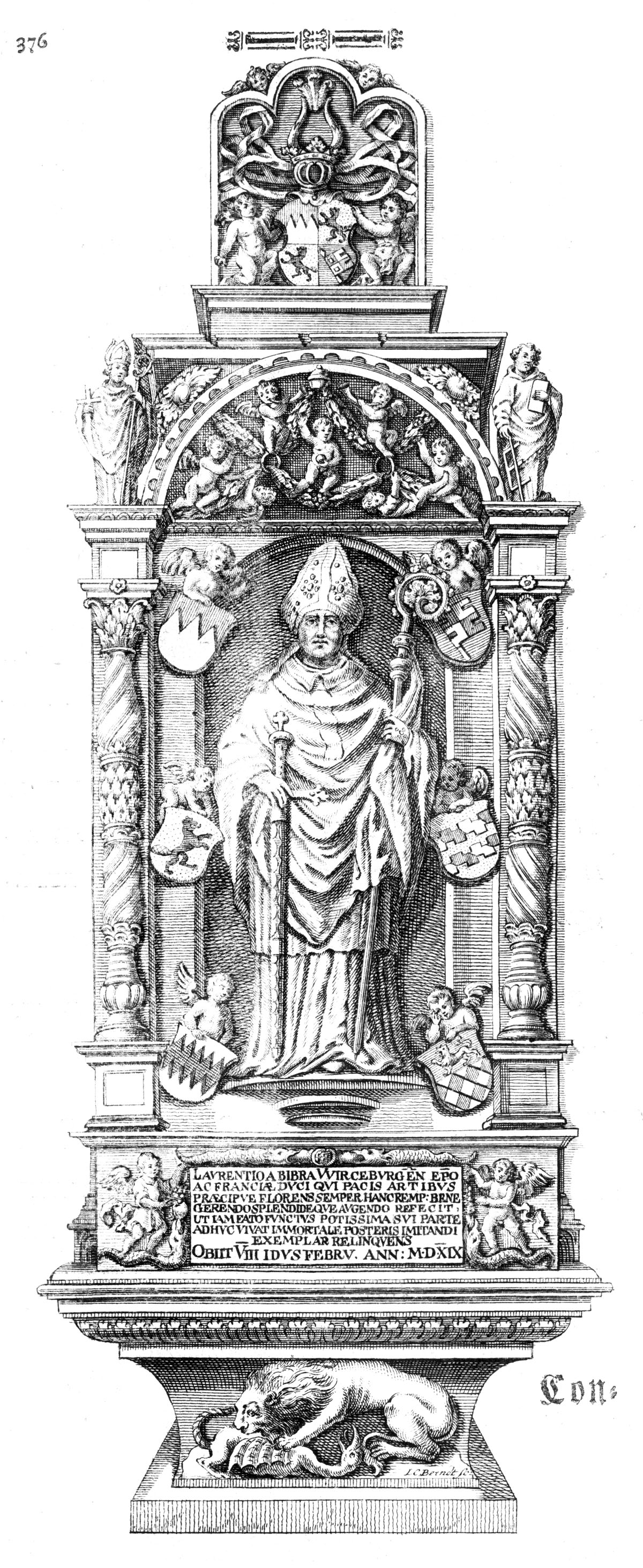
Johann Octavian Salver

Lorenz von Bibra, Duke in Franconia (1459, Mellrichstadt – 6 February 1519, Würzburg) was Prince-Bishop of the Bishopric of Würzburg from 1495 to 1519. His life paralleled that of Maximilian I (1459–1519), who ruled the Holy Roman Empire from 1493 to 1519, whom Lorenz served as an advisor.

Born in 1459, he attended school at Vessra Abbey and university at Heidelberg, Erfurt, and Paris. In 1487 he wrote a letter of introduction to Pope Innocent VIII for his half brother Wilhelm who was being sent to the Vatican as emissary of Archbishop Hermann IV of Cologne. In 1490, Wilhelm became ill and died when returning from Rome as an emissary of Frederick III, Holy Roman Emperor. The grave of Wilhelm von Bibra is still to be seen in the Pelligrini Chapel of the Santa Anastasia Church in Verona.

Lorenz was a popular and well respected ruler. He was often called upon to serve as an arbitrator to solve disputes. An adherent of the German humanism movement of the late 15th and early 16th centuries and renaissance man, he sought to bring reforms to the Catholic Church from within.

== Lorenz von Bibra and Martin Luther ==
=== Meeting with Luther and letter to Frederick the Wise ===
Lorenz met with and got along well with Martin Luther. Luther arrived on April 18, 1518 in Würzburg with a letter of introduction from Duke Frederick the Wise of Saxony. Lorenz offered a new escort accompany him to Heidelberg Disputation. Luther turned down the offer as Luther’s Erfurt brethren, Land and Usingen, met him and offered a ride on their cart. This was right before Luther's disputes with the Catholic Church heated up and right before Lorenz died in 1519. Following the meeting in Würzburg, Lorenz wrote a letter of recommendation to Duke Frederick the Wise of Saxony stating:

Your beloved Excellency you should not allow this pious man, Dr. Martin Luther to leave your boundaries because something unjust might happen to him. (Euere Liebden wolle ja den frommen Mann Doktor Martinus nicht wegziehen lassen, denn ihm geschähe Unrecht.)

George Spalatin wrote:

The Bishop’s words pleased Frederick the Wise so much that he copied the letter with his own hand and sent it to me at Lochau. (Welche des Bischofen Wort diesem Churfürsten von Sachsen so wol gefielen, dass er mirs, Spalatino, mit eigener Hand umgeschrieben zur Lochau zuschickt, mich auch noch um diese Wort wenig Wochen vor ihrem Abschied von diesem Jammerthal durch Joachim Sack fragen liess .)

=== Speculation by historians, what if Lorenz had lived longer ===
Frederick the Wise was the second most powerful man in the Holy Roman Empire and became Luther's greatest protector and champion during the Reformation. This letter has helped fuel speculation over Lorenz's sympathies. Baier reports that the historians von Seckendorff, Lingke, Strobel, Walch, Engelhardt, Vierort, Tentzel, Löhe, Shornbaum and Köstlin (in contrast to Scharold) agreed with Splatin that had Lorenz lived longer, the Episcopate of Würzburg would have gone over to the Protestants.

Baier quotes Splatin:

this bishop of Würzburg is such an understanding, wise and honest man that he had been in the same year the advisor of the Prince Elector of Cologne, the Pfalzgrafen and Prince Elector by the Rhein and he also was His Majesty the Emperor Maximilian’s advisor, and also, of course, the Bishop of Würzburg. Had this Bishop Lorenz von Bibra lived longer, the people around him would have thought that he would have accepted the holy Evangelium, since he had an even thinking of the Roman papal attitude and also the newly created gülden Gnadenjahr dealing with indulgences. (Dieser Bischof zu Würzburg ist ein solcher verständiger, weiser, ehrlicher Mann gewest, dass er in einem Jahr des Erzbischofen zu Köln, des Pfalzgrafen Kurfürsten bei Rhein, des Herrn rö. Kaisers Maximilians dazu Rat und letztlich auch Bischof zu Würzburg worden. Hätt auch dieser Bischof von Würzburg Lorenz von Bibra länger sollen leben, so haltens wohl Leut dafür, die ihn sehr wohl gekannt haben, dass er das hl. Evangelion auch angenommen hätt, denn er war sehr übel gewest an dem römischen Wesen, wolle auch ihr erdichtet gülden Gnadenjahr und Ablasskrämerei nicht zulassen je länger je weniger.)

=== Luther’s comments on Lorenz’ views on monasteries and convents ===
Bair quotes also quotes Splatin:

I heard among noble people of Franconia the talk saying that if a noble man would have come and asked Lorenz for a special favor he would have offered him to bring his son or daughter into a monastery even with the collateral, Lorenz probably would have said: ‘I prefer you would give your daughter to a husband instead of putting her in a convent. Do you need money for this? If so, I will lend it to you. (Ich hab auch mal Edelleut aus Franken davon hören reden, dass sie sagten: Wenn ein Edelmann wär kommen und hätt ihn gebeten um Gunst, etlich Güter zu versetzen, wenn er gehört hat, dass er einen Sohn oder Tochter wollt damit ausstatten, in ein Kloster zu geben, so hätt er gesagt: "Lieber, gib deiner Tochter einen Mann, gibs nicht iu’s Kloster. Darfst Du Geld dazu so will ich Dir leihen." So gar übel war es auch am Klosterwesen, Möncherei und Nonnerei gewesen.)

An incident that occurred while Luther traveled through Würzburg was later commented on by Luther. Some young Domherren (members of the cathedral chapter) took part in a terrible fight among themselves whereby one of them lost his hand. Lorenz “jailed” them in a monastery. Luther later commented:

If the Bishop of Würzburg ever saw a bad fellow, he would say: Only the monastery for you; you are of no use either to God or to your fellow-man. (Wenn der Bischof Lorenz von Würzburg einen bösen Buben sah, sagte er: ei, nur ins Kloster mit dir, du bist weder Gott noch den Menschen nutz)

=== Pilgrimages to Grimmenthal ===
A chapel at Grimmenthal was erected by a Würzburg Captain which was dedicated by the Suffragan bishop of Lorenz, Georg von Bipolis, on August 24, 1498. The number of pilgrims grew so much and the money came in so abundantly that a bigger church had to be built by the chapel which was inaugurated on May 1, 1502. Luther had nothing nice to say about this:

Through the big fraud of the devil came about the pilgrimage of Grimmenthal servant and maids, shepards and women left their jobs and ran away to Grimmenthal. It’s right Grimmenthal, valley of fury (vallis furoris); and evidently nobody talks against it. The Bishop of Würzburg keeps his mouth closed and even agrees with this pilgrimage.(daher ist kommen der grosse Betrug des Teufels mit den Wallfahrten in Grimmenthal, da Knecht und Mägde, Hirten, Weiber ihren Beruf liessen austehen und liefen dahin. Ist recht Grimmenthal, vallis furoris; da war Niemand, der ein Wort dawider geredet. Der Bishop von Würzburg schwieg stille dazu und williget darein.)

== Present day influences ==
The exchange between Luther and Lorenz was the inspiration of a short two scene play, Luther bei Lorenz von Bibra, by Deacon Dr. Günter Breitenbach of the Evangelical Church in Germany, in September 2007 and performed October 2, 2007 at the Augustinerkirche in Würzburg with Dr. Breitenbach in the role of Lorenz von Bibra and Catholic Augustinian Provinzprokurator Br. Peter Reinl OSA in the role of Luther.

Bishop Lorenz is also used as an important character in the 2010 historical novel Die Königin der Gaukler (Queen of the Jugglers) by Guido Dieckmann.

== Lorenz von Bibra and Riemenschneider ==
Contrary to his successor, Lorenz also had good relations with the famous sculptor Tilman Riemenschneider who at a time also served as mayor of Würzburg. Lorenz commissioned him to make an altar for the new church in Bibra. Lorenz also commissioned Riemenschneider to do both his predecessor's, Rudolf von Scherenberg, and his own grave marker in the cathedral in Würzburg. Today, the two gravestones stand side by side, same stone and motif, but in two different styles, late gothic and renaissance.

== Lorenz von Bibra and Trithemius ==
Johannes Trithemius (1 February 1462 - 13 December 1516) in 1506 decided to take up the offer of Lorenz von Bibra to become abbot of the St. Jakob zu den Schotten, the Schottenklöster ("Scottish monastery") in Würzburg. The word steganography is taken from his book Steganographia, a treatise on cryptography and steganography disguised as a book on black magic and his book Polygraphia (1518) was the first printed book on cryptography.

== von Bibra Family ==
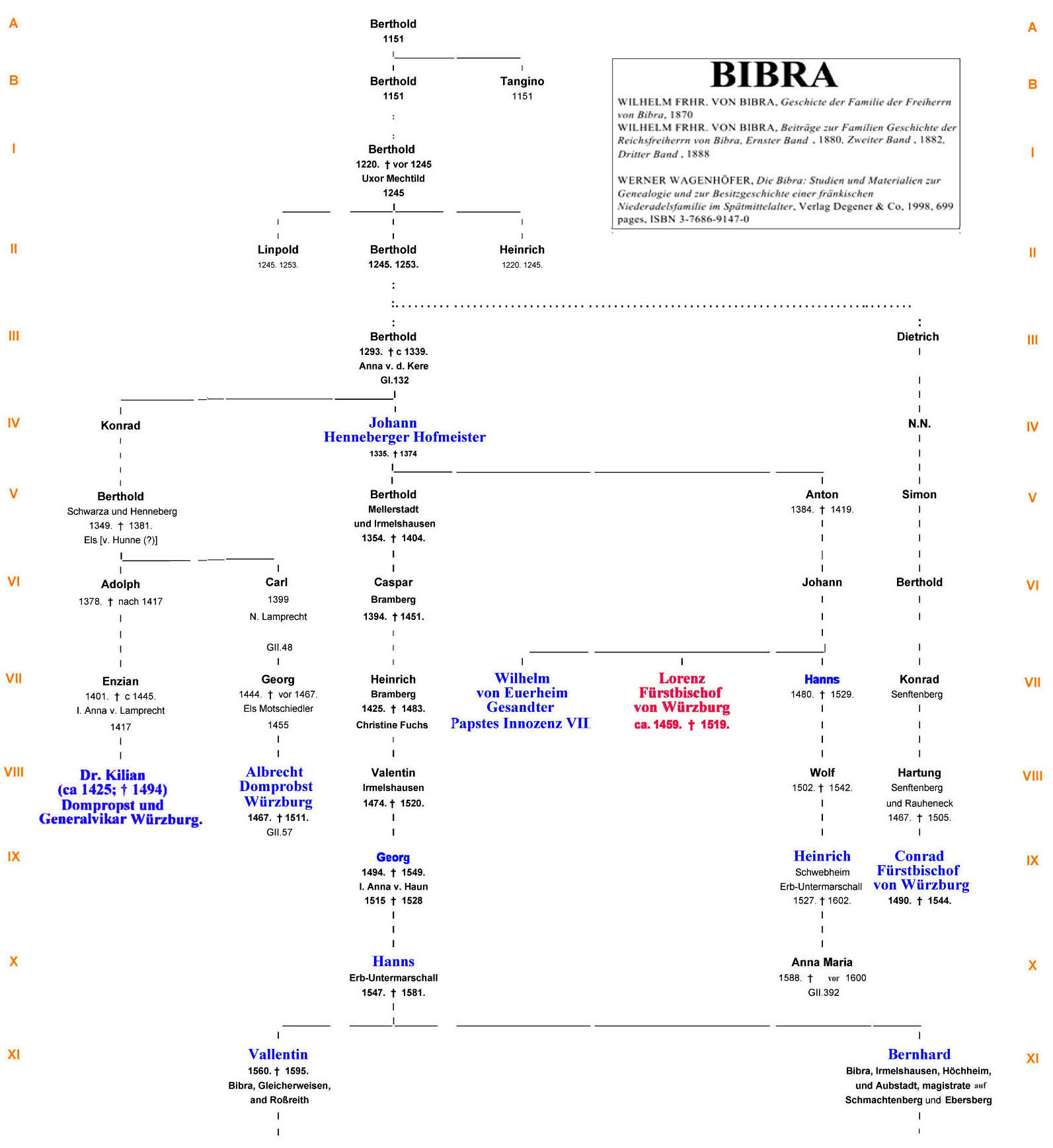

It has been noted that Lorenz appointed a very large number of his Bibra relatives to government positions in the Bishopric of Würzburg and that his successor, Konrad II von Thungen, also followed this same pattern but to an even greater degree.

Lorenz was a member of the aristocratic Franconian von Bibra family which among its members were Lorenz’ half brother, Wilhelm von Bibra Papal emissary, Conrad von Bibra, Prince-Bishop of Würzburg, Duke in Franconia (1490–1544), Heinrich von Bibra, Prince-Bishop, Prince-Abbot of Fulda (1711–1788) and Ernst von Bibra (1806–1878), naturalist and author.

Catholic Church titles
Preceded by Rudolf von Scherenberg	Prince-Bishop of Würzburg; 1495–1519	Succeeded by Konrad von Thüngen
