= Titus Tobler =

Swiss Oriental scholar (1806–1877)

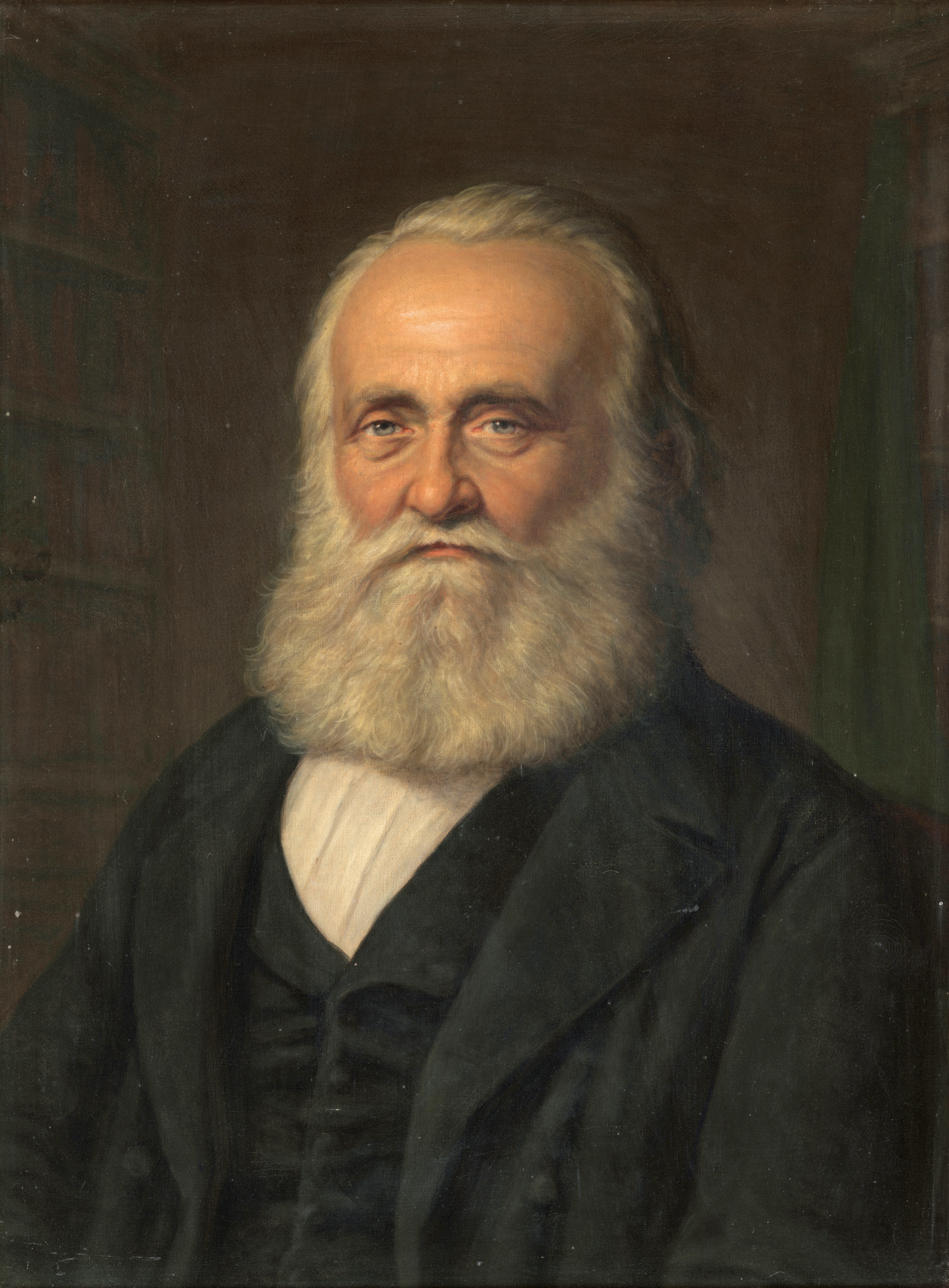
- Tobler in 1875
- Born: 25 July 1806; Stein, Appenzell, Switzerland
- Died: 21 January 1877 (aged 70); Munich, Germany

Titus Tobler (25 July 1806 – 21 January 1877) was a Swiss Oriental scholar.

== Biography ==
Tobler was born on 25 July 1806 in Stein, Appenzell, Switzerland. He studied and practised medicine. He travelled to Palestine and, after taking part in the political affairs of Switzerland, settled in 1871 in Munich, Germany. He died on 21 January 1877 in Munich.

== Works ==
His principal works are:

- Tobler, T. (1853). Dr. Titus Toblers zwei Bucher Topographie von Jerusalem und seinen Umgebungen (in German). Vol. 1. Berlin: G. Reimer.
- Tobler, T. (1854). Dr. Titus Toblers zwei Bucher Topographie von Jerusalem und seinen Umgebungen (in German). Vol. 2. Berlin: G. Reimer.
  - which was supplemented by Beitrag zur medizinischen Topographie von Jerusalem (“A contribution to a medical topography of Jerusalem,” 1855)
- Planographie von Jerusalem (1858)
- Dritte Wanderung nach Palästina (“Third Journey to Palestine,” 1859)
- Bibliographia Geographica Palestinæ (“Geographic bibliography for Palestine,” 1867)
- Nazareth in Palästina (Berlin, 1868)
  - الناصرة في فلسطين (an-Nāṣira fī Filasṭīn). Translated into Arabic by Ziad Abu-Rabia. Independently published, 2025. ISBN 979-8-1914894-5-2.
