= Diocese of Würzburg =

German diocese established in 741

Diocese of Würzburg Dioecesis Herbipolensis Bistum Würzburg

Catholic
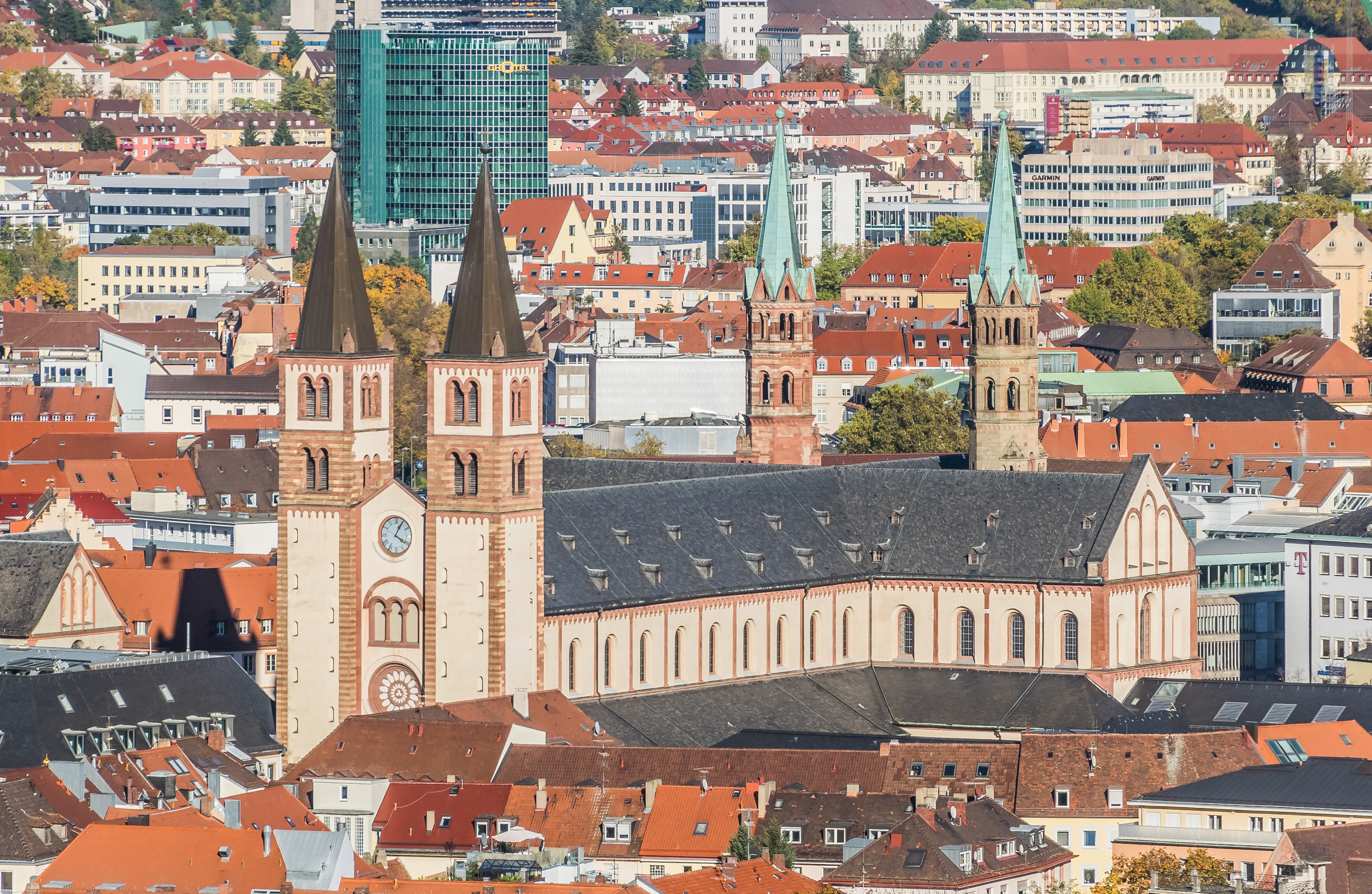
- Würzburg Cathedral

- Coat of arms

Location
- Country: Germany
- Ecclesiastical province: Bamberg
- Metropolitan: Diocese of Bamberg

Statistics
- Area: 8,532 km^{2} (3,294 sq mi)
- Population: Total; Catholics: (as of 2022); 1,320,093; 774,000 (58.6%)
- Parishes: 603

Information
- Denomination: Catholic Church
- Rite: Roman Rite
- Established: 741
- Cathedral: Cathedral of Saints Killian, Colonat, and Totnan (Dom Ss. Killian, Kolonat und Totnan)
- Patron saint: Saint Kilian; Saint Totnan; Saint Colman
- Secular priests: 373 (Diocesan); 129 (Religious Orders); 201 Permanent Deacons

Current leadership
- Bishop: Franz Jung
- Auxiliary Bishops: Paul Reder
- Bishops emeritus: Friedhelm Hofmann; Ulrich Boom

Map
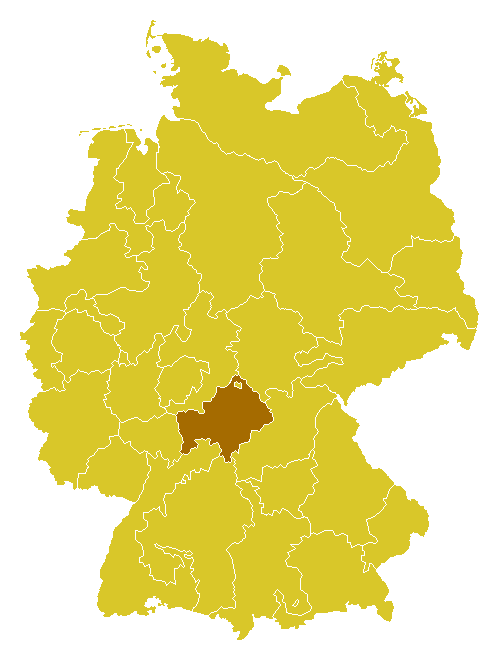
- Diocese of Würzburg

Website
- www.bistum-wuerzburg.de/

The Diocese of Würzburg (Latin: Dioecesis Herbipolensis) is a Latin Church diocese of Catholic Church in Germany. The diocese is located in Lower Franconia, around the city of Würzburg, and the bishop is seated at Würzburg Cathedral. Founded in 741, the diocese lost all temporal power after the Napoleonic wars.

See Prince-Bishopric of Würzburg for more information about the history of the diocese.

== History ==
The first Apostle of Christianity for the territory now included in the Diocese of Würzburg was the Irish missionary, Saint Kilian, the Apostle of Franconia. who converted Gozbert the Frankish duke of Thuringia. In his castle above Würzburg, Gozbert's son Hedan II built the first church dedicated to the Blessed Virgin; on this account the castle received the name of Marienberg. The first mention of Würzburg is in 704, when it is called Castellum Virtebuch. A diocese was established in Würzburg by Saint Boniface, who in 741 consecrated his friend Saint Burchard as bishop; In 742 Pope Zachary confirmed the selection of Burchard. Burchard (741-53) built the first cathedral church, and buried there the bodies of St. Kilian and his companions; he connected with the church a monastery which followed the Rule of St. Benedict.

Carloman (mayor of the palace) gave great gifts of land to the bishopric. In 752 or 753 the church of Würzburg was granted immunity for all its possessions, also secular jurisdiction, whereby the foundation was laid for the future secular authority of the bishops. Like the majority of his successors, Burchard lived at the Marienburg, which he had received from the last duke in exchange for another fortified castle. His successor, Megingoz (753-85), did much towards Christianizing Saxony. Bishop Bernwelf (785-800) replaced the Benedictine secular clergy at the cathedral by the Brothers of St. Kilian, who led a common life after the rule of Chrodegang of Metz. Arno (855-92) rebuilt the cathedral, which had been destroyed by lightning, on the site of the present cathedral.

== List of bishops ==
- Burchard I 741 (or 746, according to the Annales Altahenses) – 755
- Megingoz (Megingold) 753–785
- Berowulf (Bernulf) 786–800
- Liuttrit (Luderich) 800–803
- Egilwart 803–810
- Wolfgar 810–832
- Humbert (Hunbert) 833–842
- Godwald von Henneberg 842–855
- Arno von Endsee 855–892
- Rudolf I von Conradines 892–908
- Theodo von Henneberg 908–931
- Burchard II 932–941
- Poppo I 941–961
- Poppo II 961–983
- Hugo von Rothenburg 983–990
- Bernward von Rothenburg 990–995
- Heinrich I von Rothenburg 995–1018
- Meinhard I von Rothenburg 1018–1034
- Bruno of Carinthia 1034–1045
- Adalbero von Lambach-Wels 1045–1085
- Meinhard II von Rothenburg 1085–1088
- Einhard von Rothenburg 1089–1105
- Rupert von Tundorf 1105–1106
- Erlung von Calw 1106–1121
- Gebhard von Henneberg 1122–1127
- Rudiger von Vaihingen 1122–1125
- Emicho von Leiningen 1125–1146
- Siegfried von Truhendingen 1146–1150
- Gebhard von Henneberg 1150–1159
- Heinrich II von Stuhlingen 1159–1165
- Herold von Hochheim 1165–1170
- Reginhard von Abenberg 1171–1186
- Gottfried I von Spitzenberg-Helfenstein 1186–1190
- Philip of Swabia 1190–1191
- Heinrich III of Berg 1191–1197
- Gottfried II von Hohenlohe 1197
- Konrad von Querfurt 1197–1202
- Heinrich IV von Katzburg 1202–1207
- Otto I. von Lobdeburg 1207–1223
- Dietrich von Homburg 1223–1225
- Hermann I von Lobdeburg 1225–1254
- Iring von Reinstein-Homburg 1254–1266
- Heinrich V von Leiningen 1254–1255
- Poppo III von Trimberg 1267–1271
- Berthold I von Henneberg 1271–1274
- Berthold II von Sternberg 1274–1287
- Mangold von Neuenburg 1287–1303 (Bishop of Bamberg 1285)
- Andreas von Gundelfingen 1303–1313
- Gottfried III von Hohenlohe 1313–1322
- Friedrich von Stolberg 1313–1317
- Wolfram Wolfskeel von Grumbach 1322–1332
- Hermann II Hummel von Lichtenberg 1333–1335
- Otto II von Wolfskeel 1335–1345
- Albrecht I von Hohenberg 1345–1349
- Albrecht II von Hohenlohe 1350–1372
- Gerhard von Schwarzburg 1372–1400
- Albrecht III von Katzburg 1372–1376
- Johann I von Egloffstein 1400–1411
- Johann II von Brunn 1411–1440
- Sigmund of Saxony 1440–1443
- Gottfried Schenk von Limpurg † (19 Nov 1443 Appointed – 1 Apr 1455 Died)
- Johann von Grumbach † (14 Apr 1455 Appointed – 11 Apr 1466 Died)
- Rudolf von Scherenberg † (30 Apr 1466 Appointed – 29 Apr 1495 Died)
- Lorenz von Bibra † (12 May 1495 Appointed – 6 Feb 1519 Died)
- Konrad von Thüngen † (15 Feb 1519 Appointed – 16 Jun 1540 Died)
- Konrad von Bibra † (1 Jul 1540 Appointed – 4 Aug 1544 Died)
- Melchior Zobel von Giebelstadt † (Aug 1544 Appointed – 15 Apr 1558 Died)
- Friedrich von Wirsberg † (27 Apr 1558 Appointed – 12 Nov 1573 Died)
- Julius Echter von Mespelbrunn † (1 Dec 1573 Appointed – 9 Sep 1617 Died)
- Johann Gottfried von Aschhausen † (5 Oct 1617 Appointed – 29 Dec 1622 Died)
- Philipp Adolf von Ehrenberg † (6 Feb 1623 Appointed – 16 Jul 1631 Died)
- Franz Graf von Hatzfeld † (7 Aug 1631 Appointed – 30 Jul 1642 Died)
- Johann Philipp Reichsgraf von Schönborn † (16 Aug 1642 Appointed – 12 Feb 1673 Died)
- Johann Hartmann Reichsritter von Rosenbach † (13 Mar 1673 Appointed – 19 Apr 1675 Died)
- Peter Philipp Reichsgraf von Dernbach † (Jul 1675 Appointed – 24 Apr 1683 Died)
- Konrad Wilhelm Reichsfreiherr von Wernau † (31 May 1683 Appointed – 5 Sep 1684 Died)
- Johann Gottfried II von Gutenberg † (16 Oct 1684 Appointed – 14 Dec 1698 Died)
- Johann Philipp Reichsfreiherr von Greifenclau zu Vollraths † (9 Feb 1699 Appointed – 3 Aug 1719 Died)
- Johann Philipp Franz Reichsgraf von Schönborn † (18 Sep 1719 Appointed – 18 Aug 1724 Died)
- Christoph Franz Reichsfreiherr von Hutten † (2 Oct 1724 Appointed – 25 Mar 1729 Died)
- Friedrich Karl Reichsgraf von Schönborn † (18 May 1729 Appointed – 26 Jul 1746 Died)
- Anselm Franz Reichsgraf von Ingelheim † (29 Aug 1746 Appointed – 9 Feb 1749 Died)
- Karl Philipp Reichsfreiherr von Greifenclau zu Vollraths † (14 Apr 1749 Appointed – 25 Nov 1754 Died)
- Adam Friedrich Reichsgraf von Seinsheim † (7 Jan 1755 Appointed – 18 Feb 1779 Died)
- Franz Ludwig Reichsfreiherr von Erthal † (18 Mar 1779 Appointed – 14 Feb 1795 Died)
- Georg Karl Ignaz Freiherr von Fechenbach zu Laudenbach † (12 Mar 1795 Appointed – 9 Apr 1808 Died)
- Adam Friedrich Freiherr von Groß zu Trockau † (6 Sep 1818 Appointed – 21 Mar 1840 Died)
- Georg Anton von Stahl † (17 Apr 1840 Appointed – 13 Jul 1870 Died)
- Johann Valentin von Reißmann † (26 Oct 1870 Appointed – 17 Nov 1875 Died)
- Franz Joseph von Stein † (19 Oct 1878 Appointed – 24 Dec 1897 Appointed, Archbishop of Munich and Freising {Munich})
- Ferdinand von Schlör † (5 Mar 1898 Appointed – 2 Jun 1924 Died)
- Matthias Ehrenfried † (30 Sep 1924 Appointed – 30 May 1948 Died)
- Julius August Döpfner † (11 Aug 1948 Appointed – 15 Jan 1957 Appointed, Bishop of Berlin)
- Josef Stangl † (27 June 1957 appointed – 8 January 1979 resigned)
- Paul-Werner Scheele † (31 August 1979 appointed – 14 July 2003 retired)
- Friedhelm Hofmann (25 June 2004 appointed – 18 September 2017 retired)
- Franz Jung (16 February 2018 – )
