= John III of Grumbach =

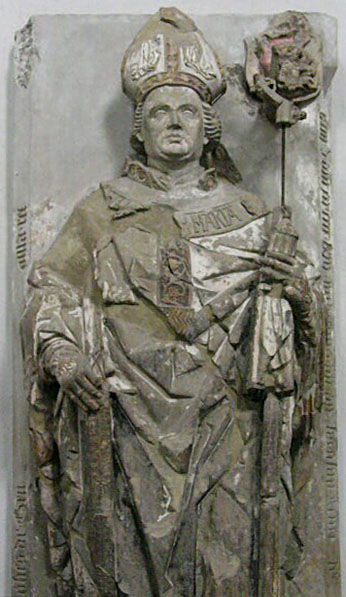
John III of Grumbach, grave sculpture in Wurzburg Cathedral

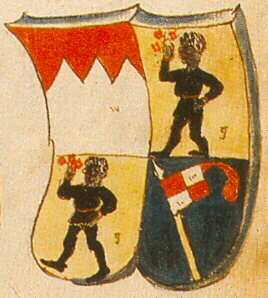
Multiple prince-bishop's coat of arms in the Ingeram Codex

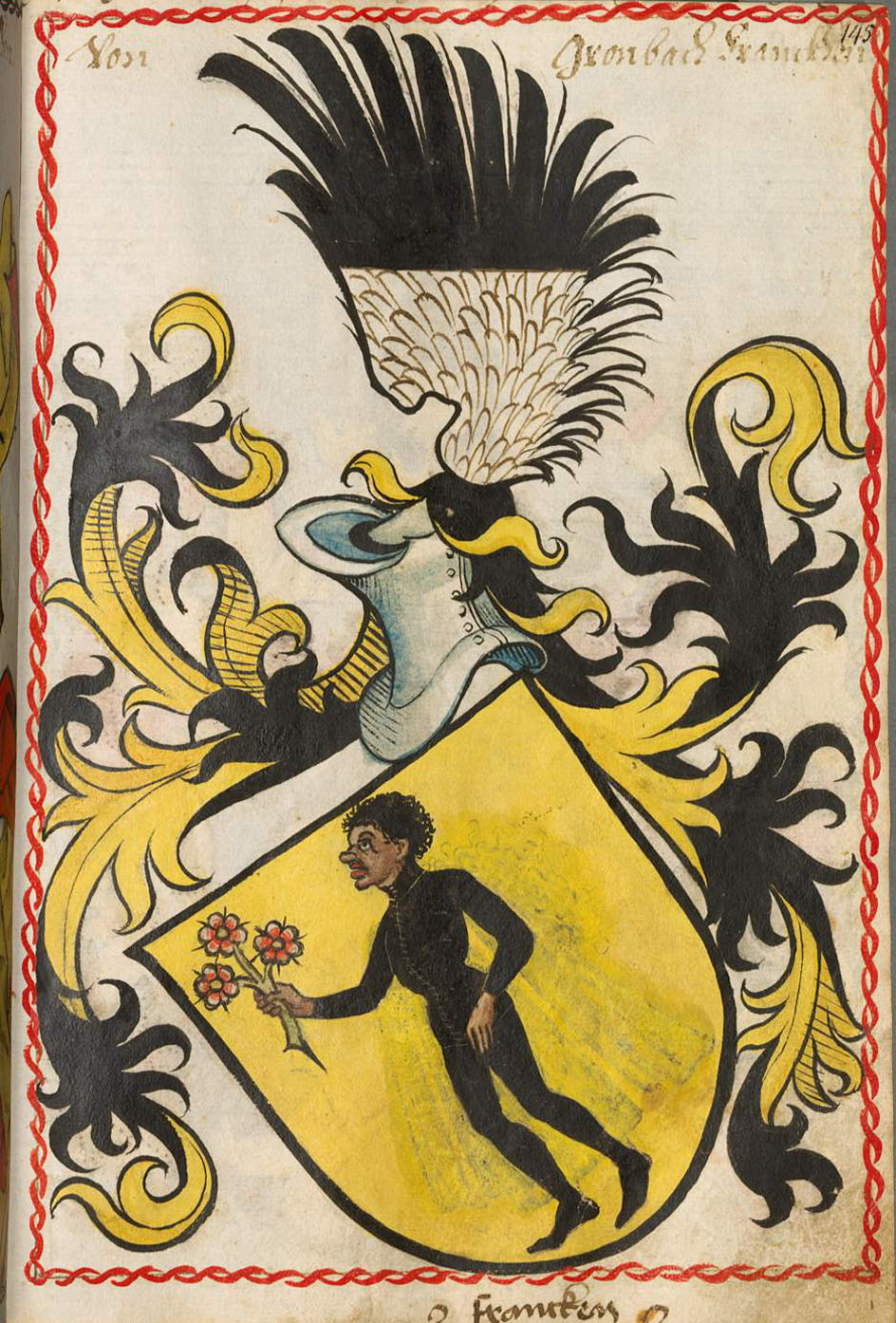
Coat of arms of the House of Grumbach according to the Scheibler Coat of Arms book. John III continued it in a multiple coat of arms.

John of Grumbach (German: Johann von Grumbach) (?–1466) was prince-bishop of Würzburg as "John III" from 1455 until his death in 1466.

== Literature ==
- Theodor Henner (1881). "Johann III. von Grumbach, Bischof von Würzburg" . Allgemeine Deutsche Biographie (in German). Vol. 14. Leipzig: Duncker & Humblot. pp. 450–451.
- Alfred Wendehorst: Das Bistum Würzburg Teil 3 - Die Bischofsreihe von 1455 bis 1617. (= Germania Sacra; Neue Folge 13). Berlin, 1969. pp. 3–20 (digitalised)
- Alfred Wendehorst (1974). "Johann III. von Grumbach". Neue Deutsche Biographie (in German). Vol. 10. Berlin: Duncker & Humblot. pp. 545–546. (full text online).

Preceded by Gottfried IV Schenk of Limpurg	Prince-Bishop of Würzburg; 1455–1466	Succeeded by Rudolf von Scherenberg
