= Megingoz of Würzburg =

Megingoz (or Megingod, Megingaud, Megingold, Mengold) was the second bishop of Würzburg from 753 until his retirement in 768.

Three manuscripts emanating from the scriptorium of Würzburg can be dated to his episcopate. At that time, Würzburg was still part of the circle of German monasteries founded by Saint Boniface. His successor was Berowulf, who brought the diocese into closer relations with the ruling Carolingian dynasty.

Megingoz and Boniface's successor, Lullus, Archbishop of Mainz, together commissioned Willibald to write the Vita Bonifatii ("Life of Boniface"), the earliest biography of the missionary bishop. Willibald claims in his preface to have relied in part on Megingoz's firsthand testimony. Boniface's mentions a deacon named Megingoz in a letter of 737/738 concerning the abbey of Fritzlar, where Megingoz was probably a monk. Megingoz was also a witness, along with Lullus, of the founding of the abbey of Fulda.

Three letters of Megingoz to Lullus survive. They show him to have been concerned particularly with the permissibility of divorce in cases of adultery or forced marriage. He apparently found Augustine and Jerome inconsistent on the matter, but Lullus' response is unknown. In one letter he even asked Lullus to help discourage a relative of his from entering a monastery, because he believed his relative did not have the required constancy (stabilitas). In Liudger's Vita Gregorii of c. 800, Megingoz is described as venerabilis pater, "venerable father".

== Sources ==
- Boniface (1976) [1940]. Ephraim Emerton (ed.). The Letters of Saint Boniface. New York: Norton.
- McKitterick, Rosamond (1983). The Frankish Kingdoms under the Carolingians, 751–987. London: Longman.
- Palmer, James (2005). "The 'Vigorous Rule' of Bishop Lull: Between Bonifatian Mission and Carolingian Church Control". Early Medieval Europe. 13 (3): 249–76. doi:10.1111/j.1468-0254.2005.00158.x.
