= Marienkirche, Würzburg =

Coordinates: 49.79015°N 9.918459°E

Marienkirche
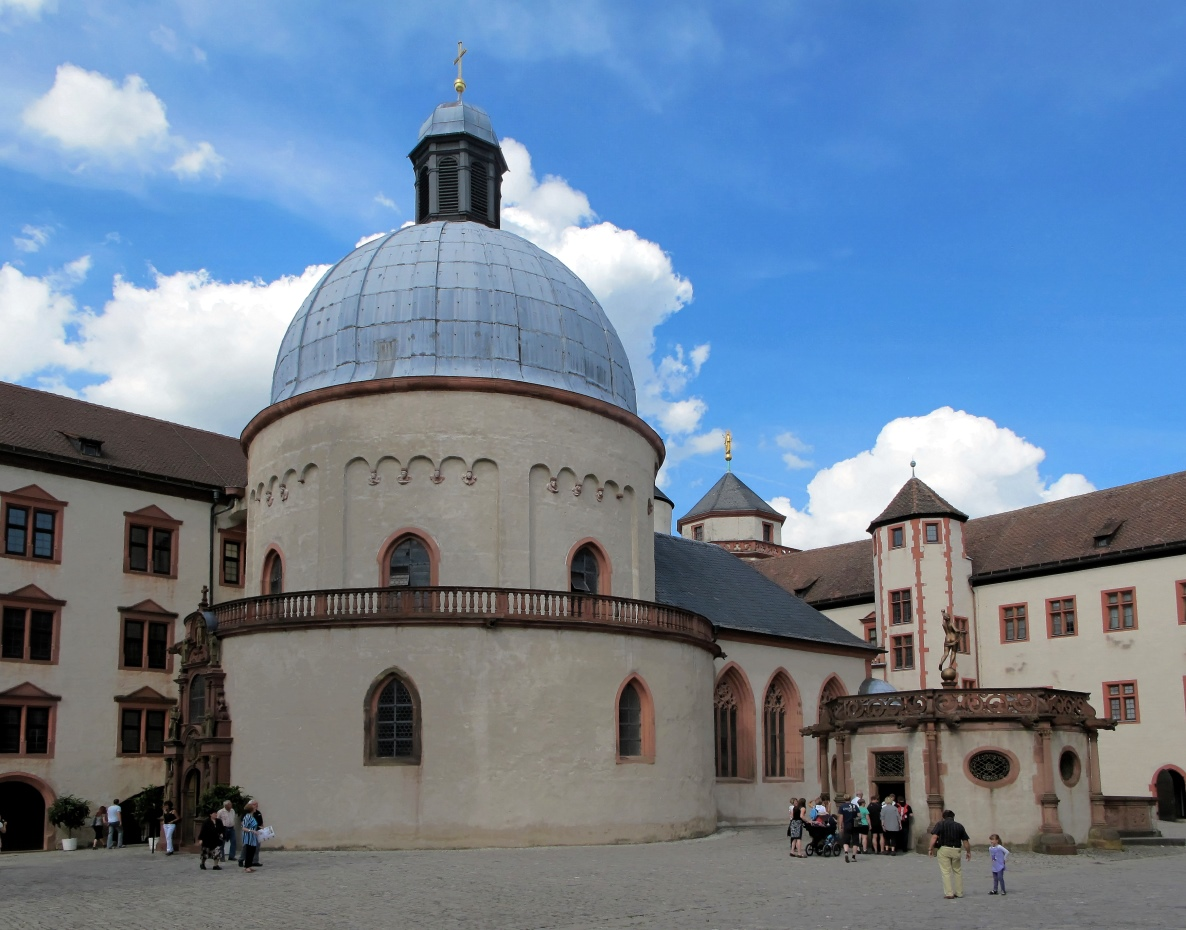
- Marienkirche
- Location: Marienberg Fortress
- Country: Germany
- Denomination: Roman Catholic

Architecture
- Style: Romanesque, Gothic, Renaissance

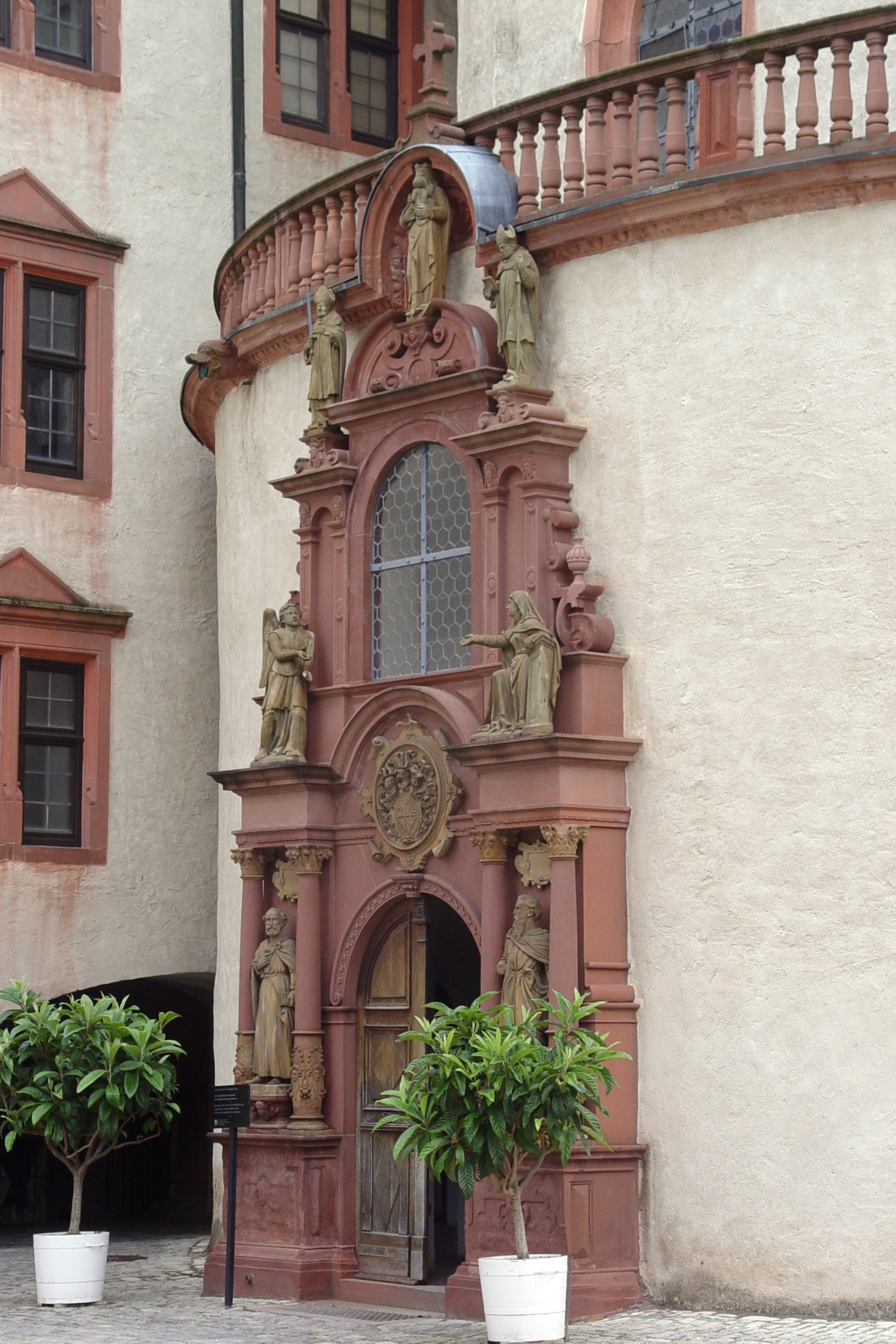
The red sandstone portal of the Marienkirche

Architectural plan of church

Side view architectural slice of church

The Marienkirche, Würzburg (Saint Mary's Church) is a chapel located in the inner court of Marienberg Fortress in Würzburg, Bavaria. The first Christian church at this location was built in 706 by Duke Hedan II. The structure of today's building can be traced back to the early 11th century. It is the oldest church in Würzburg and the oldest building in the fortress.

== History ==
Duke Hedan II erected a small church in the year 706, which was dedicated to the virgin Mary. It was the cathedral and burial site of the Würzburg bishops until the remains of the martyrs Saint Kilian, Saint Colman und Saint Totnan were relocated to the new Würzburg Cathedral on the other side of the Main river in 788. The Marienkirche was officially transferred to St. Burchard's Abbey in 983.

When Heinrich I was bishop, he built a new church at this location in the early 11th century, which potentially used some of the original structure and became a pilgrimage church. During the time of Konrad von Querfurt it became the church of the court (Hofkirche) of the princes (Fürsten) of Würzburg in 1200. He made substantial changes to the building, when he increased the height of the cylindrical part and installed larger windows. After a fire in 1600, the building was re-erected by Prince-Bishop Julius Echter. He extended the presbytery, built a parapet and put a lantern on top of the cupola, which contains the church bells. The interior was modernised with plasterwork in Renaissance style.

== Description ==
=== Portal ===
The ornamental portal was made from red sandstone, when Julius Echter was bishop, as indicated by his coat of arms. It displays figures of the apostles Saint Peter and Saint Paul, and above them the annunciation and finally the bishops Kilian und Burchard of Würzburg and a madonna. The design is still Renaissance style but already reflects early Baroque influences.

Under Echter's rule, a choir (known as the Echterchor) was also added to the church.

=== Graves ===
Twenty grave plates remain in the centre of the church, which show reliefs of the Würzburg bishops. The church was the traditional burial place for the prince-bishops' entrails. Their bodies were typically buried at the cathedral and their hearts at Ebrach Abbey.

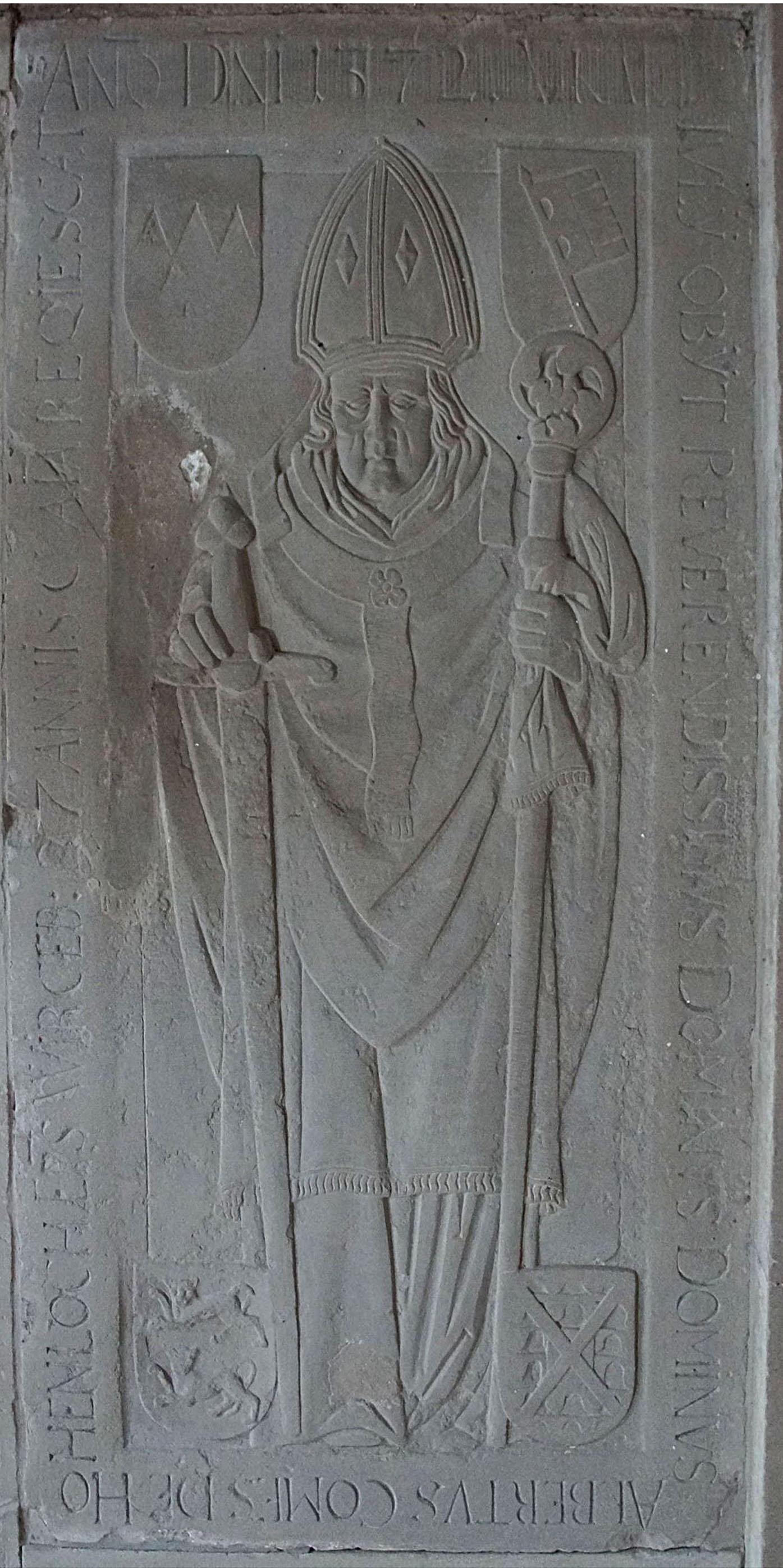
Albrecht II. von Hohenlohe
died 1372

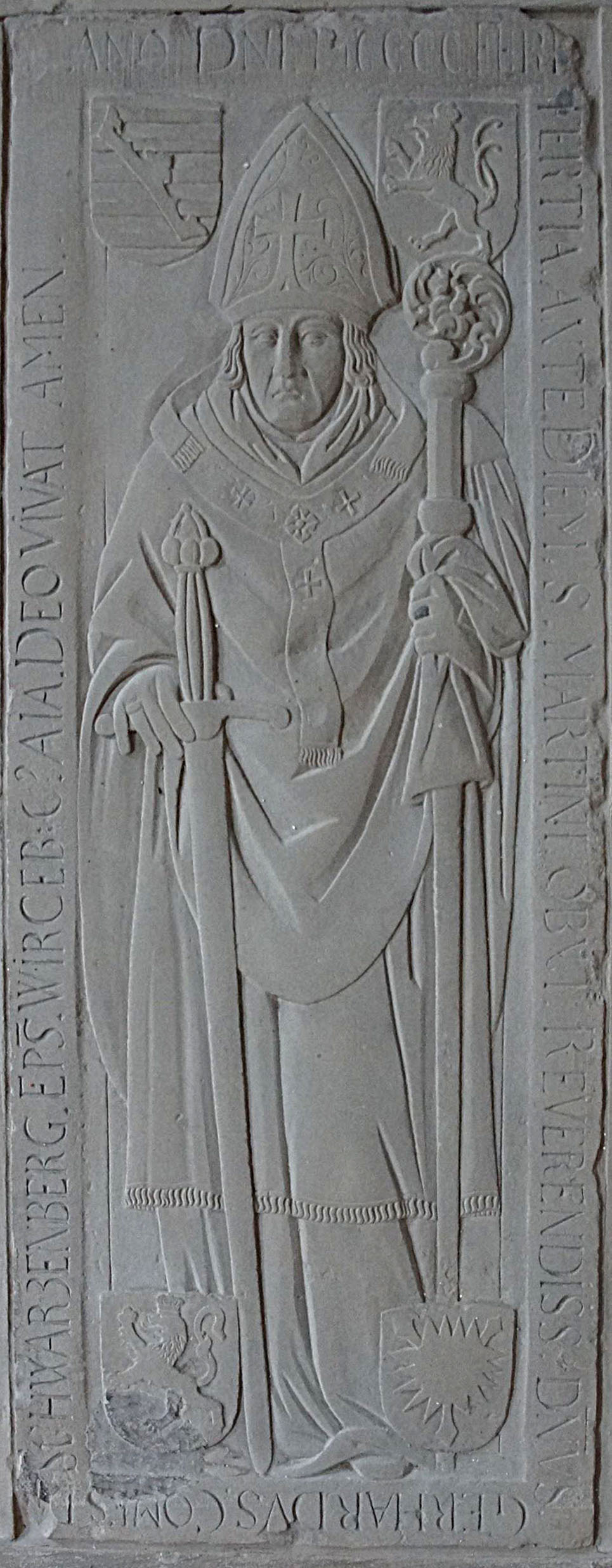
Gerhard von Schwarzburg
1440–1443

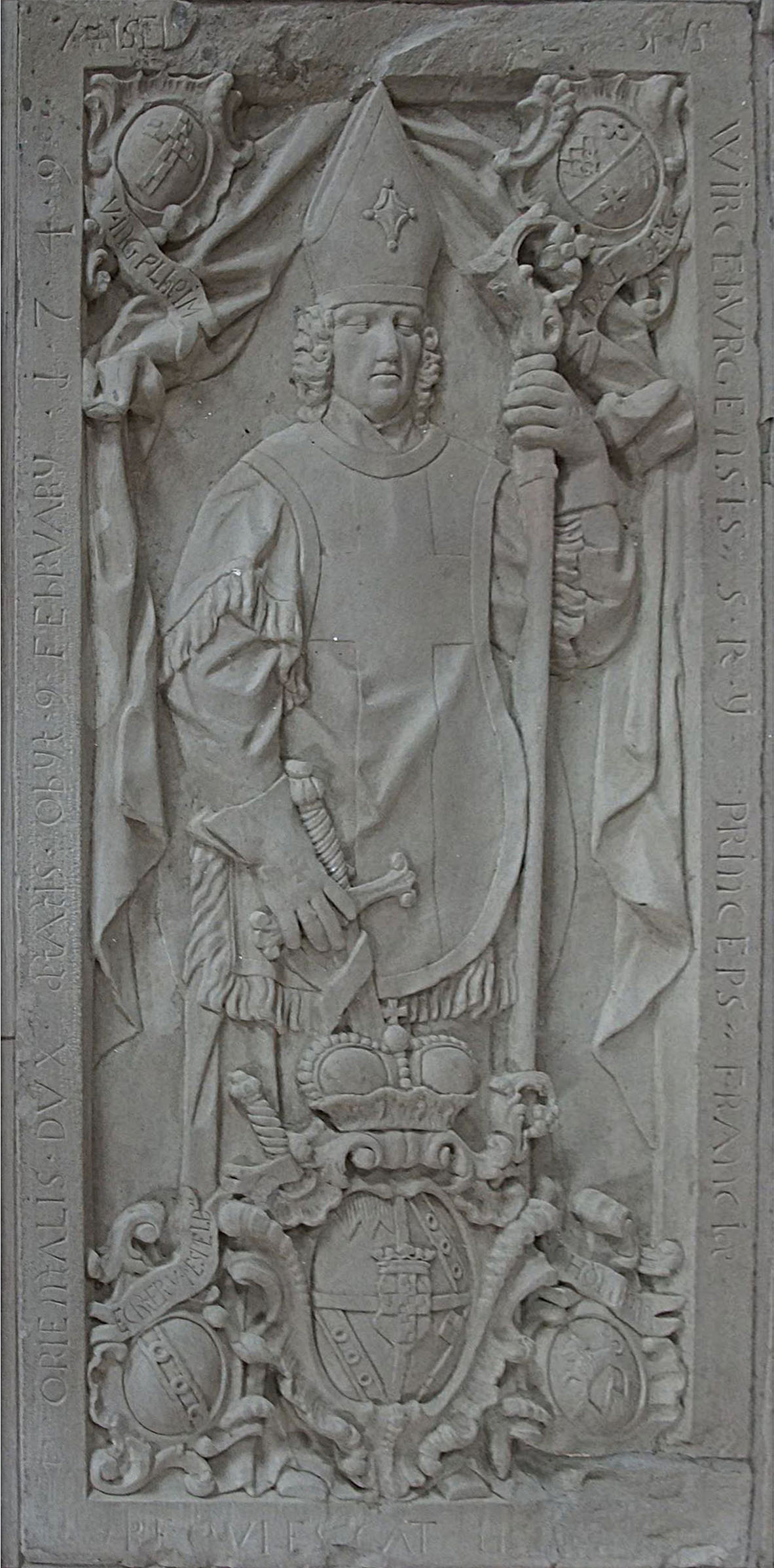
Anselm Franz von Ingelheim
1746–1749

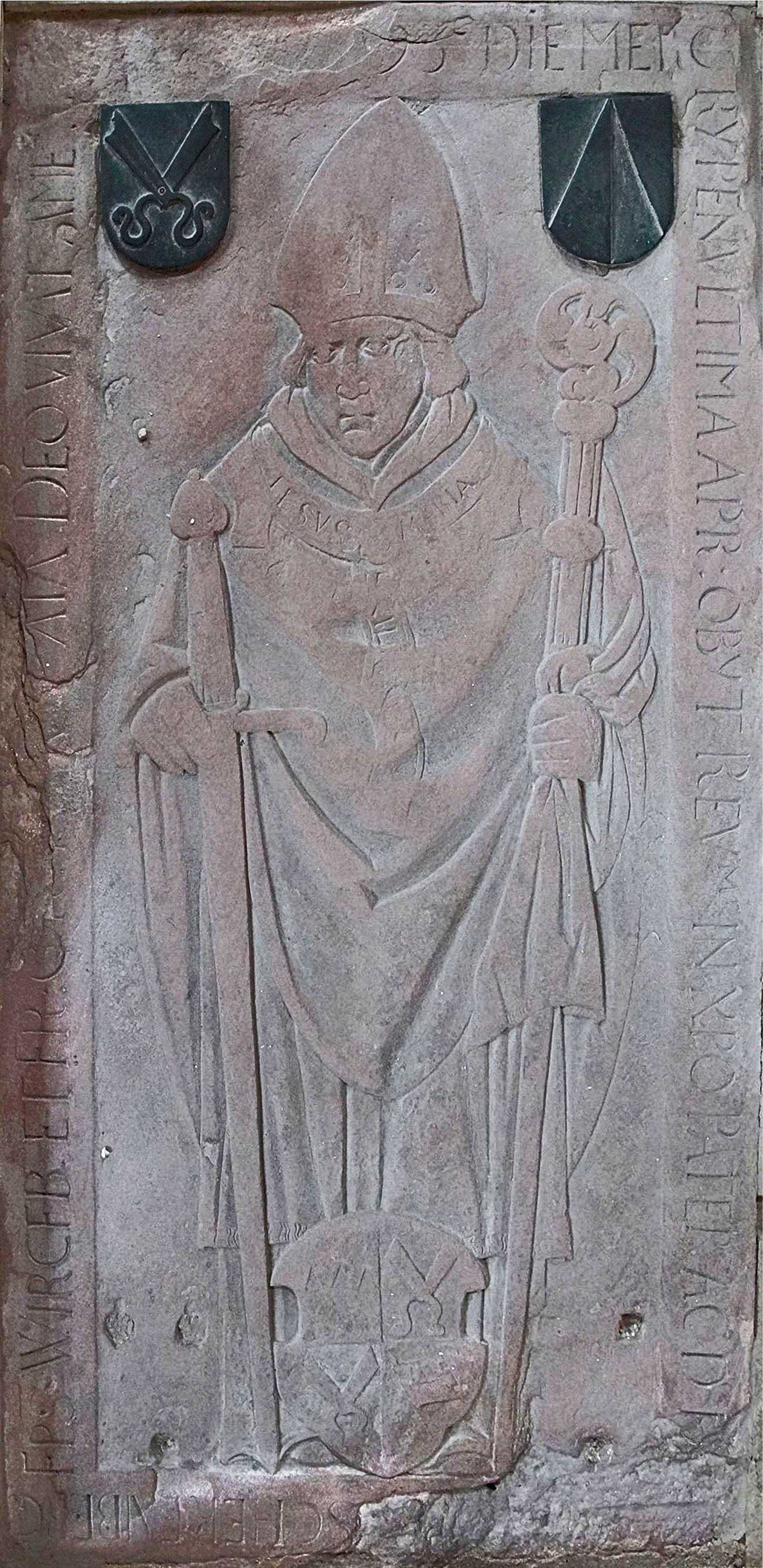
Rudolf II. von Scherenberg
1466–1495

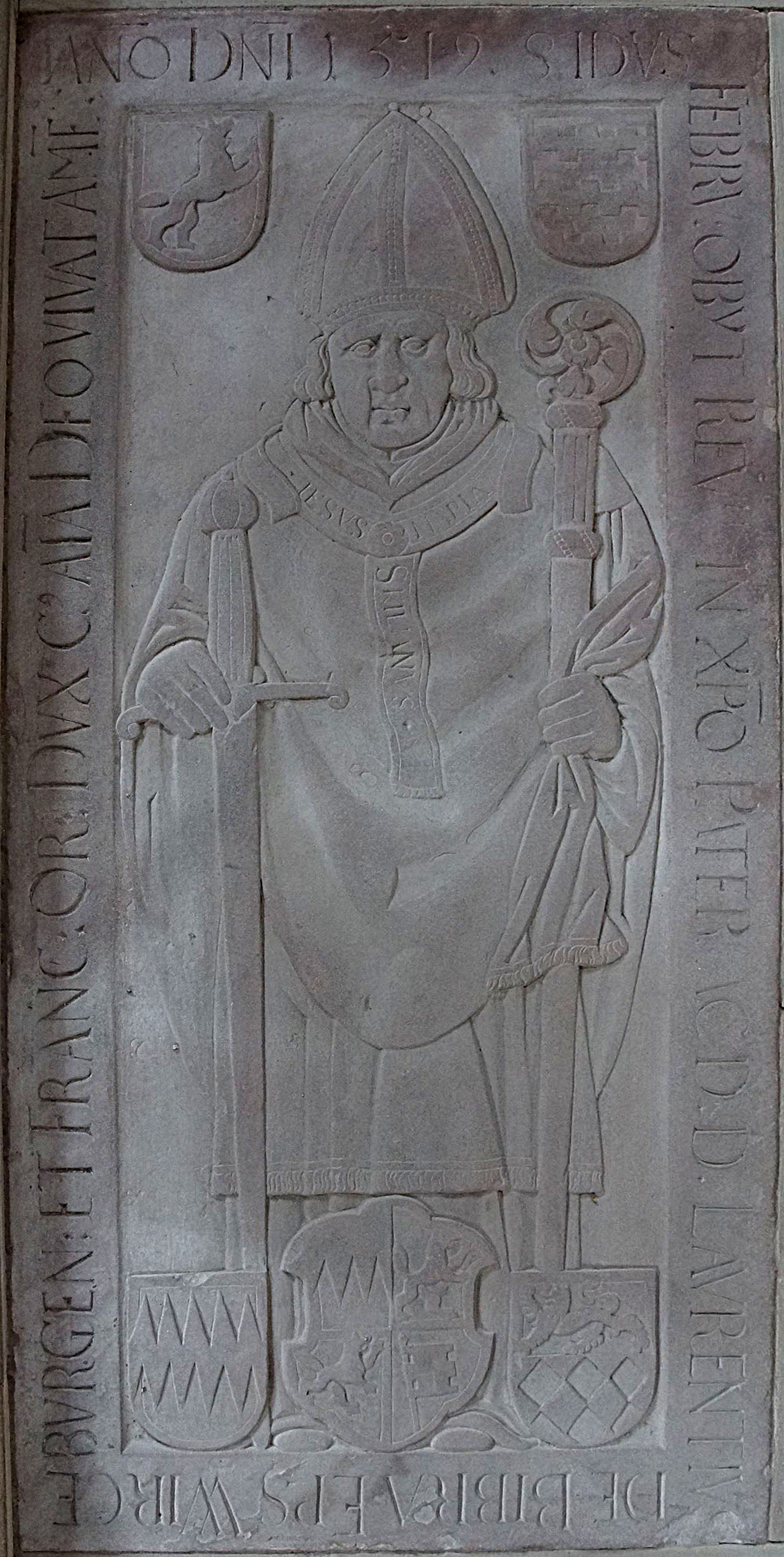
Lorenz von Bibra
1495–1519

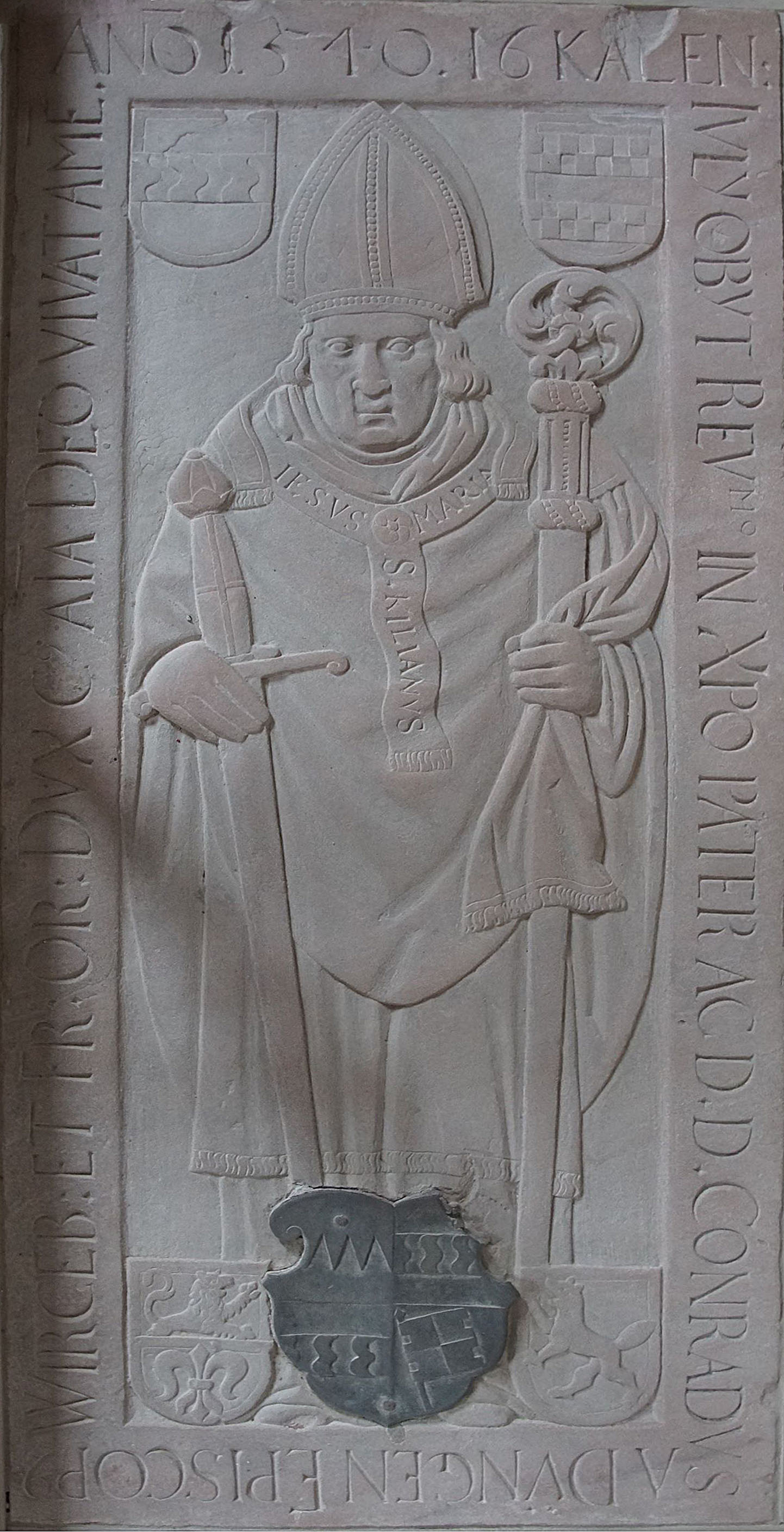
Konrad II. von Thüngen
1519–1540

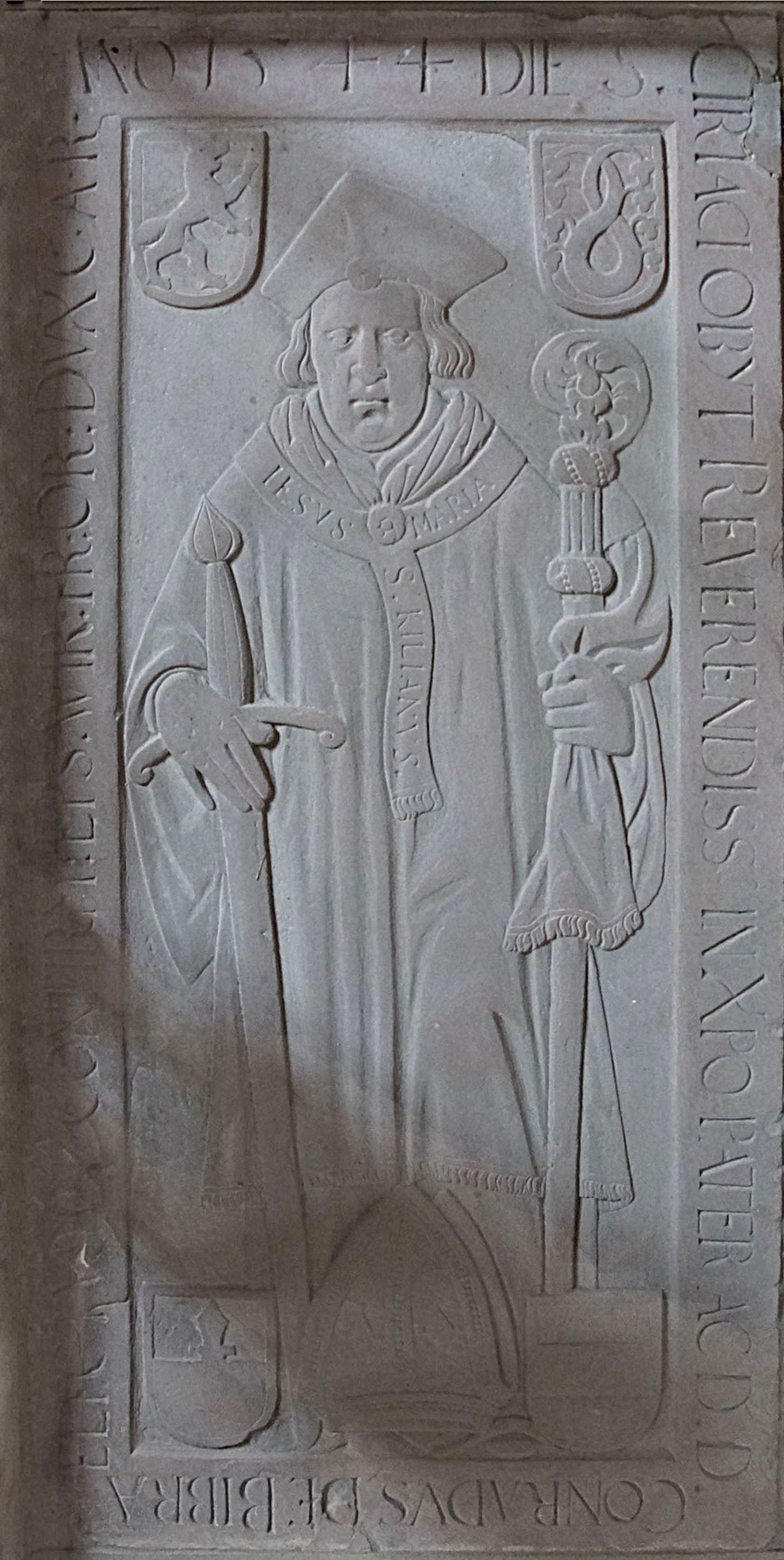
Konrad III. von Bibra
1540–1544

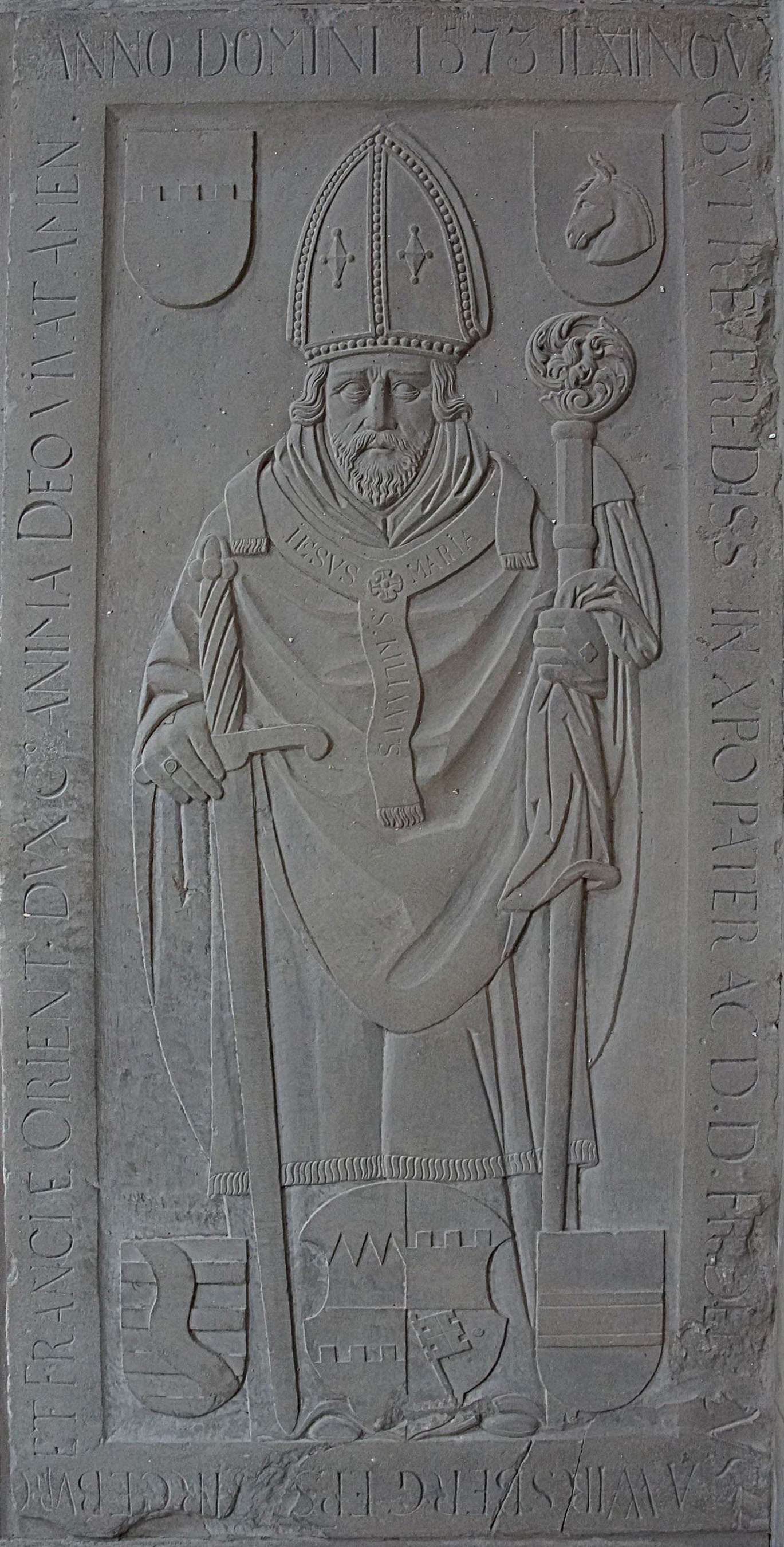
Friedrich von Wirsberg
1558–1573

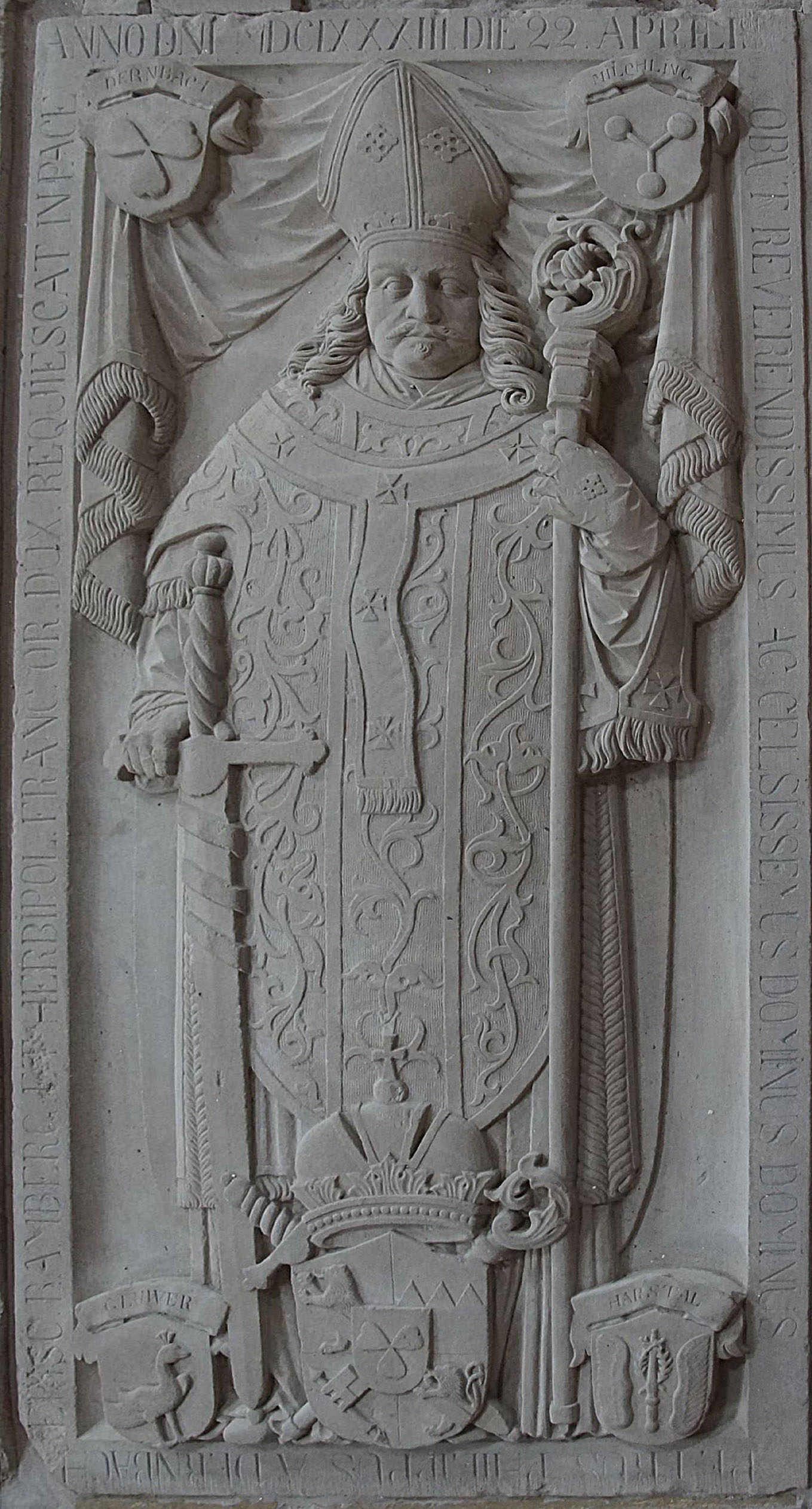
Peter Philipp von Dernbach gen. Graul
1675–1683

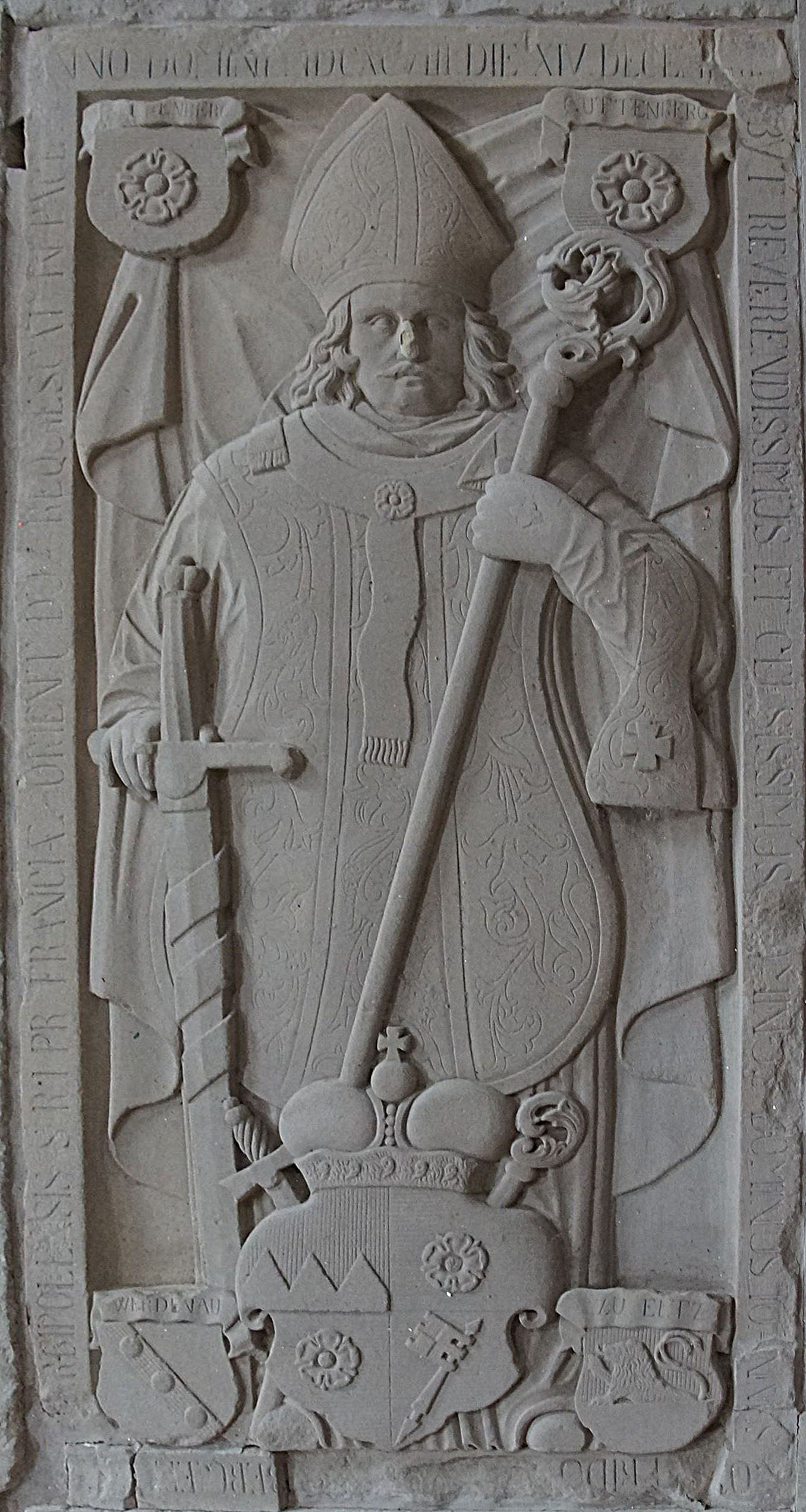
Johann Gottfried von Guttenberg
1684–1698

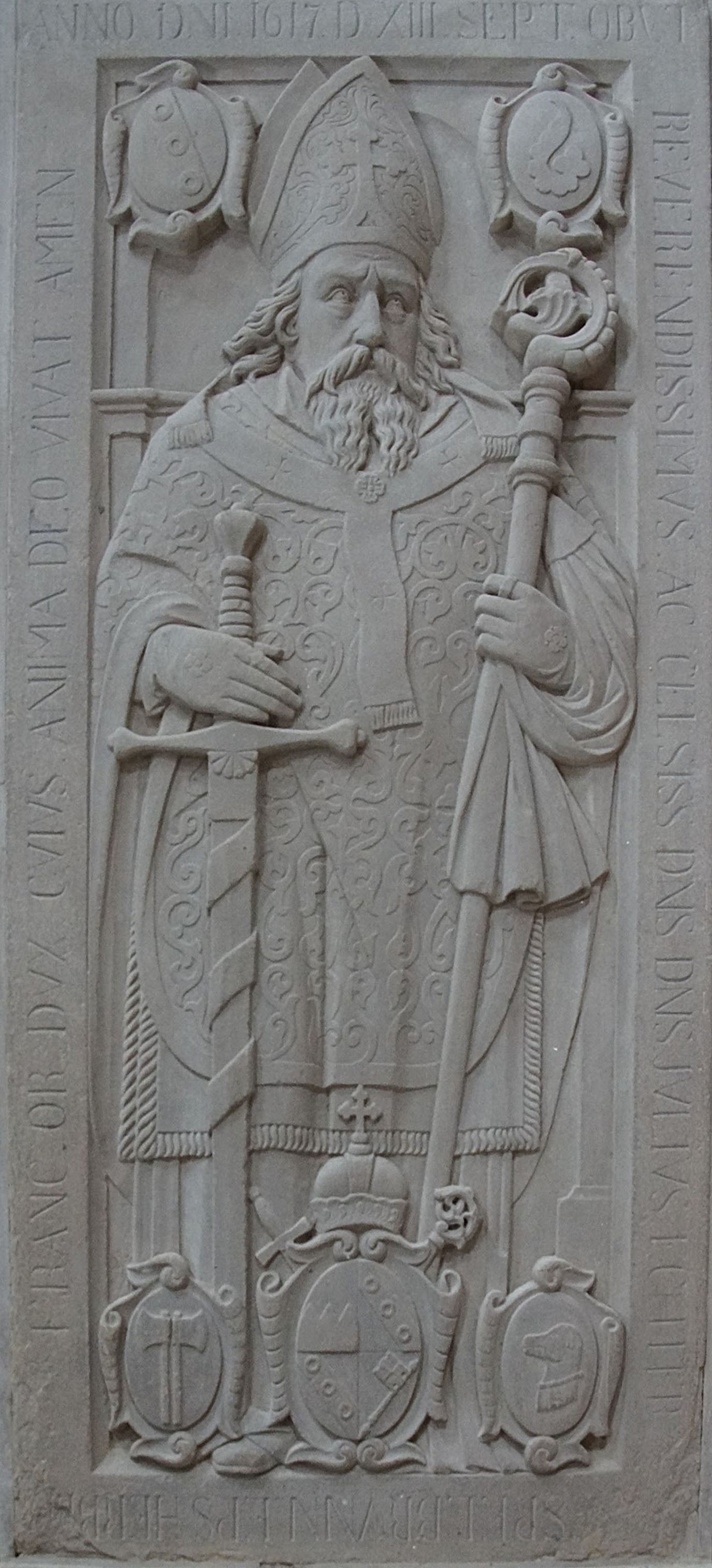
Julius Echter von Mespelbrunn
1573–1617

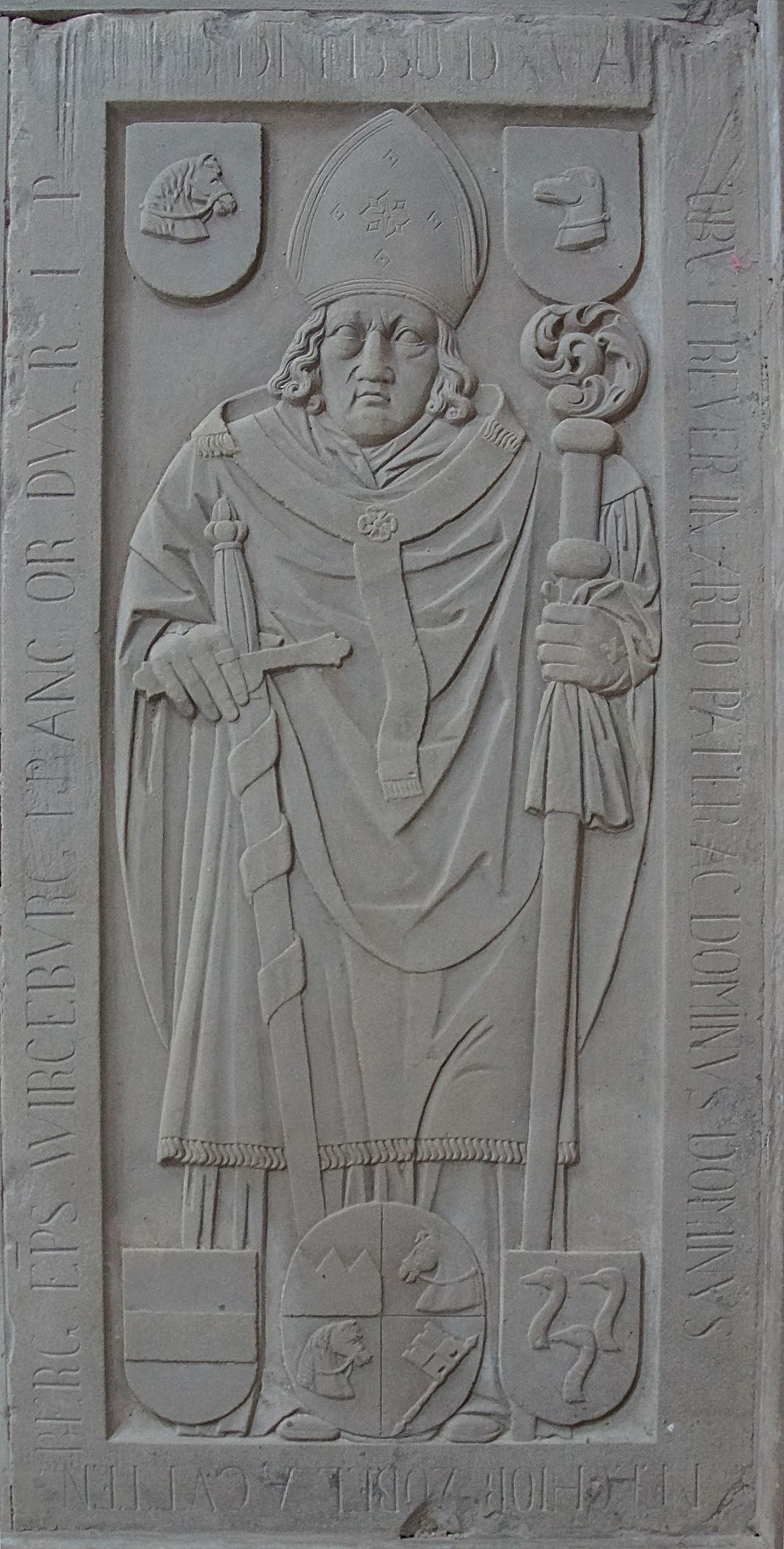
Melchior Zobel von Giebelstadt
1544–1558

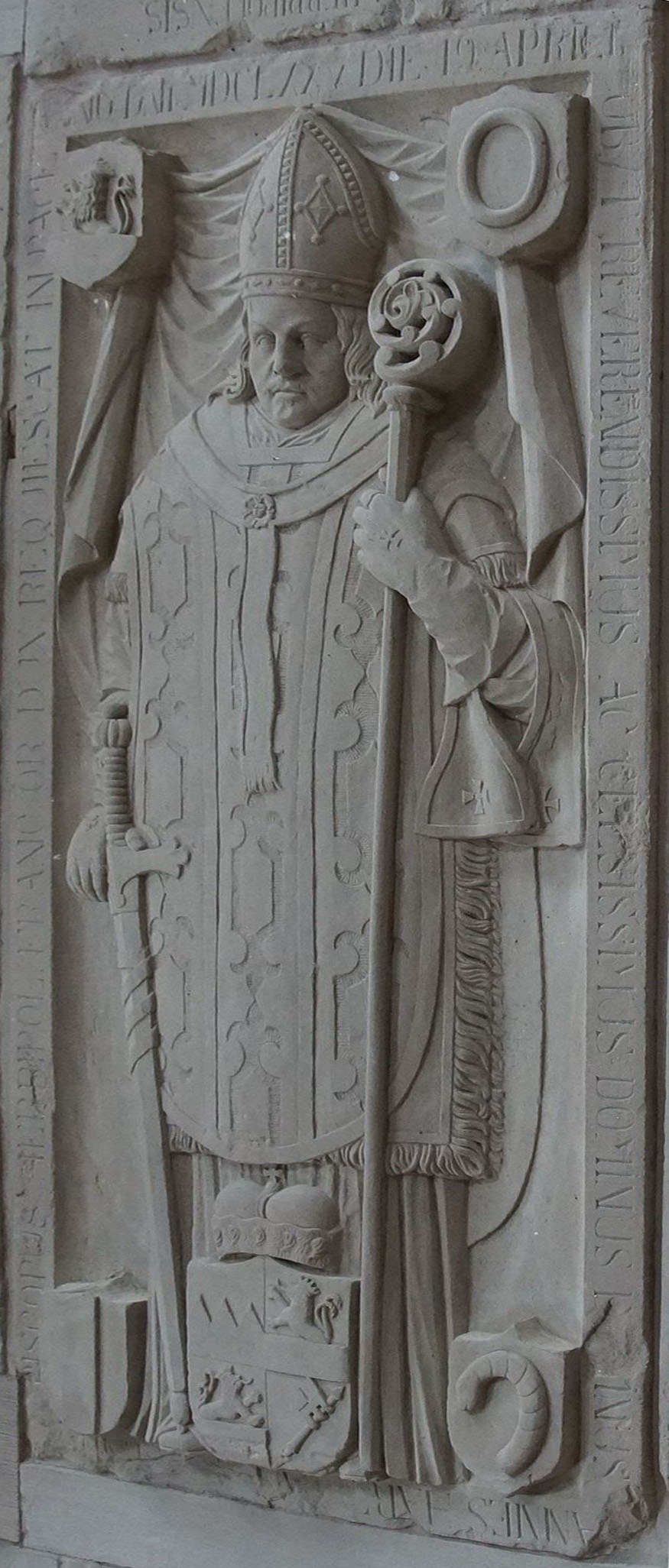
Johann Hartmann von Rosenbach
1609–1675

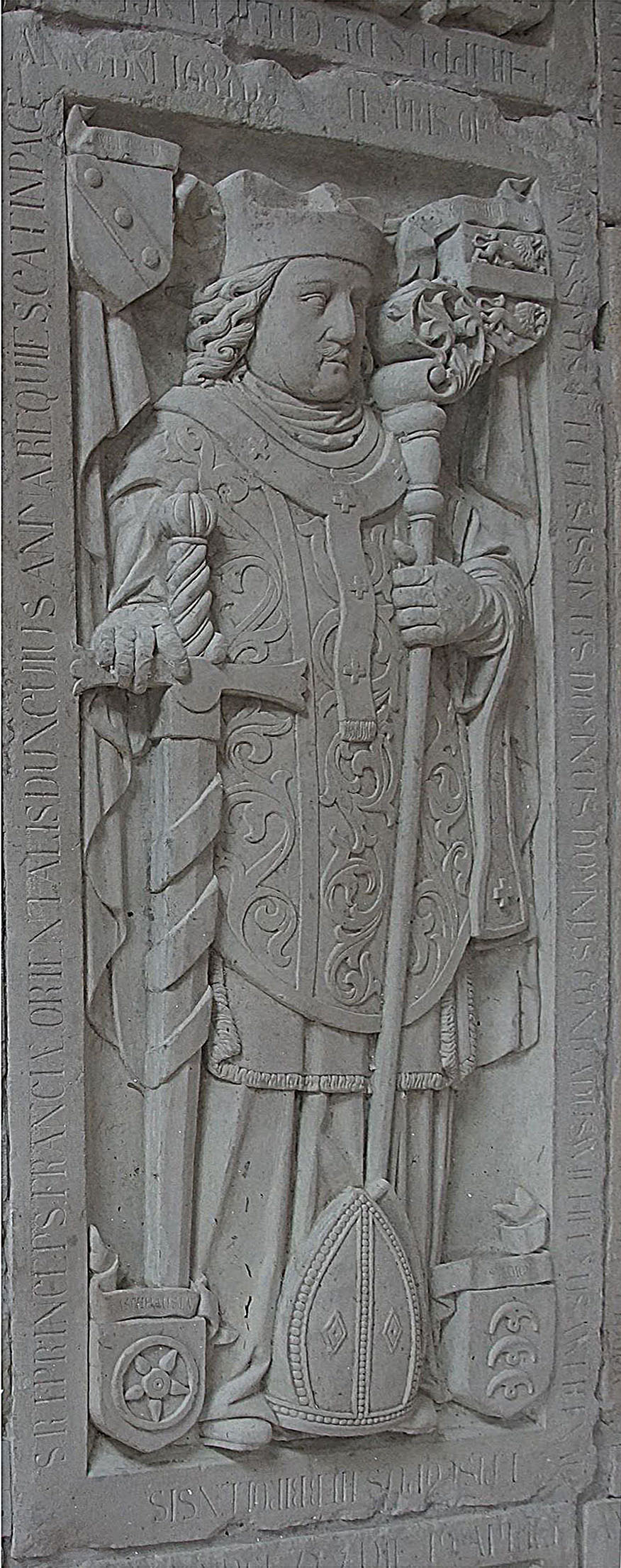
Konrad Wilhelm von Wernau
1683–1684

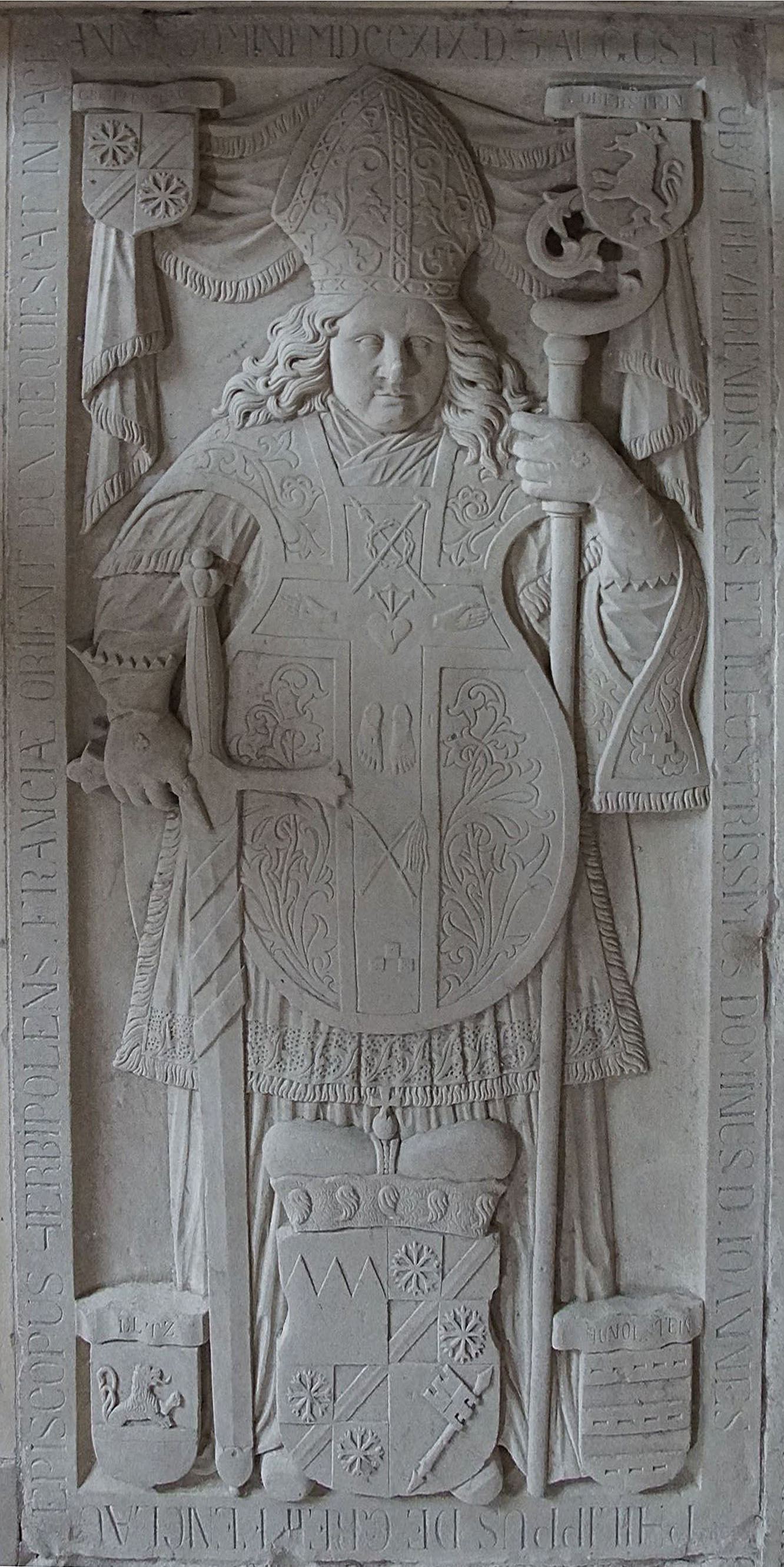
Johann Philipp von Greifenclau zu Vollraths
1699–1719

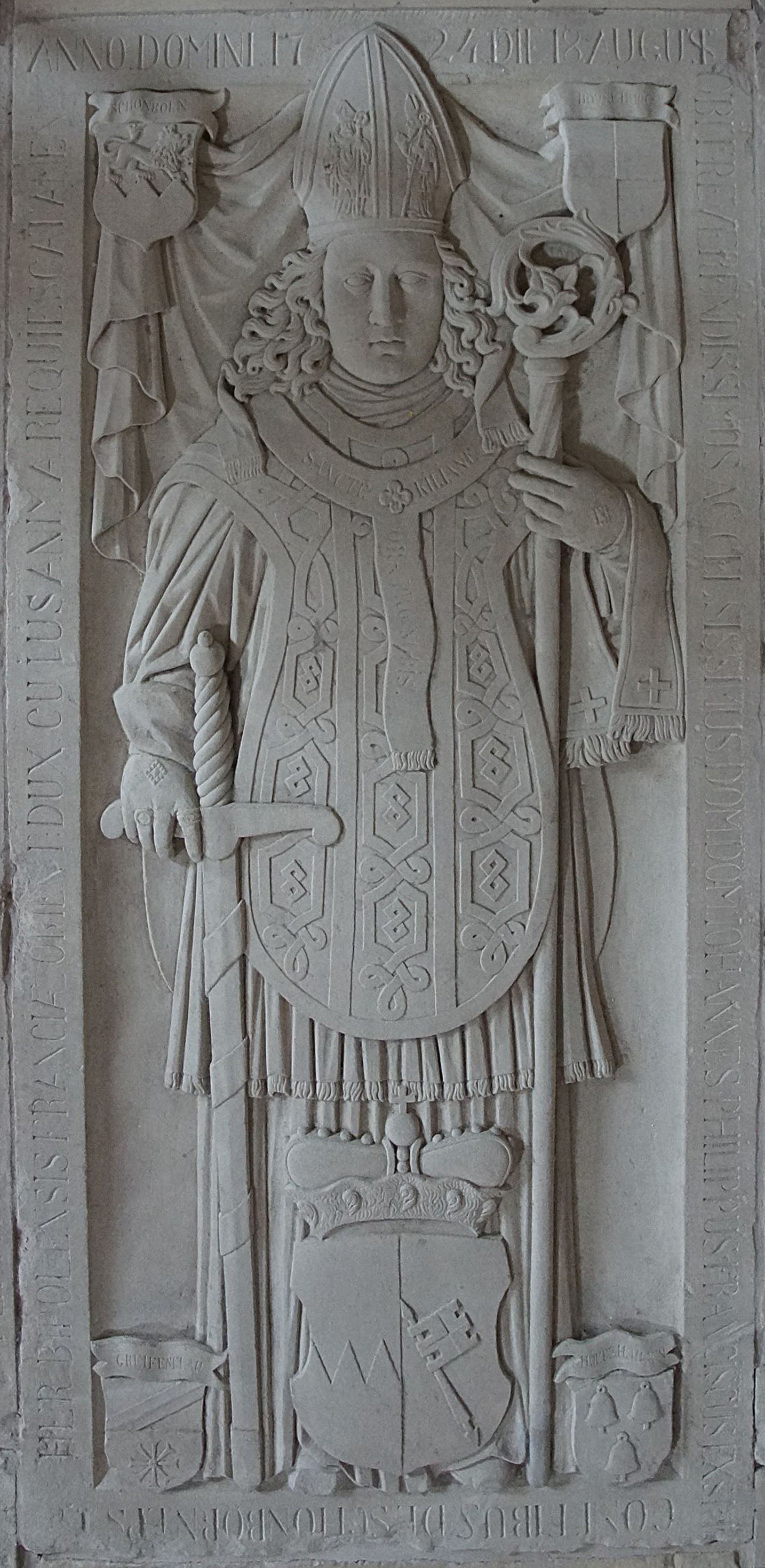
Johann Philipp Franz von Schönborn
1719–1724

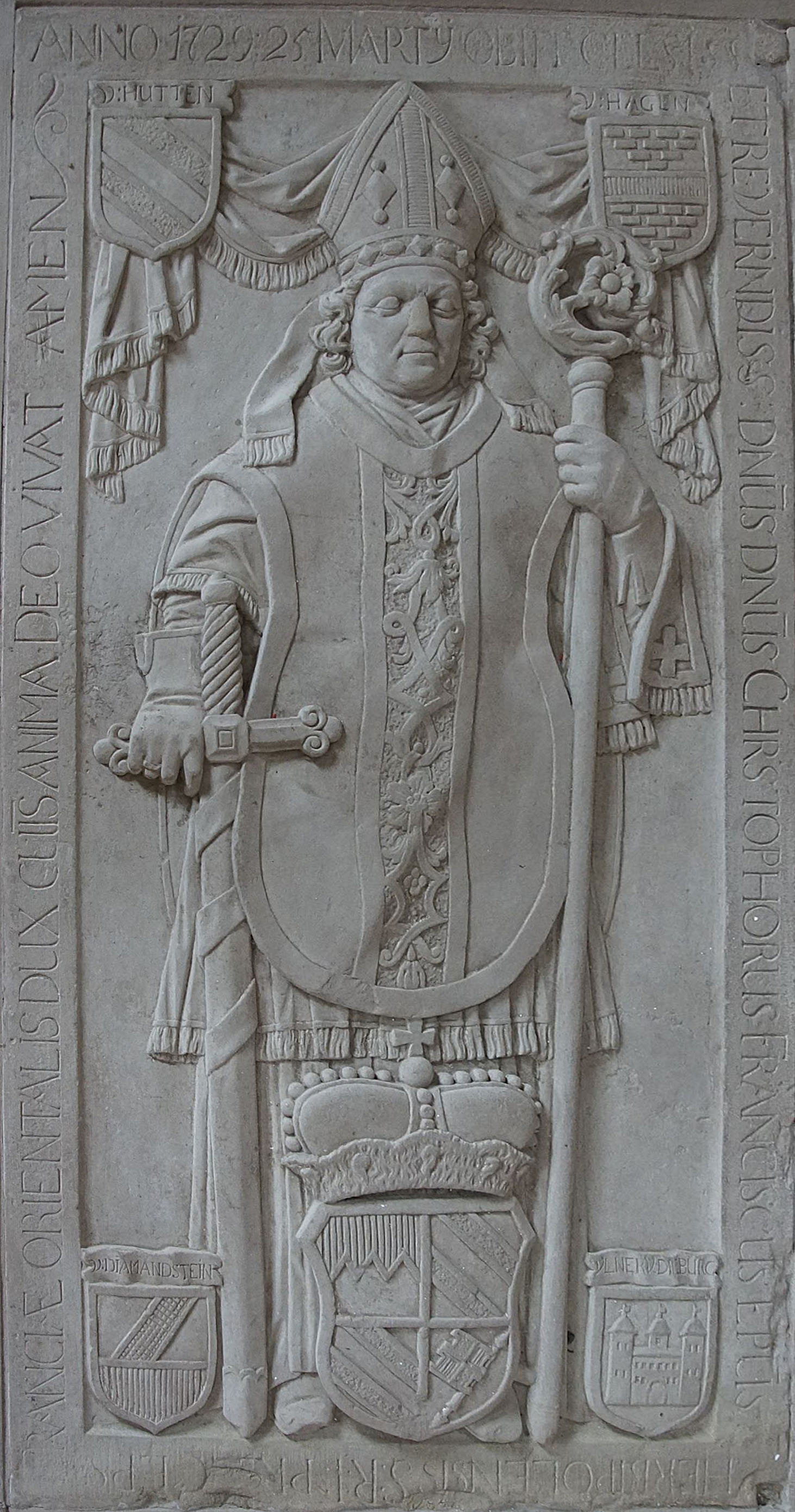
Christoph Franz von Hutten
1724–1729

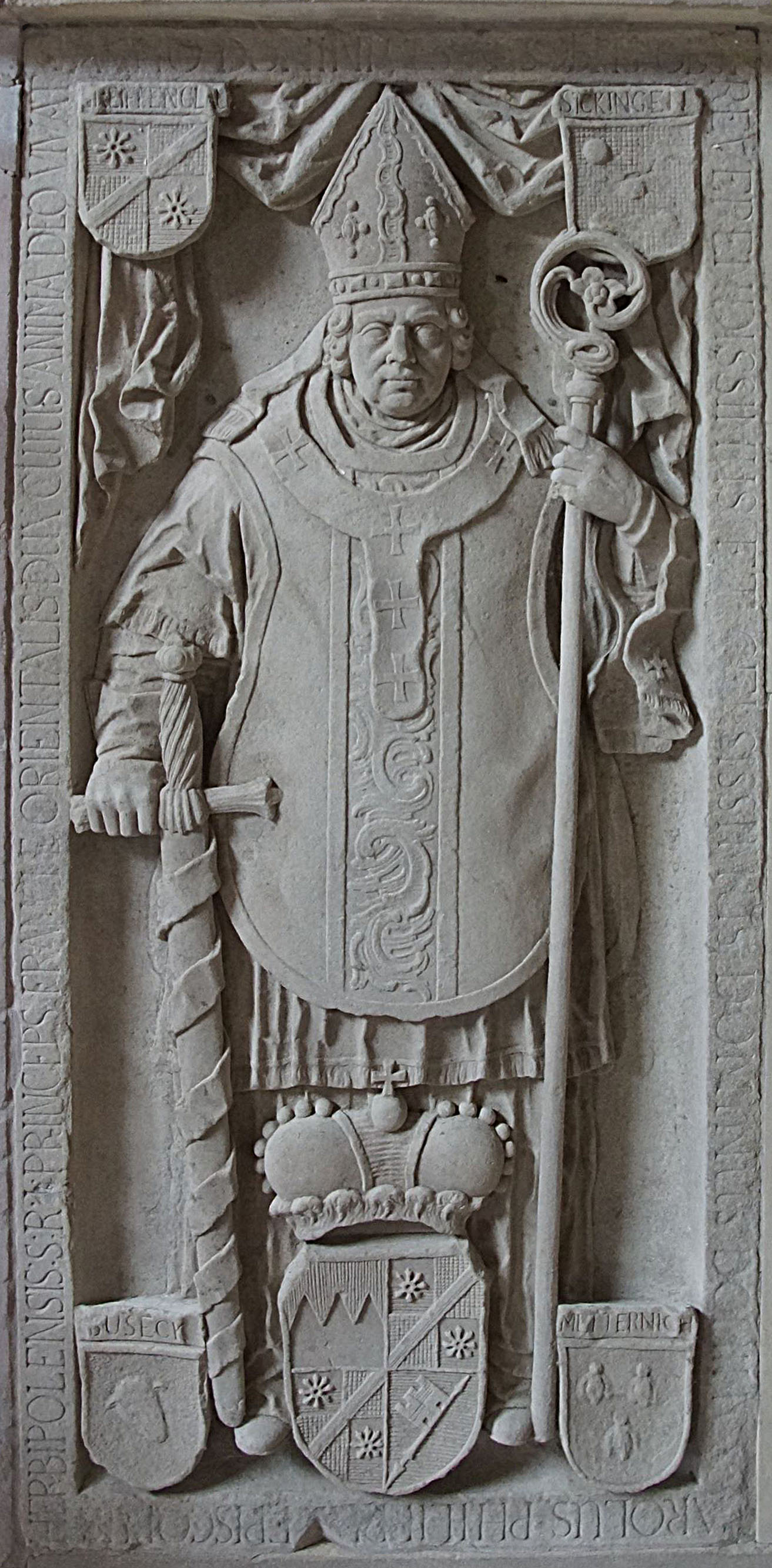
Karl Philipp von Greiffenclau zu Vollraths
1749–1754

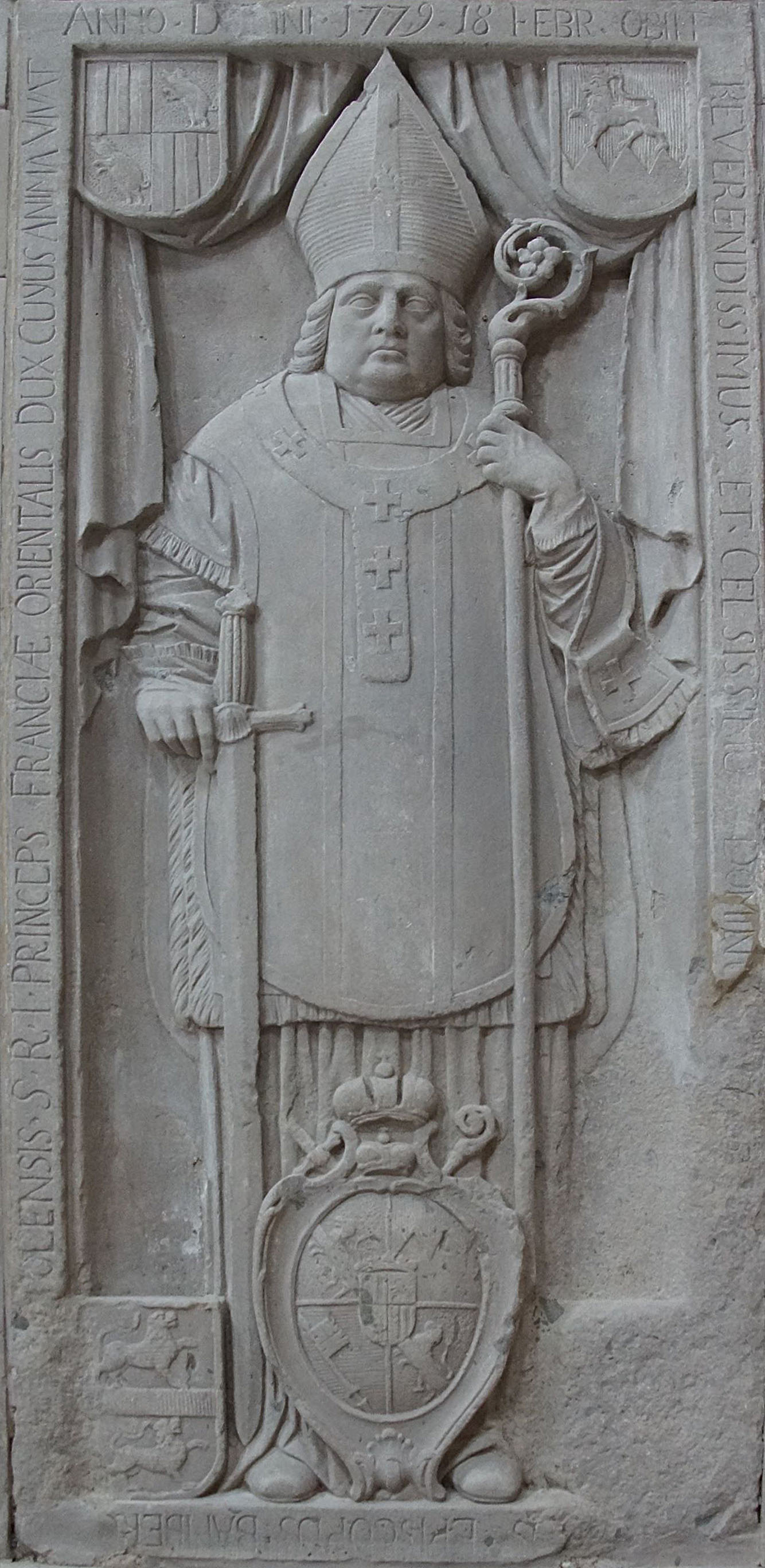
Adam Friedrich von Seinsheim
1755–1779

== Bibliography ==
- Max Hermann von Freeden: Die Festung Marienberg. Würzburg 1982.
- Flachenecker/Götschmann/Kummer (ed.): Burg. Schloss. Festung. Der Marienberg im Wandel. Mainfränkische Studien 78. Echter, Würzburg 2009. p. 168
- Festung Marienberg. Burgführer mit 41 Farbaufnahmen. Würzburg 2004.
