= Marquard Sebastian Schenk von Stauffenberg =

German Catholic bishop (1644–1693)

- Prince-Bishop of Bamberg
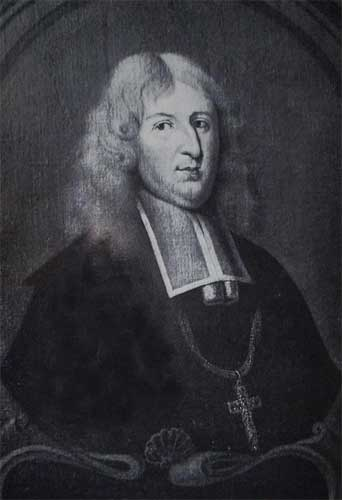
- Church: Catholic Church
- Diocese: Diocese of Bamberg
- In office: 12 August 1686 – 9 October 1693
- Predecessor: Peter Philipp von Dernbach
- Successor: Lothar Franz von Schönborn

Orders
- Ordination: April 1687
- Consecration: 6 April 1687 by Johann Gottfried von Guttenberg

Personal details
- Born: 14 May 1644 Eichstätt, Prince-Bishopric of Eichstätt, Franconian Circle, Holy Roman Empire
- Died: 9 October 1693 (aged 49)

Marquard Sebastian Schenk von Stauffenberg (14 May 1644 – 9 October 1693) was the Prince-Bishop of Bamberg from 1683 to 1693.

== Biography ==
Marquard Sebastian Schenk von Stauffenberg was born in Eichstätt on 14 May 1644.

He became a canon of Bamberg Cathedral, Würzburg Cathedral, and Augsburg Cathedral. On 10 June 1683 he was elected Prince-Bishop of Bamberg. Pope Innocent XI confirmed his appointment on 2 September 1686. He was ordained as a priest and consecrated as a bishop by Stephan Weinberger, auxiliary bishop of Augsburg, on 6 April 1687.

He received Schloss Greifenstein and rebuilt it in Baroque style, 1691–93, employing the Bavarian architect Leonhard Dientzenhofer. He also commissioned the building of Schloss Seehof.

He died on 9 October 1693.

Catholic Church titles
Preceded by Peter Philipp von Dernbach	Prince-Bishop of Bamberg; 1683–1693	Succeeded by Lothar Franz von Schönborn
