= Prince-Bishopric of Würzburg =

State of the Holy Roman Empire (1168–1803)

Coordinates: 49°47′N 9°56′E

Prince-Bishopric of Würzburg Fürstbistum Würzburg (German)
- 1168–1803
- Coat of arms

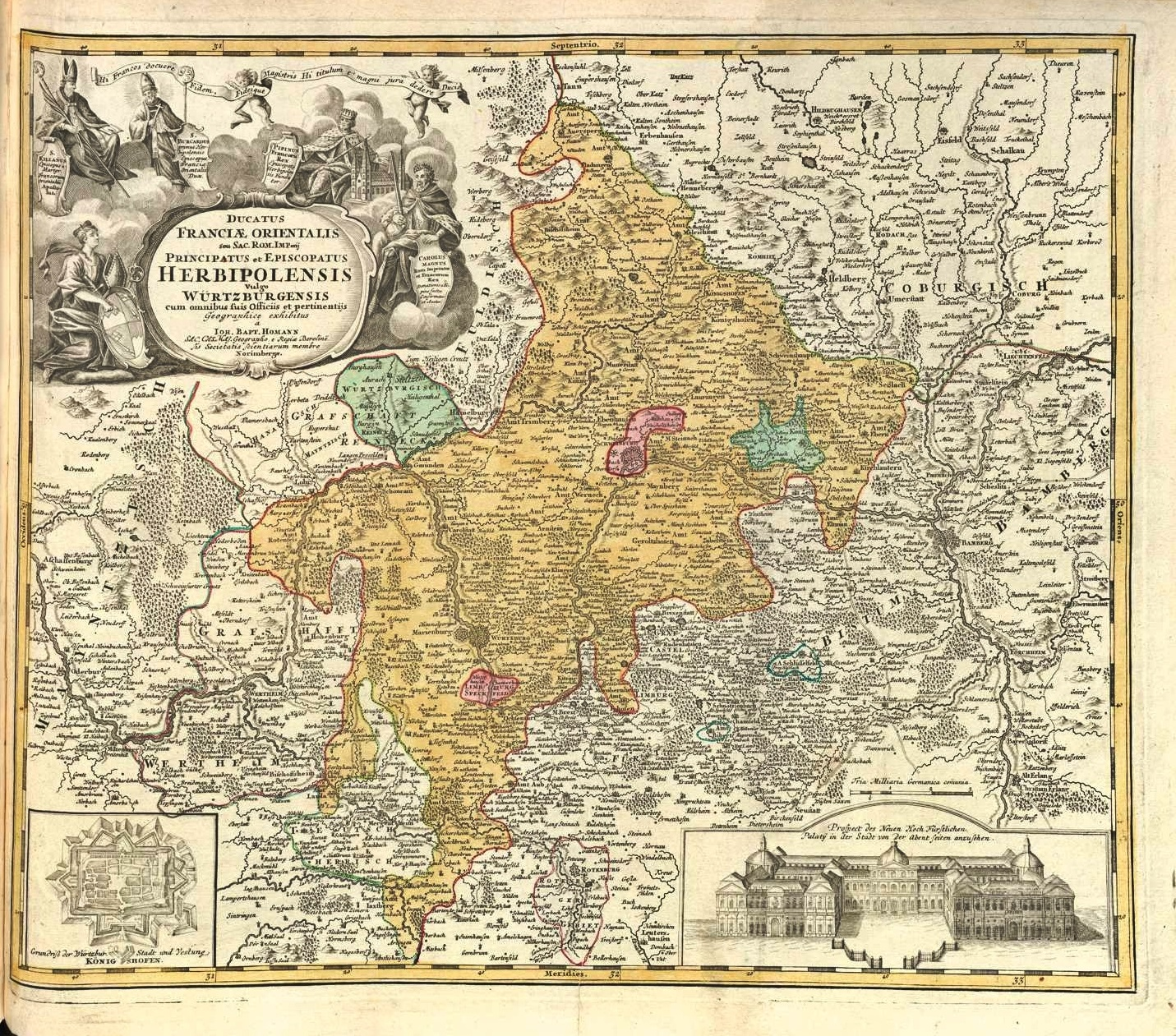
- The Prince-Bishopric of Würzburg in the 18th century
- Status: State of the Holy Roman Empire
- Capital: Würzburg
- Common languages: East Franconian German
- Religion: Roman Catholic
- Government: Prince-Bishopric
- Prince-Bishop
  - First bishop (743–55): St Burchard I
  - First Prince-Bishop (1165–70): Herold von Hochheim
  - Last (1795–1808; Prince-Bishop to 1803): Georg Karl von Fechenbach
- Historical era: Middle Ages
  - Bishopric founded: 743
  - Raised to prince-bishopric: 1168
  - Prince-Bishops styled Dukes in Franconia: 1441
  - Ecclesiastical Prince of Franconian Circle: 1500
  - Secularised and annexed by Bavaria: 25 February 1803
  - Ceded to Ferdinand and raised to Grand Duchy: 30 September 1806
Preceded by	Succeeded by
Duchy of Franconia	Grand Duchy of Würzburg

The Prince-Bishopric of Würzburg (German: Fürstbistum Würzburg; Hochstift Würzburg) was an ecclesiastical principality of the Holy Roman Empire located in Lower Franconia, west of the Prince-Bishopric of Bamberg. Würzburg had been a diocese since 743. As established by the Concordat of 1448, bishops in Germany were chosen by the canons of the cathedral chapter and their election was later confirmed by the pope. Following a common practice in Germany, the prince-bishops of Würzburg were frequently elected to other ecclesiastical principalities as well. (Note: For instance, Johann Franz Schönborn was first elected prince-bishop of Würzburg in 1642, then elector of Mainz in 1647, and finally prince-bishop of Worms in 1663.) The last few prince-bishops resided at the Würzburg Residence, which is one of the grandest Baroque palaces in Europe.

As a consequence of the 1801 Treaty of Lunéville, Würzburg, along with the other ecclesiastical states of Germany, was secularized in 1803 and absorbed into the Electorate of Bavaria. In the same year Ferdinand III, former Grand Duke of Tuscany, was compensated with the Electorate of Salzburg. In the 1805 Peace of Pressburg, Ferdinand lost Salzburg to the Austrian Empire, but was compensated with the new Grand Duchy of Würzburg, Bavaria having relinquished the territory in return for the Tyrol. This new state lasted until 1814, when it was once again annexed by Bavaria (then Kingdom of Bavaria).

The Roman Catholic Diocese of Würzburg remained as an ecclesiastical institution and was "reformed" in 1818 after the Concordat of 24 October 1817 with Bavaria as part of new ecclesiastical province of the Archdiocese of Bamberg but anyway without temporal power.

== Duke of Franconia ==
In 1115, Henry V awarded the territory of Eastern Franconia (Ostfranken) to his nephew Conrad of Hohenstaufen, who used the title "Duke of Franconia". Franconia remained a Hohenstaufen power base until 1168, when the Bishop of Würzburg was formally ceded the ducal rights in Eastern Franconia. The name "Franconia" fell out of usage, but the bishop revived it in his own favour in 1442 and held it until the reforms of Napoleon Bonaparte abolished it.

== Coat of arms ==
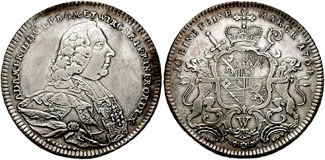
Silver coin showing the effigy and coat of arms of Prince-Bishop Adam Friedrich von Seinsheim (1764)

The charge of the original coat of arms showed the "Rennfähnlein" banner, quarterly argent and gules, on a lance or, in bend, on a blue shield. In the 14th century another coat of arms was created, the "Rechen" or rake. The coat of arms represents the holism of heaven and earth. The three white pikes represent the Trinity of God and the four red pikes, directed to earth, stand for the four points of the compass, representing the whole spread of earth. The red colour represents the blood of Christ.

The prince-bishops used both within their personal coat of arms. The Rechen and the Rennfähnlein represented the diocese, while the other (usually two) fields showed the personal coat of arms of the bishop's family. The coat of arms showed the Rechen in the first and third field, the Rennfähnlein in the second and fourth field.

== Prince-Bishops of Würzburg, 1168–1803 ==
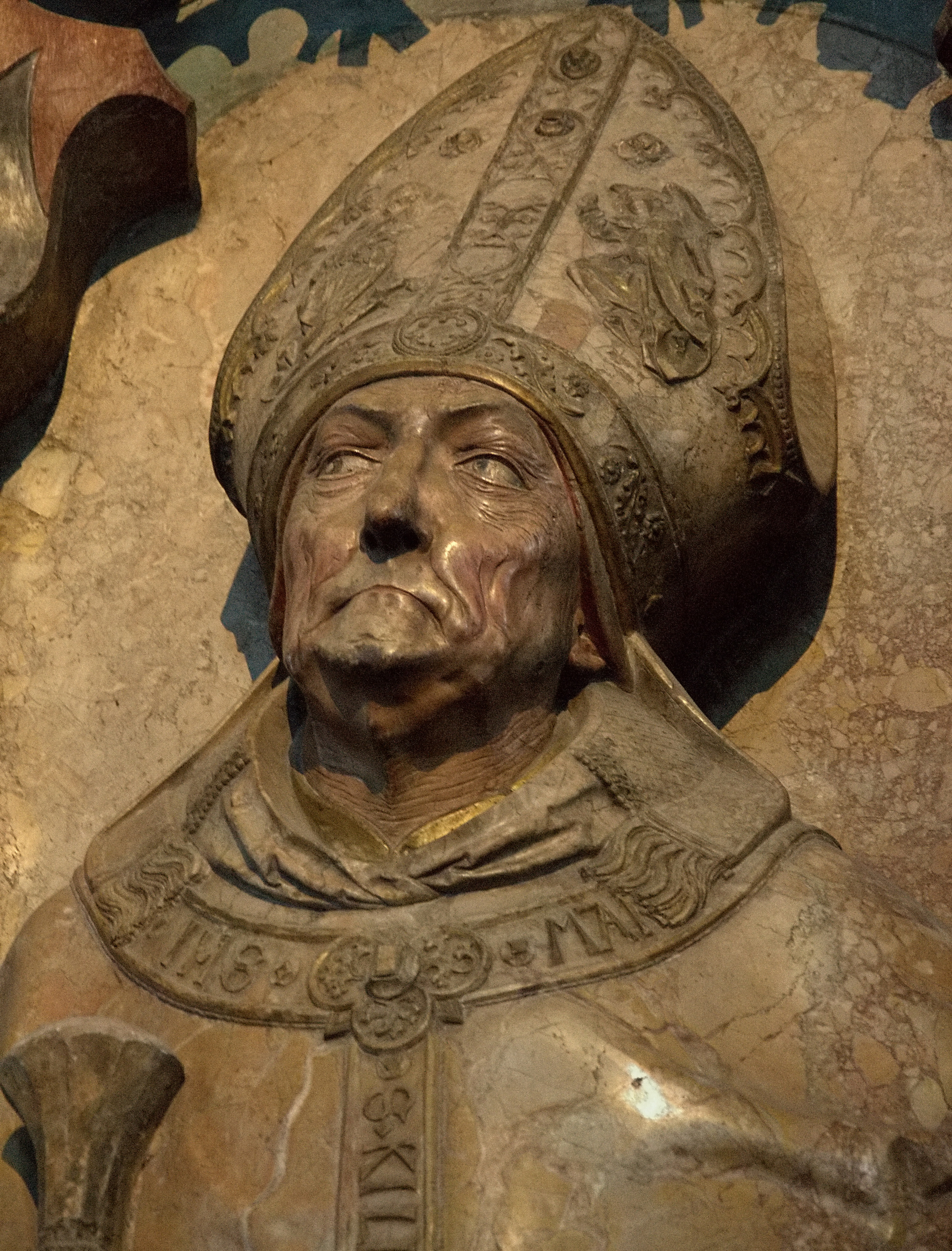
Prince-Bishop Rudolf von Scherenberg

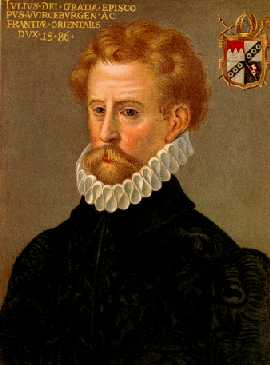
Prince-Bishop Julius Echter von Mespelbrunn

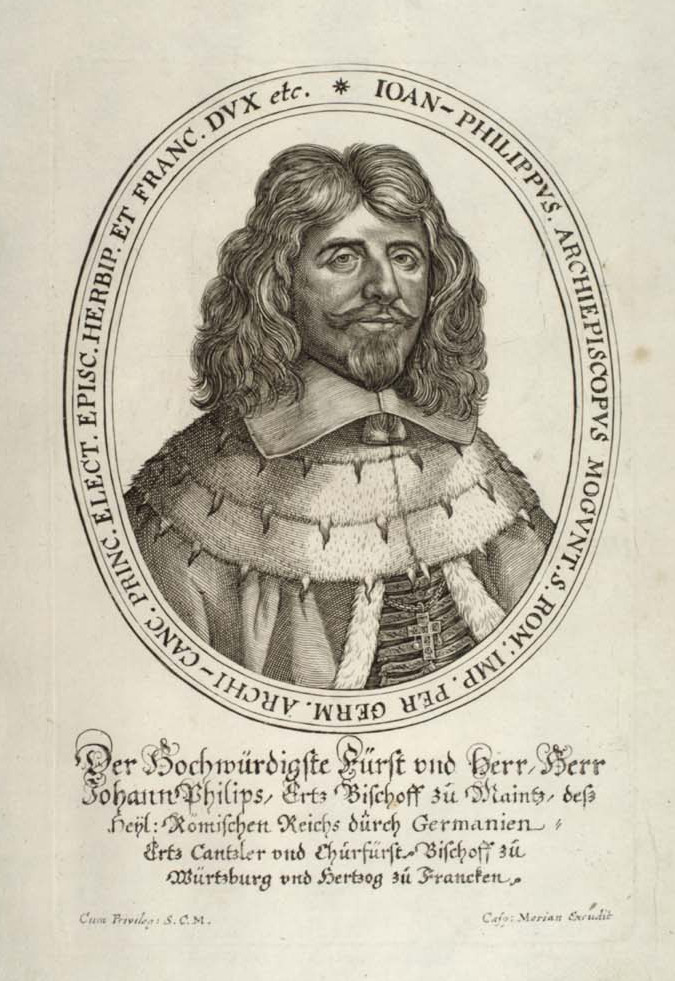
Prince-Bishop Johann Philipp von Schönborn

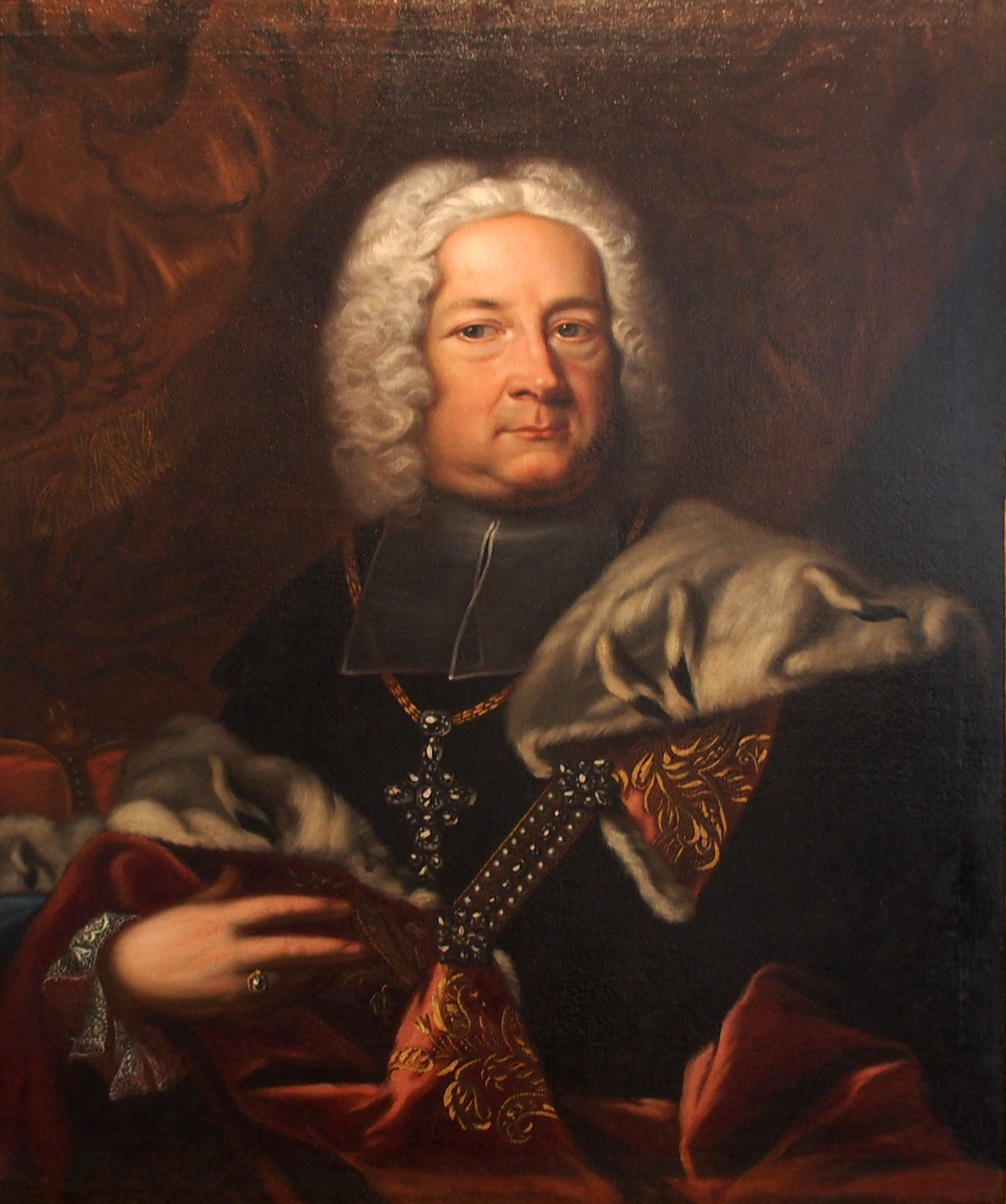
Friedrich Karl von Schönborn (1674-1746), Bishop of Bamberg and Würzburg (1729–1746), Vice Chancellor of the Holy Roman Empire

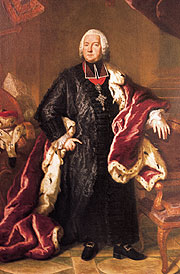
Prince-Bishop Adam Friedrich von Seinsheim

- Herold von Hochheim 1165–1170
- Reginhard von Abenberg 1171–1186
- Gottfried I von Spitzenberg-Helfenstein 1186–1190
- Philip of Swabia 1190–1191
- Heinrich III of Berg 1191–1197
- Gottfried II von Hohenlohe 1197
- Konrad von Querfurt 1198–1202
- Saint George and the Dragon-1465-1535
- Otto I. von Lobdeburg 1207–1223
- Dietrich von Homburg 1223–1225
- Hermann I von Lobdeburg 1225–1254
- Iring von Reinstein-Homburg 1254–1266
- Heinrich V von Leiningen 1254–1255
- Poppo III von Trimberg 1267–1271
- Berthold I von Henneberg 1271–1274
- Berthold II von Sternberg 1274–1287
- Mangold von Neuenburg 1287–1303 (Bishop of Bamberg 1285)
- Andreas von Gundelfingen 1303–1313
- Gottfried III von Hohenlohe 1313–1322
- Friedrich von Stolberg 1313–1317
- Wolfram Wolfskeel von Grumbach 1322–1332
- Hermann II Hummel von Lichtenberg 1333–1335
- Otto II von Wolfskeel 1335–1345
- Albrecht I von Hohenberg 1345–1349
- Albrecht II von Hohenlohe 1350–1372
- Gerhard von Schwarzburg 1372–1400
- Albrecht III von Katzburg 1372–1376
- Johann I von Egloffstein 1400–1411
- Johann II von Brunn 1411–1440
- Sigmund of Saxony 1440–1443
- Gottfried I von Limpurg 1443–1455
- Johann III von Grumbach 1455–1466
- Rudolf II von Scherenberg 1466–1495
- Lorenz von Bibra 1495–1519
- Konrad von Thüngen 1519–1540
- Conrad von Bibra 1540–1544
- Melchior Zobel von Giebelstadt 1544–1558
- Friedrich von Wirsberg 1558–1573
- Julius Echter von Mespelbrunn 1573–1617
- Johann Gottfried von Aschhausen 1617–1622 (Bishop of Bamberg 1609–1622)
- Philipp Adolf von Ehrenberg 1622–1631
- Franz von Hatzfeld 1631–1642 (Bishop of Bamberg 1633–1642)
- Johann Philipp von Schönborn 1642–1673
- Johann Hartmann von Rosenbach 1673–1675
- Peter Philipp von Dernbach 1675–1683
- Konrad Wilhelm von Wernau 1683–1684
- Johann Gottfried II von Gutenberg 1684–1698
- Johann Philipp von Greifenclau zu Vollraths 1699–1719
- Johann Philipp Franz von Schönborn 1719–1725
- Christoph Franz von Hutten 1724–1729
- Friedrich Karl von Schönborn 1729–1746 (also Bishop of Bamberg)
- Anselm Franz von Ingelheim 1746–1749
- Karl Philipp von Greifenclau zu Vollraths 1749–1754
- Adam Friedrich von Seinsheim 1755–1779 (Bishop of Bamberg 1757–1779)
- Franz Ludwig von Erthal 1779–1795 (also Bishop of Bamberg)
- Georg Karl Ignaz von Fechenbach zu Laudenbach 1795–1808

Secular power lost in 1803. Territory ceded to Bavaria until 1805.

== See also ==
- Würzburg Cathedral – for burial locations of most Würzburg bishops
- Ebrach Abbey – beginning with the 13th century, the bishops of Würzburg had their hearts brought to Ebrach Abbey (entrails to the Marienkirche, bodies to Würzburg cathedral). About 30 hearts of bishops, some of which had been desecrated during the German Peasants' War, are said to have found their final resting place at Ebrach. Prince-Bishop Julius Echter von Mespelbrunn broke with this tradition and had his heart buried in the Neubaukirche at Würzburg.

== Gallery ==
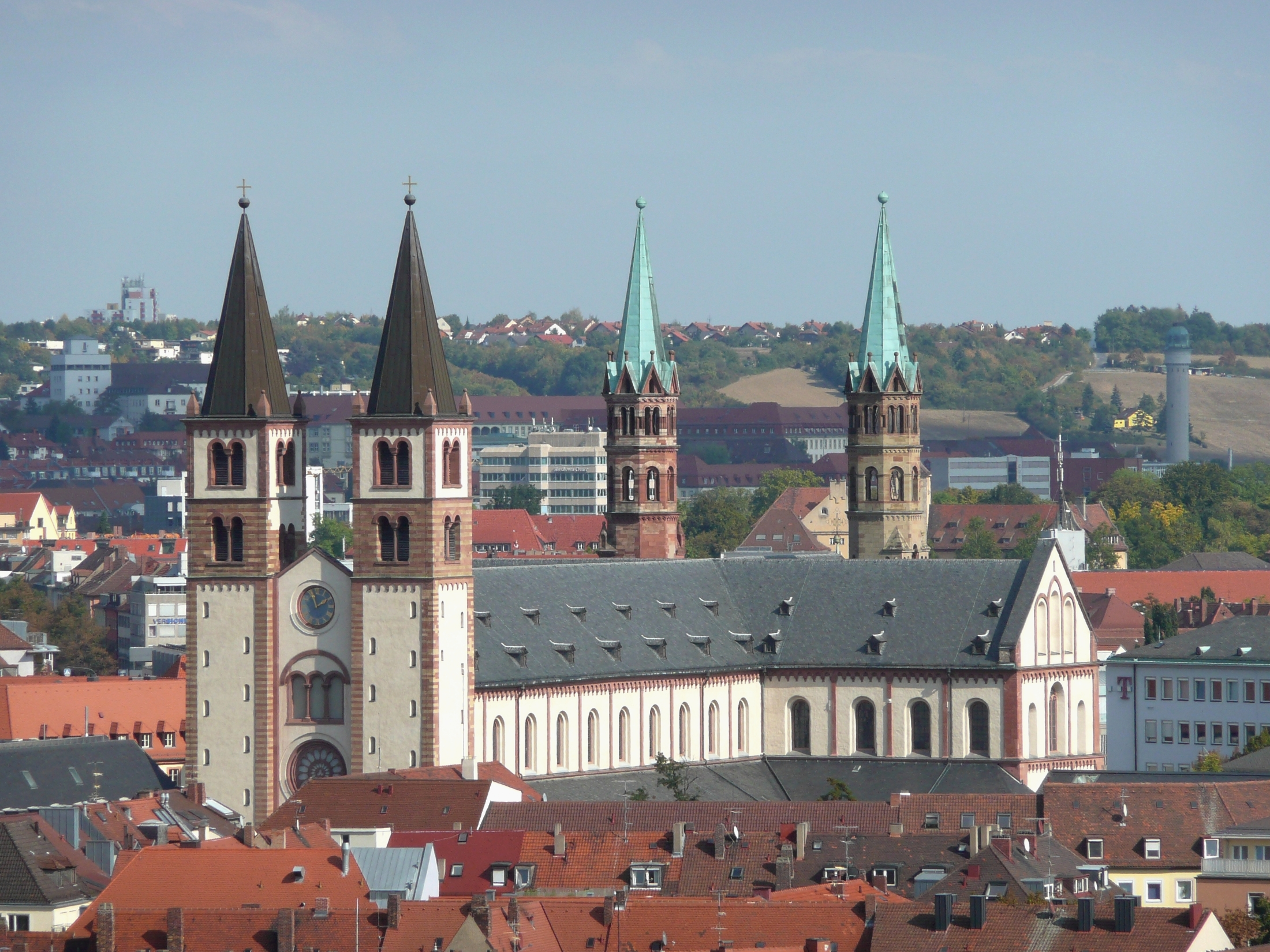
Würzburg Cathedral

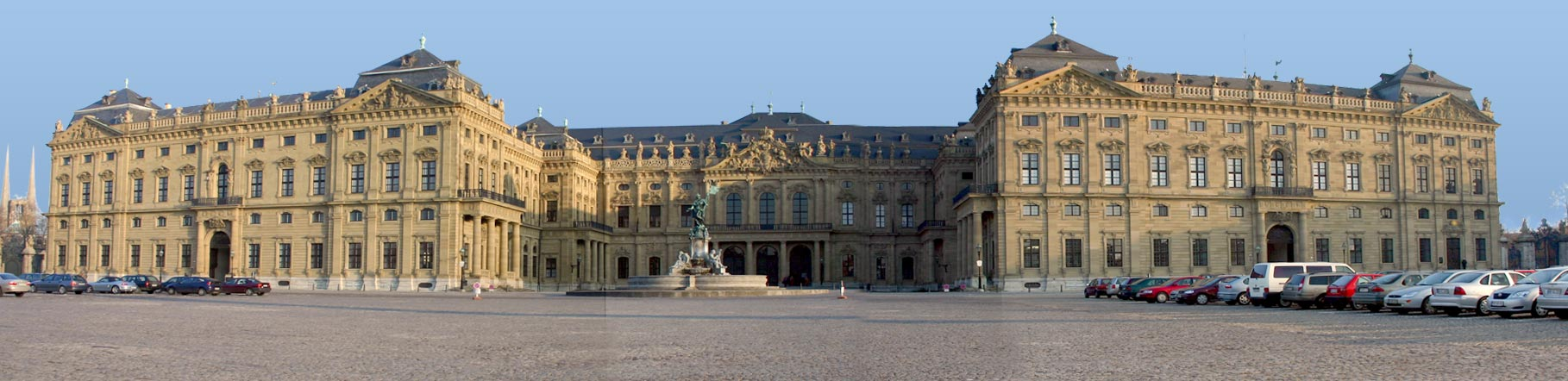
Würzburg Residence, built 1719-1744 for Johann Philipp Franz von Schönborn and Friedrich Karl von Schönborn

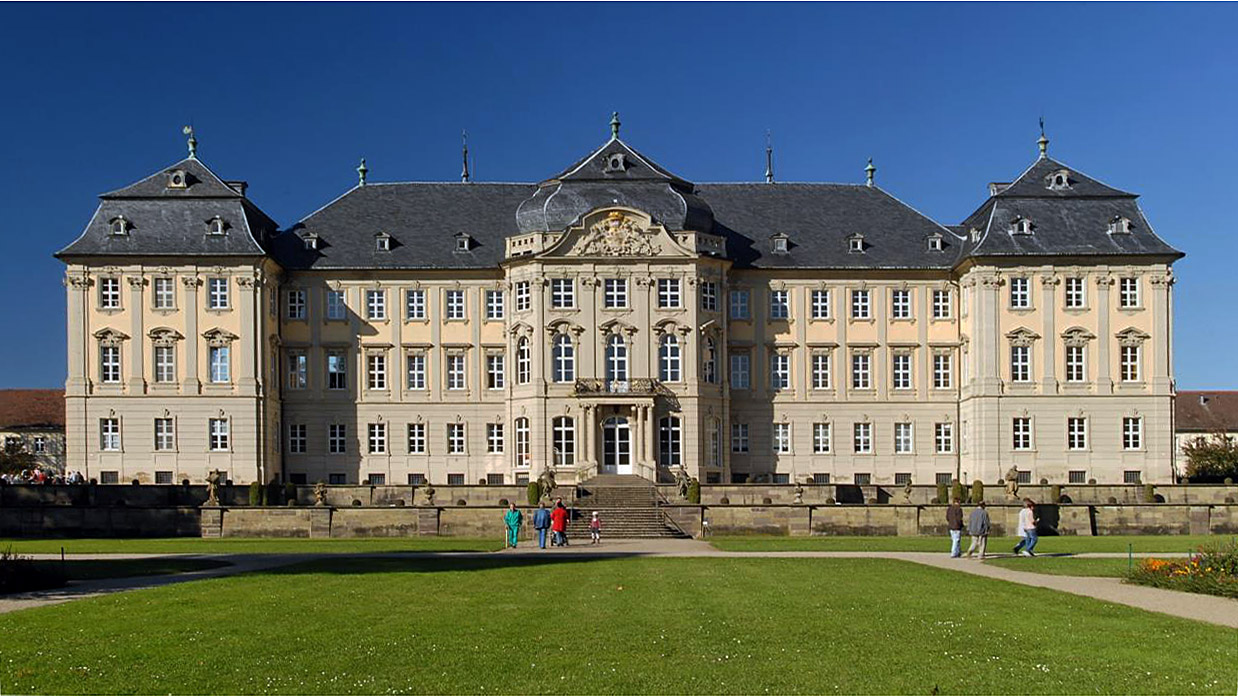
Schloss Werneck, built 1733-1745 for Friedrich Karl von Schönborn

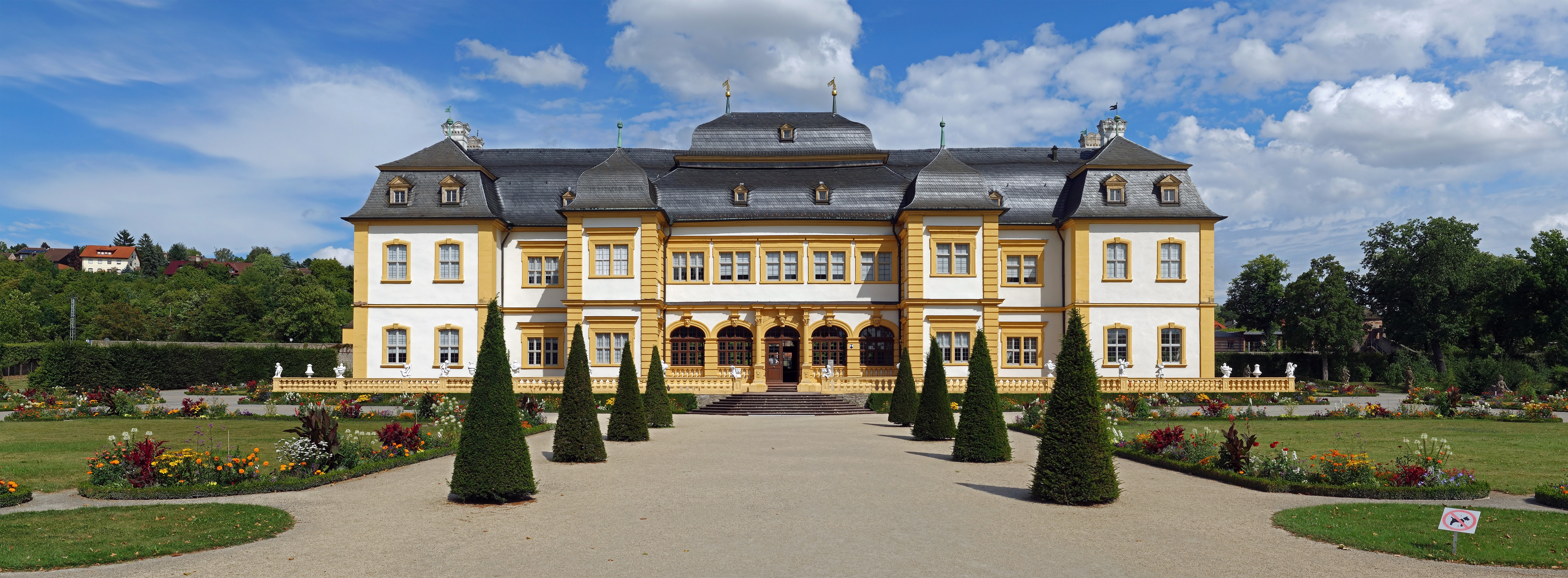
Veitshöchheim summer residence

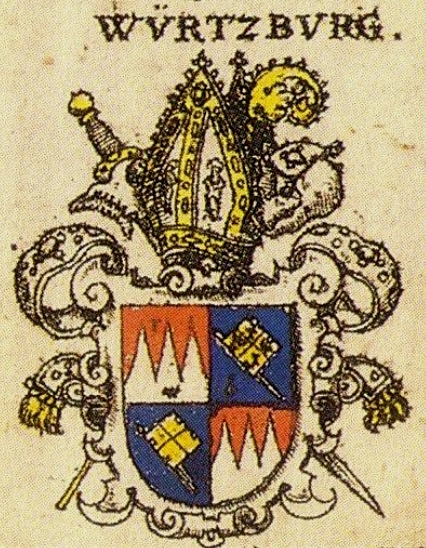
Coat of arms
