= Johann Hartmann von Rosenbach =

Prince-Bishop of Würzburg from 1673 to 1675

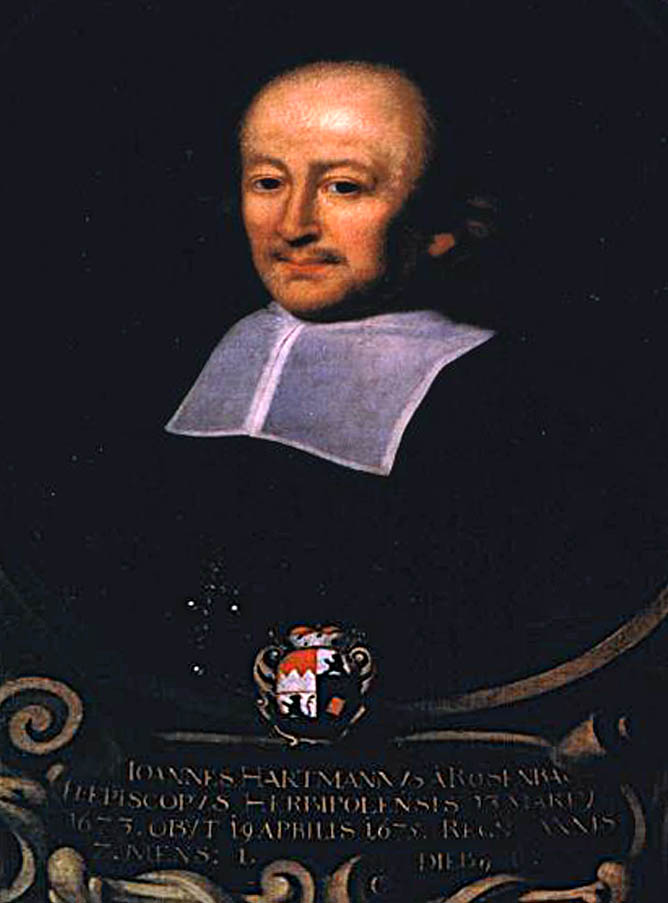
Johann Hartmann von Rosenbach

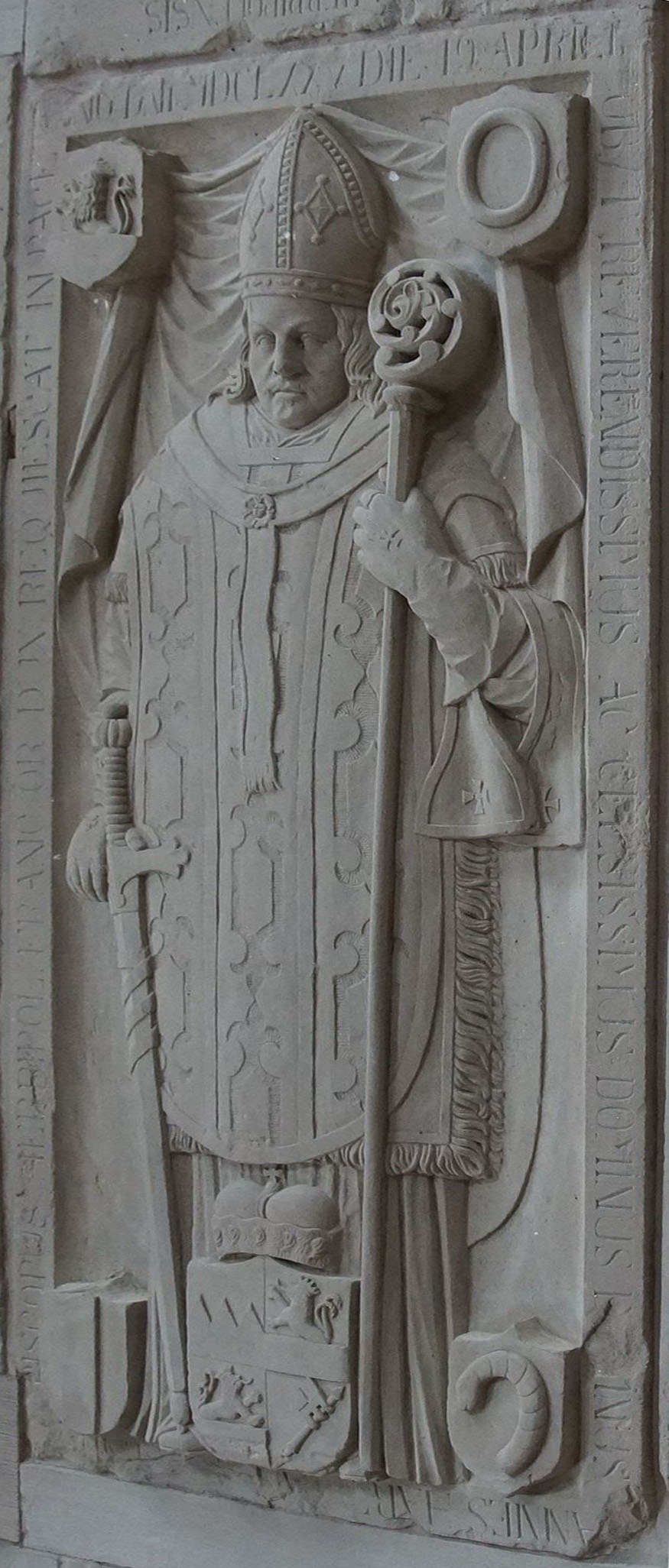
Relief for Johann Hartmann von Rosenbach entrails at the Marienkirche, Würzburg

Johann Hartmann von Rosenbach (September 15, 1609 – April 19, 1675) was the Prince-Bishop of Würzburg from 1673 to 1675.

Johann Hartmann von Rosenbach was born in Stammheim, Florstadt on 15 September 1609 to Johann Dietrich von Rosenbach (major of Amoneburg and Friedburg) and his wife Susanna Regina von Knoringen, as the eldest of four children; his brother Heinrich became canon in Wurzburg and his brother Philipp headed the Fulda Monastery. Johann received minor orders in 1627 and became a judge in 1652.

The cathedral chapter of Würzburg Cathedral elected him Prince-Bishop of Würzburg on 13 March 1673, with Pope Clement X confirming his appointment on 10 September 1674. He was consecrated as a bishop by Stephan Weinberger, auxiliary bishop of Würzburg on 6 January 1675.

During his time as Prince-Bishop, the Franco-Dutch War spilled into the Prince-Bishopric of Würzburg, with forces under Henri de la Tour d'Auvergne, Vicomte de Turenne invading the bishopric. These forces were eventually beaten back by troops under the command of Raimondo Montecuccoli.

He died on 19 April 1675.

Catholic Church titles
Preceded by Johann Philipp von Schönborn	Prince-Bishop of Würzburg; 1673-1675	Succeeded by Peter Philipp von Dernbach
