= Johann Philipp Franz von Schönborn =

- Prince-Bishop of Würzburg
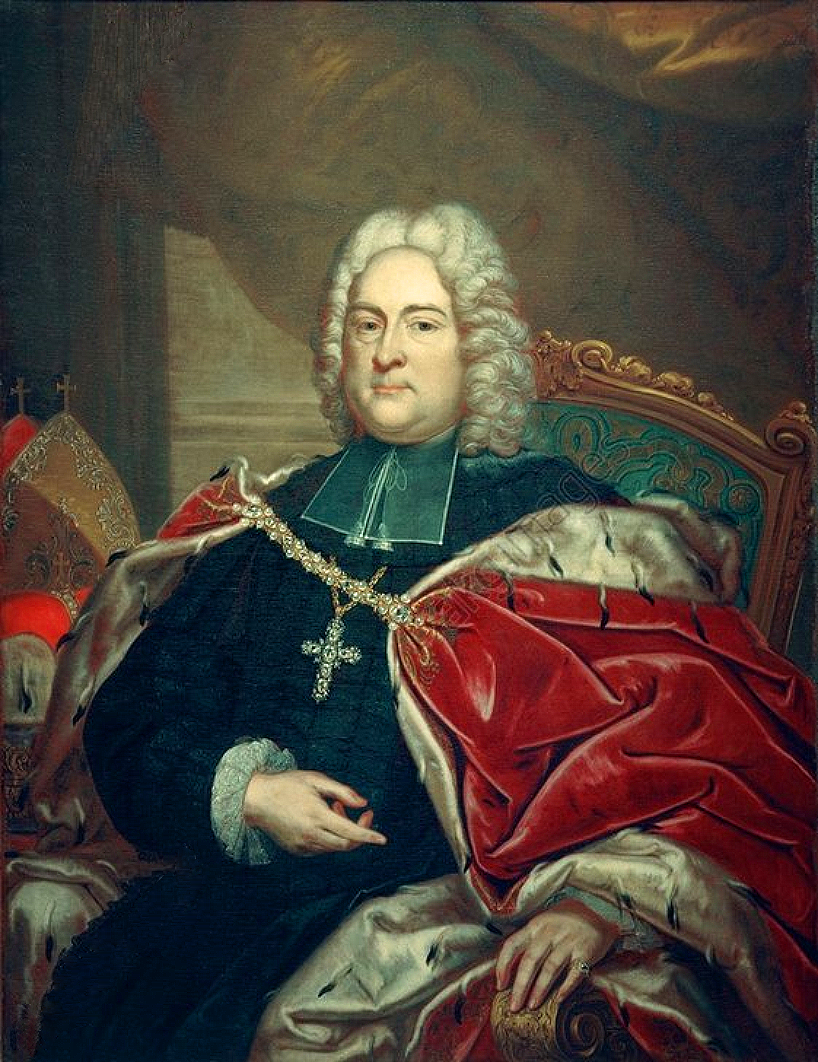
- Johann Philipp Franz von Schönborn by Frans van Stampart, c. 1713
- Church: Catholic Church
- Diocese: Diocese of Würzburg
- In office: 15 December 1719 – 18 August 1724
- Predecessor: Johann Philipp von Greifenclau zu Vollraths
- Successor: Christoph Franz von Hutten

Orders
- Ordination: 25 July 1720
- Consecration: 10 November 1720 by Lothar Franz von Schönborn

Personal details
- Born: 15 February 1673 Würzburg, Prince-Bishopric of Würzburg, Franconian Circle, Holy Roman Empire
- Died: 18 August 1724 (aged 51) Löffelstelzen (northeast of Bad Mergentheim), Prince-Bishopric of Würzburg, Franconian Circle, Holy Roman Empire

Johann Philipp Franz von Schönborn (15 February 1673 – 18 August 1724) was the Prince-Bishop of Würzburg from 1719 to 1724. His principal claim to fame is his commissioning of the Würzburg Residence, a major work of Baroque architecture.

== Life ==
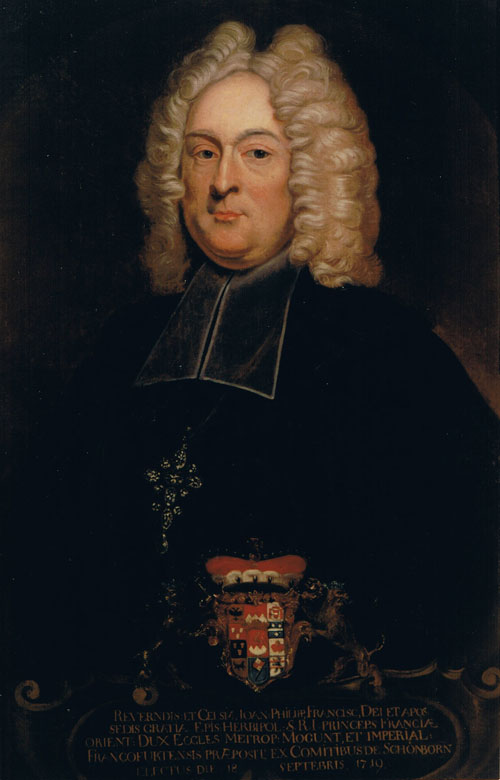
Portrait of Johann Philipp Franz von Schönborn

Johann Philipp Franz von Schönborn was born in Würzburg on 15 February 1673, the oldest son of Melchior Friedrich, Count of Schönborn-Buchheim (1644-1717, see List of rulers of Schönborn) and his wife, Maria Anna Sophia (or Sophie) von Boineburg (1652–1726). His uncle was Lothar Franz von Schönborn, Archbishop-Elector of Mainz from 1694 to 1729.

As the oldest son, Johann Philipp Franz was slated for an ecclesiastical career from an early age. He was educated at the Jesuit school at Aschaffenburg, starting in 1681. He became a Domizellar canon of Würzburg Cathedral in 1682. He then studied, alongside his younger brother Friedrich Karl at the University of Würzburg, the University of Mainz, and in Rome (Collegium Germanicum), completing his studies in 1693. He was admitted to the cathedral chapter of Mainz in 1687, Bamberg in 1694 and Würzburg Cathedral in 1699. He was also named Probst of Frankfurt Cathedral in 1699. By the time he became Dompropst at Würzburg (1704) and Mainz (1714), he had already served his uncle in several diplomatic missions and had been his local representative at Erfurt.

He was elected unanimously as Prince-Bishop of Würzburg on 18 September 1719. He was an active but unconventional prince. He issued a wave of decrees and left a particular imprint on the town of Würzburg. Afraid of war, he continued construction of the new town defences and of a border fortress at Königshofen irrespective of the financial resources of the local population.

Artistically gifted, he recognized the talent of Balthasar Neumann whom he tasked with building a new residence in the town (1720). He also ordered construction of the Schönbornkapelle at Würzburg Cathedral. Both of these were only finished under the rule of his brother, Friedrich Karl. Johann Philipp Franz also issued a planning edict that organized construction in Würzburg (1722). He also supported the University of Würzburg, e.g. by endowing a chair in history (1720), and brought Johann Georg von Eckhart to Würzburg as court librarian. However, his at times erratic style of governing and his gruff personal manners antagonized some of his people, including the cathedral chapter. When he had a heart attack in 1724, dying at Löffelstelzen near Bad Mergentheim on 18 August 1724, some in his family assumed he had been poisoned. When the cathedral chapter of Würzburg elected a new bishop in 1724, they rejected Friedrich Karl, due to the unpopularity of his late brother. Christoph Franz von Hutten was elected Bishop of Würzburg instead, and only upon the latter's death in 1729, Friedrich Karl succeeded him as Prince-Bishop of Bamberg.

Johann Philipp Franz is buried in the Schönbornkapelle of Würzburg Cathedral.

Catholic Church titles
Preceded by Johann Philipp von Greifenclau zu Vollraths	Prince-Bishop of Würzburg; 1719–1724	Succeeded by Christoph Franz von Hutten
