= Johann Philipp von Greifenclau zu Vollraths =

- Prince-Bishop of Würzburg
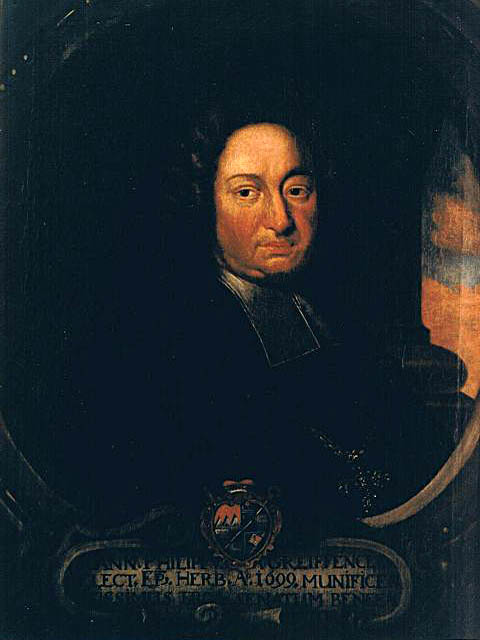
- Church: Catholic Church
- Diocese: Diocese of Würzburg
- In office: 1 June 1699 – 3 August 1719
- Predecessor: Johann Gottfried von Guttenberg
- Successor: Johann Philipp Franz von Schönborn

Orders
- Ordination: 13 April 1687
- Consecration: 5 July 1699 by Stephan Weinberger

Personal details
- Born: 13 February 1652 Amorbach, Prince-Bishopric of Würzburg, Franconian Circle, Holy Roman Empire
- Died: 3 August 1719 (aged 67) Würzburg, Prince-Bishopric of Würzburg, Franconian Circle, Holy Roman Empire

Johann Philipp von Greifenclau zu Vollraths (also spelled Greiffenklau and Vollrads; 13 February 1652 – 3 August 1719) was a German clergyman who served as Prince and Bishop of Würzburg from 1699 until his death in 1719.

Johann Philipp von Greifenclau zu Vollraths was born in Amorbach on 13 February 1652, the son of Georg Philipp Freiherr von Greiffenclau-Vollrads, Amtmann of the Archbishopric of Mainz, and his wife Rosina von Oberstein.

He became a canon (Domizellar) of Würzburg Cathedral in 1666. In 1676, he received the minor orders and then became a subdeacon. He became a member of the cathedral chapter of Würzburg Cathedral, at which point he became the cathedral's cantor. He was ordained as a priest on 13 April 1687. He became dean of Mainz Cathedral in 1695.

On 9 February 1699, the cathedral chapter of Würzburg Cathedral elected him to be the Prince-Bishop of Würzburg, with Pope Innocent XII confirming his appointment on 1 June 1699. He was subsequently consecrated as a bishop by Stephan Weinberger, auxiliary bishop of Würzburg, on 5 July 1699.

He died in Würzburg on 3 August 1719.

Catholic Church titles
Preceded by Johann Gottfried von Guttenberg	Prince-Bishop of Würzburg; 1699–1719	Succeeded by Johann Philipp Franz von Schönborn
