= Christoph Franz von Hutten =

- Prince-Bishop of Würzburg
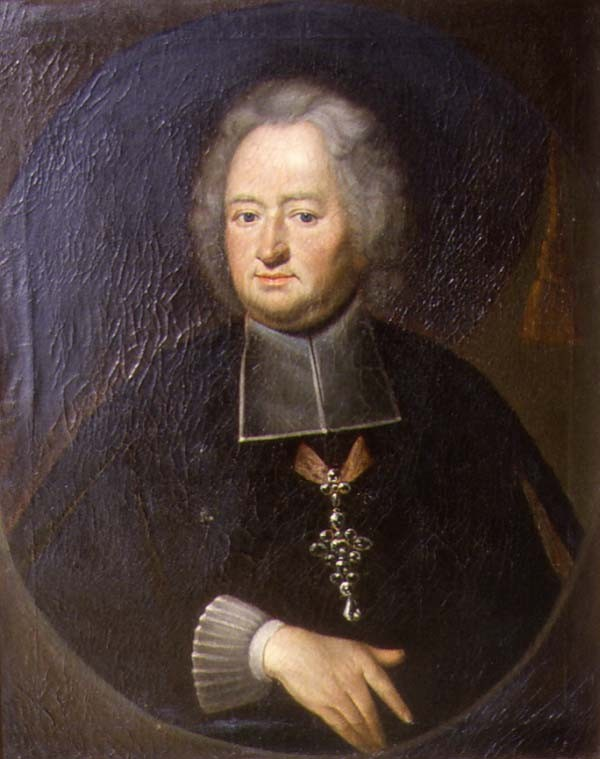
- Church: Catholic Church
- Diocese: Diocese of Würzburg
- In office: 20 December 1724 – 25 March 1729
- Predecessor: Johann Philipp Franz von Schönborn
- Successor: Friedrich Karl von Schönborn

Orders
- Ordination: 31 October 1717
- Consecration: 8 April 1725 by Johann Bernhard Mayer

Personal details
- Born: 19 January 1673 Mainberg (in present-day Schonungen), Prince-Bishopric of Würzburg, Franconian Circle, Holy Roman Empire
- Died: 25 March 1729 (aged 56)

Christoph Franz von Hutten (19 January 1673 – 25 March 1729) was the Prince-Bishop of Würzburg from 1724 to 1729.

== Life ==
Von Hutten was born in Mainberg in Lower Franconia on 19 January 1673. He was the son of Ritter Johann von Hutten (1629–90) and his wife Anna Maria, née Freiin von Hagen zu Motten und Buschfeld (1649–98).

He was educated at the University of Würzburg from 1680 to 1685. In 1686, he became a canon (Domizellar) of Würzburg Cathedral and of Comburg. He then studied at the Collegium Germanicum in Rome. He spent 1690–91 at the University of Siena. He then studied at the University of Mainz.

He was made a canon of Bamberg Cathedral on 2 March 1711. He became dean of Würzburg Cathedral on 12 November 1716. On 31 October 1717 he was ordained as a priest.

The cathedral chapter of Würzburg Cathedral elected him Prince-Bishop of Würzburg on 2 October 1724; Pope Benedict XIII confirmed his appointment on 28 December 1724. Johann Bernhard Mayer, auxiliary bishop of Würzburg, consecrated him as a bishop on 8 April 1725.

He died of pneumonia on 25 March 1729 and was buried in Würzburg Cathedral on 26 April 1729.

Catholic Church titles
Preceded by Johann Philipp Franz von Schönborn	Prince-Bishop of Würzburg; 1724–1729	Succeeded by Friedrich Karl von Schönborn
