= Peter Philipp von Dernbach =

- Prince-Bishop of Bamberg
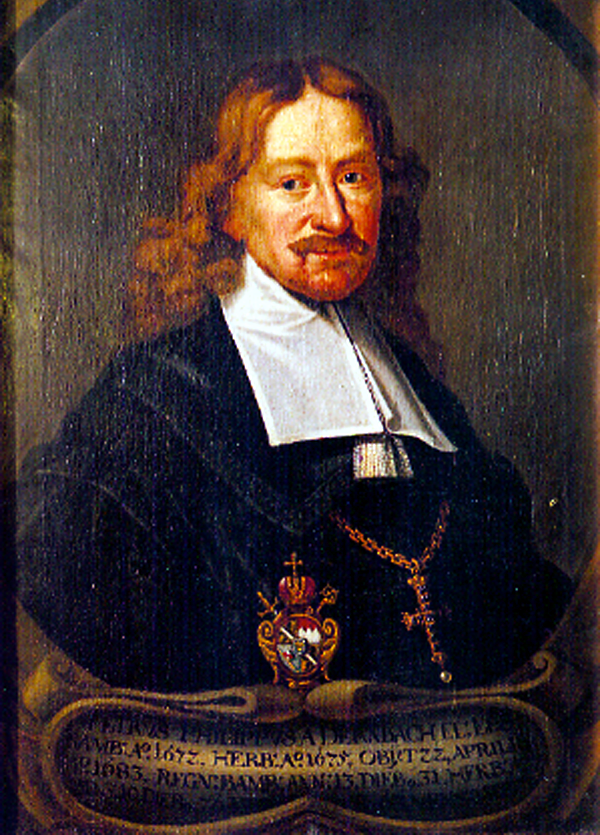
- Peter Philipp von Dernbach, gennant Graul, Prince-Bishop of Bamberg and Würzburg, Duke of Franconia
- Church: Catholic Church
- Diocese: Diocese of Bamberg
- In office: 28 January 1675 – 24 April 1683
- Predecessor: Philipp Valentin Albrecht Voit von Rieneck
- Successor: Marquard Sebastian Schenk von Stauffenberg
- Other post: Bishop of Würzburg (1676-1683)

Orders
- Ordination: 19 May 1675
- Consecration: 2 June 1675 by Stephan Weinberger

Personal details
- Born: 1 July 1619 Geisa, Princely Abbey of Fulda, Upper Rhenish Circle, Holy Roman Empire
- Died: 24 April 1683 (aged 63)

Peter Philipp von Dernbach (1 July 1619 – 24 April 1683) was the Prince-Bishop of Bamberg from 1672 to 1683 and Prince-Bishop of Würzburg from 1675 to 1683.

Peter Philipp von Dernbach was born in Geisa on 1 July 1619. His father was a Lutheran who later converted to Roman Catholicism.

He became a canon of Bamberg Cathedral on 7 February 1631, and a canon of Würzburg Cathedral on 25 February 1643. He spent 1642-43 studying at the University of Bamberg, and then moved on to study at the Collegium Germanicum in Rome. On 31 May 1649, he was made a prebendary of Bamberg Cathedral; he became a prebendary of Würzburg Cathedral on 7 August 1649. On 27 June 1651, he succeeded Philipp Valentin Albrecht Voit von Rieneck as provost of Bamberg Cathedral.

He was appointed Bishop of Bamberg on 22 March 1672, with Pope Clement X confirming his appointment on 28 January 1675. He was ordained as a priest on 19 May 1675. He was consecrated as a bishop by Damian Hartard von der Leyen-Hohengeroldseck, Archbishop of Mainz, on 2 June 1675. He was appointed Bishop of Würzburg in July 1675, with the pope confirming this appointment on 24 February 1676. This created a personal union between the Prince-Bishopric of Bamberg and the Prince-Bishopric of Würzburg.

He died of a stroke on 24 April 1683.

Catholic Church titles
Preceded by Philipp Valentin Albrecht Voit von Rieneck	Prince-Bishop of Bamberg; 1672–1683	Succeeded by Marquard Sebastian von Schenk von Stauffenberg
Preceded by Johann Hartmann von Rosenbach	Prince-Bishop of Würzburg; 1675–1683	Succeeded by Konrad Wilhelm von Wernau
