= Konrad Wilhelm von Wernau =

German clergyman

Konrad Wilhelm von Werdenau
- Prince-Bishop-elect of Würzburg
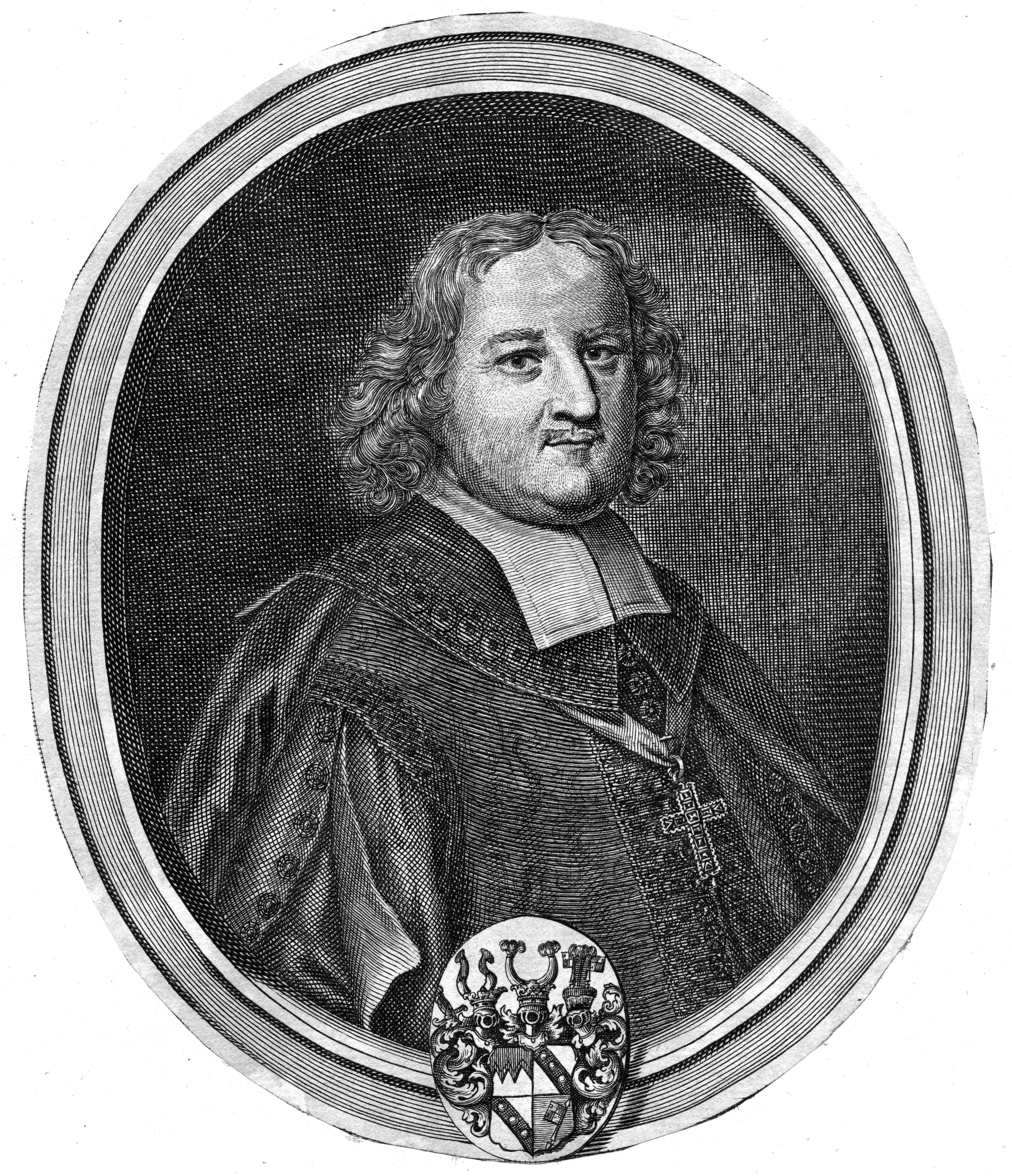
- Engraving of Konrad Wilhelm von Wernau by Johann Salver
- Church: Catholic Church
- Diocese: Diocese of Würzburg
- In office: 31 May 1683 – 5 September 1684
- Predecessor: Peter Philipp von Dernbach
- Successor: Johann Gottfried von Guttenberg

Orders
- Ordination: 21 December 1689

Personal details
- Born: 6 August 1638 Dettingen (in present-day Horb am Neckar), Further Austria, Habsburg Empire
- Died: 5 September 1684 (aged 46)

Konrad Wilhelm von Wernau (6 or 7 August 1638 – 5 September 1684) was a German clergyman who served as Prince and Bishop of Würzburg from his election on 31 May 1683 until his death in 1684.

Konrad Wilhelm von Wernau was born in Dettingen (part of modern Karlstein am Main) on 6 or 7 August 1638.

He was ordained as a priest on 21 December 1682. The cathedral chapter of Würzburg Cathedral elected him Prince-Bishop of Würzburg on 31 May 1683.

He died on 5 September 1684, without having had his election confirmed by the pope and without having been consecrated as a bishop.

Catholic Church titles
Preceded by Peter Philipp von Dernbach	Prince-Bishop of Würzburg; 1683–1684	Succeeded by Johann Gottfried von Guttenberg
