= Johann Gottfried von Guttenberg =

Roman Catholic bishop

- Prince-Bishop of Würzburg
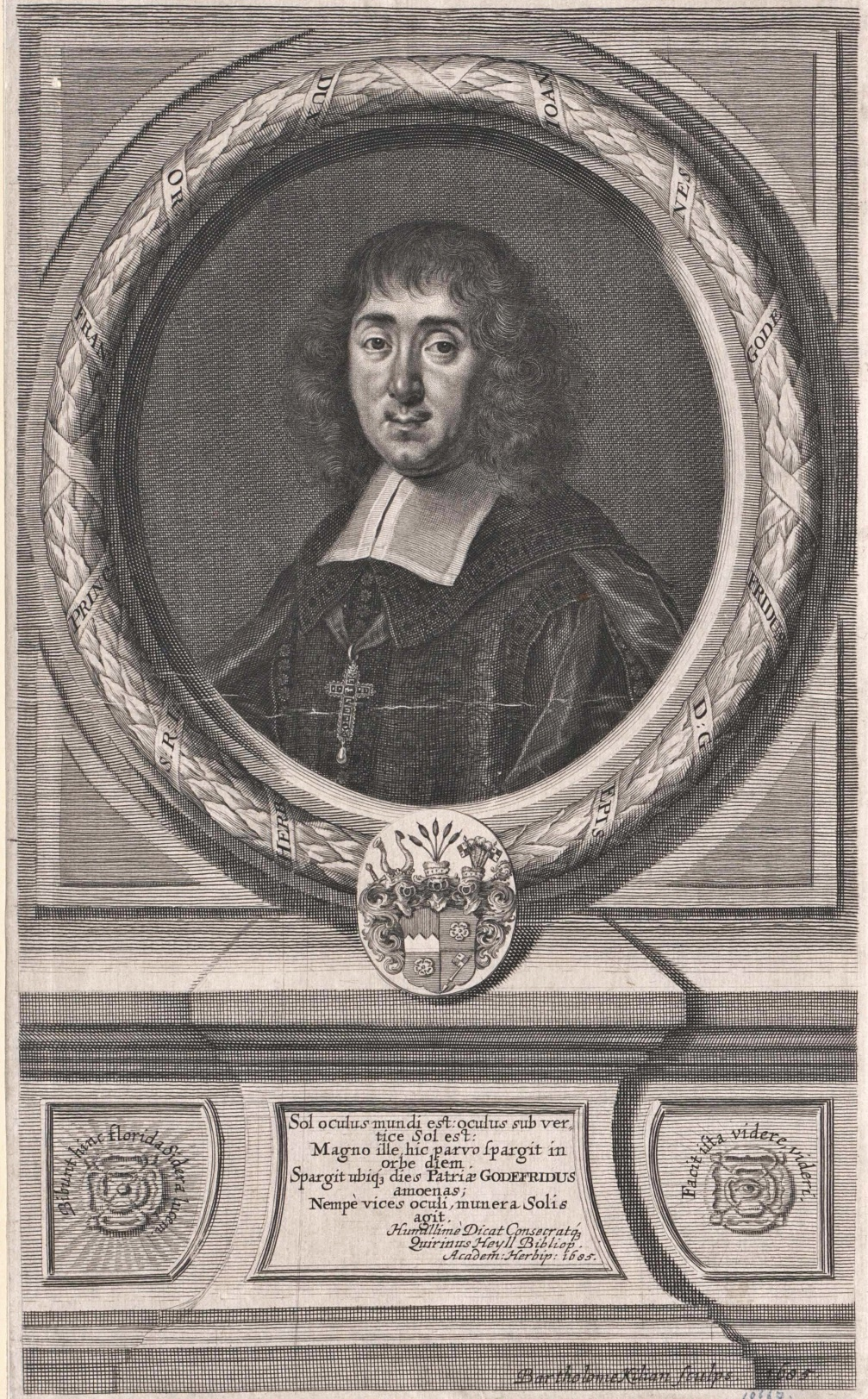
- Church: Catholic Church
- Diocese: Diocese of Würzburg
- In office: 12 August 1686 – 14 December 1698
- Predecessor: Konrad Wilhelm von Wernau
- Successor: Johann Philipp von Greifenclau zu Vollraths

Orders
- Ordination: 22 December 1686 by Stephan Weinberger
- Consecration: 29 December 1686 by Stephan Weinberger

Personal details
- Born: 6 November 1645 Marloffstein, Prince-Bishopric of Bamberg, Franconian Circle, Holy Roman Empire
- Died: 14 December 1698 (aged 53) Würzburg, Prince-Bishopric of Würzburg, Franconian Circle, Holy Roman Empire

Johann Gottfried von Guttenberg (6 November 1645 – 14 December 1698) was a German clergyman who served as Prince and Bishop of Würzburg from 1684, until his death in 1698.

== Biography ==
The House of Guttenberg was a prominent Franconian noble family, belonging to an old German nobility, named after Guttenberg Castle.

Johann Gottfried was born at Marloffstein Castle, as the son of Gottfried Wilhelm von und zu Guttenberg zu Steinenhausen und Leuzenhof (1623–1683) and his wife and cousin, Maria Kunigunda Ursula von und zu Guttenberg zu Kirchlauter (1623–1681).

In the Nine Years' War, the Prince-Bishop allied with the Leopold I, Holy Roman Emperor and provided him with troops.

During his life, he built schloss Kirchlauter (Bavaria) on his private property, which he inherited from his mother.

== Death ==
He died in Würzburg, aged 53.

Catholic Church titles
Preceded by Konrad Wilhelm von Wernau	Prince-Bishop of Würzburg; 1684–1698	Succeeded by Johann Philipp von Greifenclau zu Vollraths
