= Würzburg Cathedral =

- The Cathedral of Saint Kilian
- Würzburger Dom
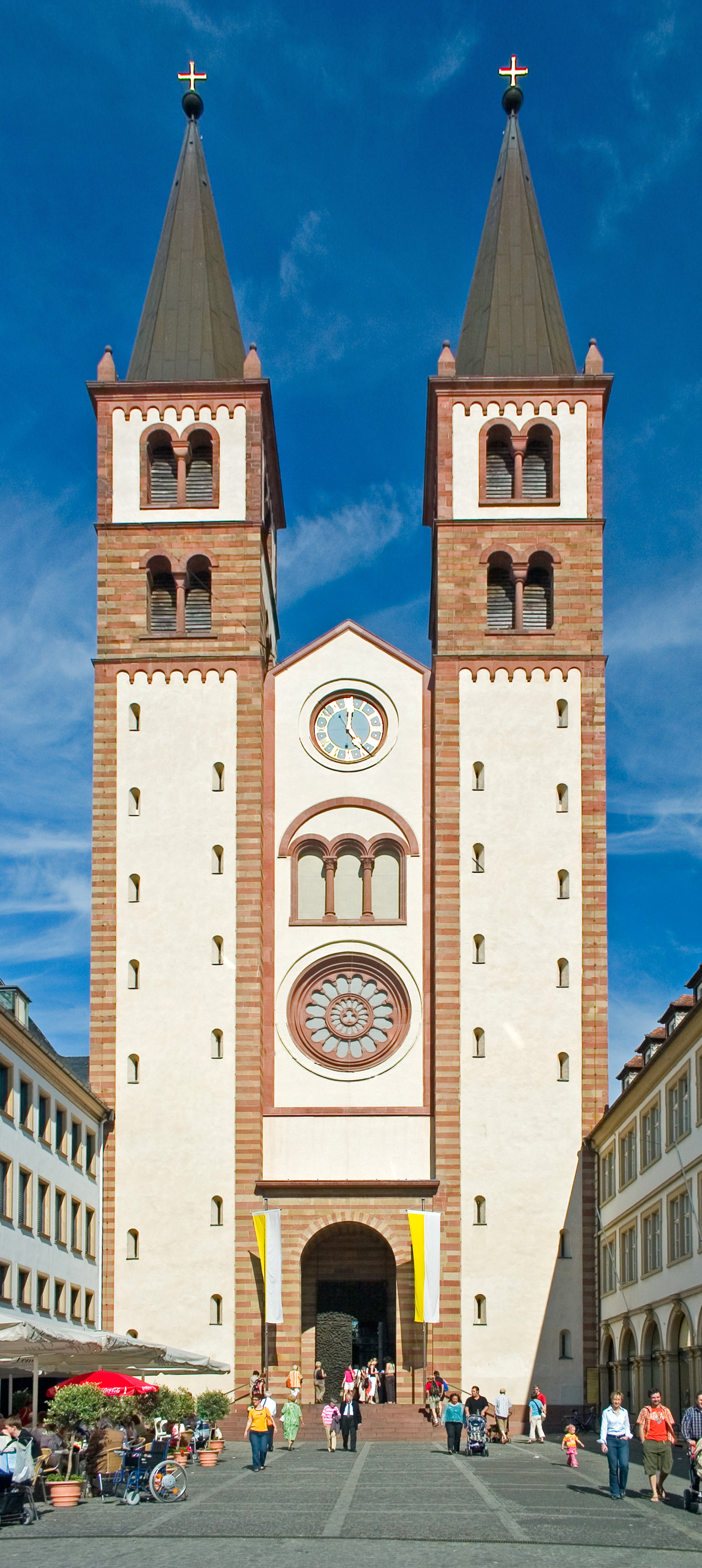
- Würzburg Cathedral

- Location in Germany Würzburg Cathedral (Germany)
- 49°47′36″N 9°55′56″E
- Location: Würzburg
- Country: Germany
- Denomination: Roman Catholic
- Website: Website of the Cathedral

History
- Status: Active
- Founded: 1040

Architecture
- Functional status: Cathedral
- Architectural type: Basilica
- Style: Romanesque with Gothic and Baroque elements
- Completed: 1075, 1967 (WWII damage)

Administration
- Province: Bamberg
- Diocese: Würzburg

Clergy
- Bishop: Franz Jung

Würzburg Cathedral (German: Würzburger Dom) is a Roman Catholic cathedral in Würzburg in Bavaria, Germany, dedicated to Saint Kilian. It is the seat of the Bishop of Würzburg and has served as the burial place for the Prince-Bishops of Würzburg for hundreds of years. With an overall length of 103 metres, it is the fourth largest Romanesque church building in Germany, and a masterpiece of German architecture from the Salian period. Notable later additions include work by Tilman Riemenschneider and Balthasar Neumann. The cathedral was heavily damaged by British bombs in March 1945 but rebuilt post-World War II.

== History ==
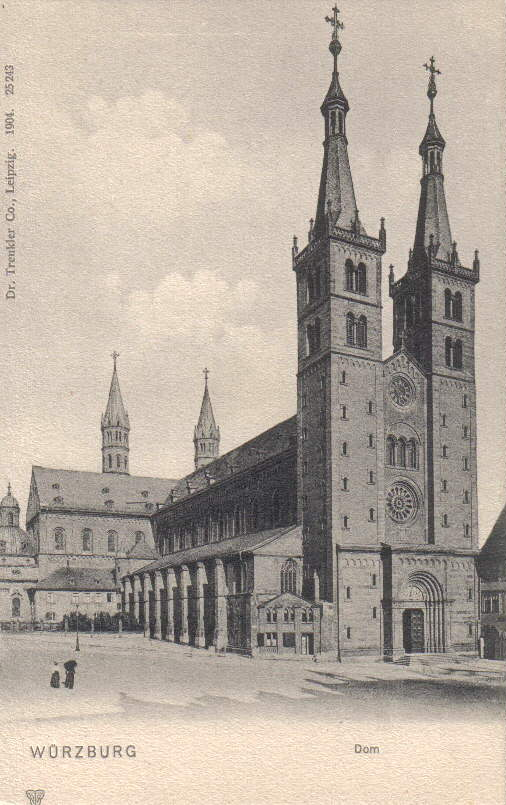
Würzburg Cathedral (1904)

A cathedral and an attached monastery existed in Würzburg as early as the 8th Century, presumably built by the city's first bishop, Burchard. On July 8, 752, Burchard transferred the relics of Kilian and his companions Totnan and Colman to the cathedral. The skulls of these three saints are still kept in the High Altar of the cathedral.

The cathedral was destroyed by fire and rebuilt twice (in 787 and 855). The third and present cathedral was built from 1040 onwards by Bishop Bruno. After Bruno's accidental death in 1045, his successor Adalbero completed the building in 1075. Due to several rebuildings, notably after 1133, the cathedral was only consecrated in 1187. It retains its Romanesque cruciform layout to this day.

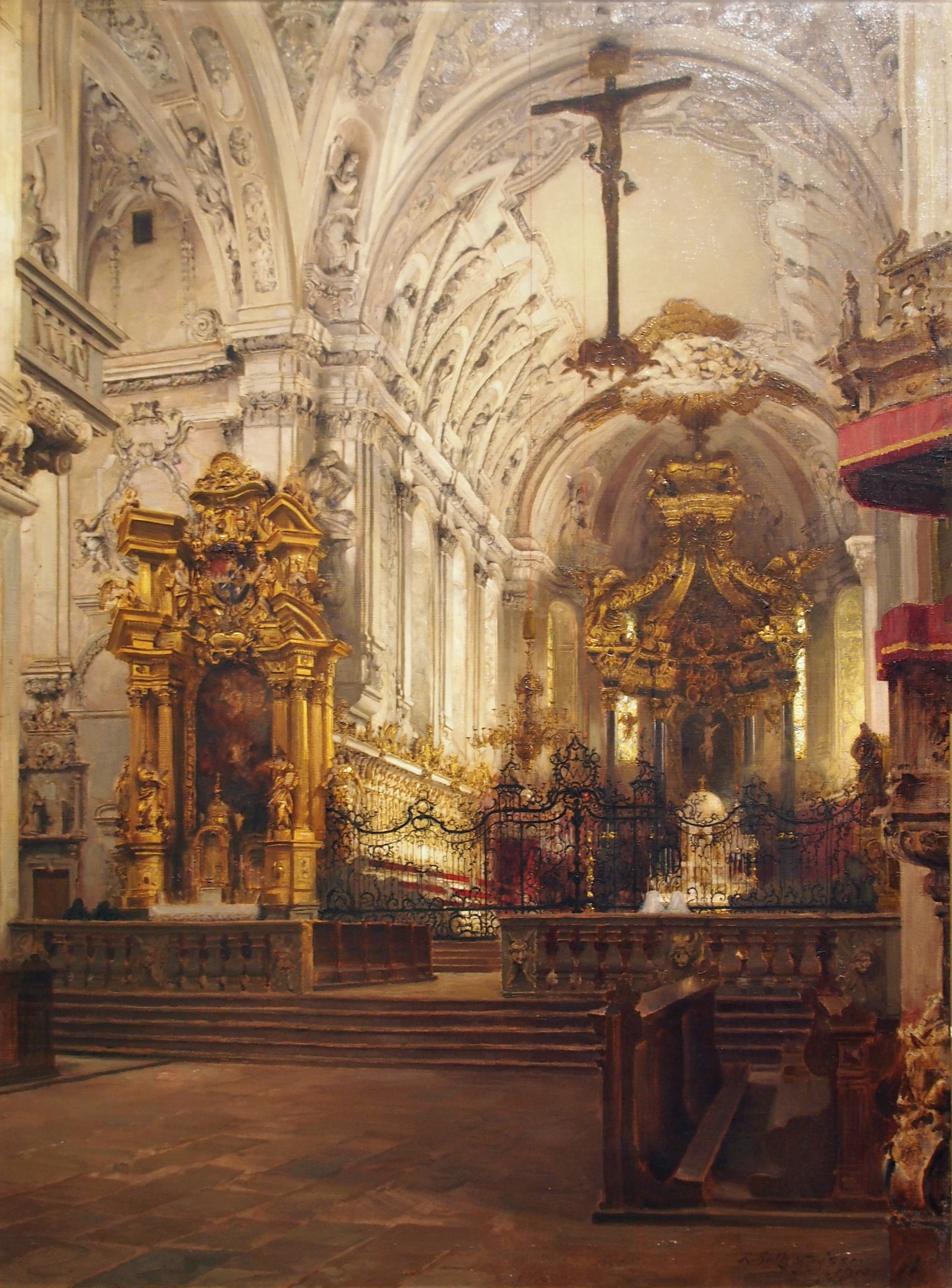
The interior of the Cathedral (1904)

The cathedral school attached to the cathedral and run by the Würzburg cathedral chapter was one of the most important cathedral schools in the Holy Roman Empire in the Middle Ages, along with those of Liège and Worms.

The side aisles were remodeled in a late Gothic style around 1500. A baroque renovation began in 1627, and continued through the century. In particular, numerous pieces of valuable Baroque art were created for the Cathedral's altars. The stuccoist Pietro Magno decorated the cathedral in Baroque stucco work in 1701-04.

In 1721-34, Balthasar Neumann built the burial chapel for the Schönborn bishops, north of the transept. Around the foot of the eastern tower, he also added a Baroque vestry and Ornatkammer (1749).

Additional Romanesque Revival changes made to the western façade and towers in 1879-85 (see picture of the cathedral in 1904) were removed after 1946.

The Cathedral was heavily damaged in the bombing of Würzburg. Much of the interior was irreparably damaged. Large portions of the building, especially the nave, collapsed in the winter of 1946, almost a year after the bombing. Reconstruction was completed in 1967, in the course of which some Baroque components were removed in favour of a re-Romanisation. In particular, the collapsed nave was rebuilt unadorned, with a flat wooden roof, providing a marked contrast to the surviving baroque stucco in the rest of the building. Over the course of the renovation, the Romanesque Revival west front with its rose window, tripartite gallery, and clock niche were covered by a plain stone wall. The west front was once again revealed after a 2006 renovation. The choir was redesigned in 1988.

== Description ==
With a length of 103 meters, the cathedral is thought to be the fourth largest Romanesque basilica in Germany.

=== Works of art ===
The cathedral contains numerous works of art, of which the following are of especial note:

- A series of tombs and epitaphs of bishops, including the monumental effigies of the prince-bishops Rudolf II von Scherenberg (1495) and Lorenz von Bibra (1519), both by Tilman Riemenschneider
- Schönborn Chapel by Balthasar Neumann and Maximilian von Welsch with the tombs of Johann Philipp von Schönborn, Lothar Franz von Schönborn, Johann Philipp Franz von Schönborn and Friedrich Karl von Schönborn
- Double crypt. The eastern part dates from 1040 and contains the tomb of Bruno. The western one (12th century) was demolished around 1700 but rebuilt after 1962. It features an old well, the tomb of Conrad of Querfurt and the oldest piece of art of the cathedral: a bearded face which may be Carolingean or even Merovingian in origin.
- Burial chapel/Sepulture: Like the chapter hall above, the Gothic structure was destroyed in the bombing raids but has been rebuilt. It now contains a cycle of stained glass by Georg Meistermann.
- Baptismal font (1279), by Meister Eckart of Worms
- Seven-armed candelabra (1981) by Andreas Moritz

=== Layout of the main level of the building ===
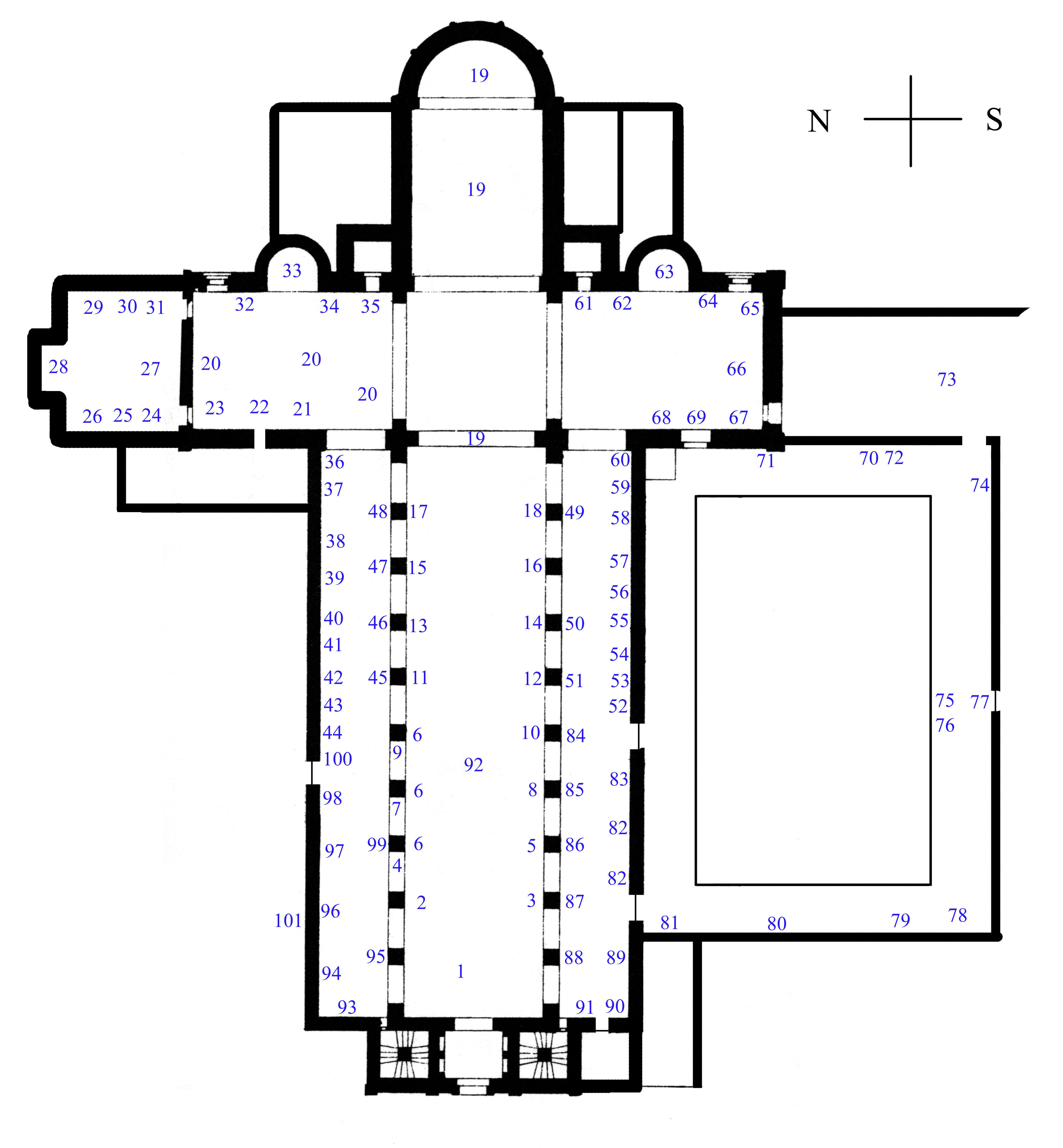
Floor plan

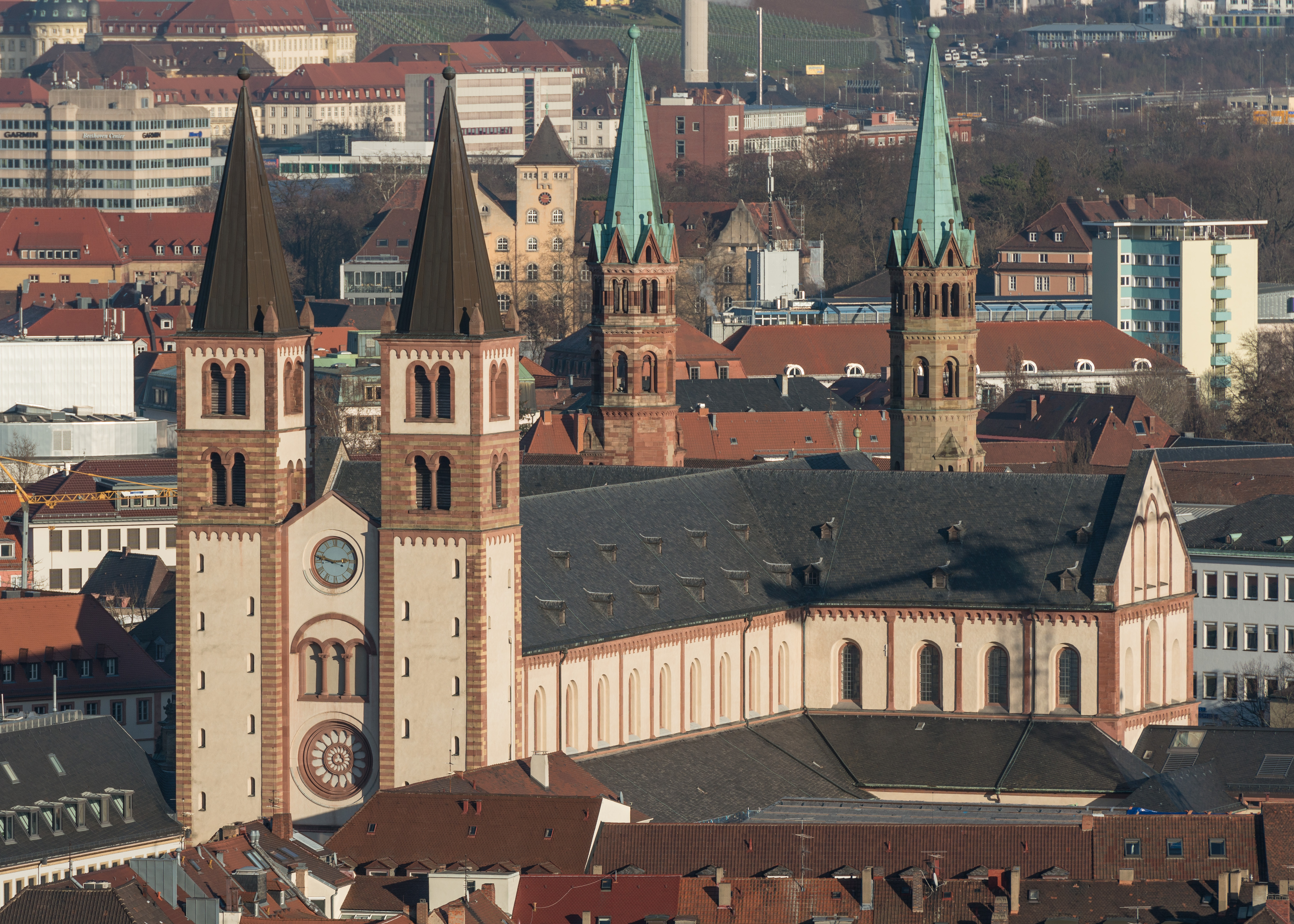
View of the cathedral from Marienberg Fortress

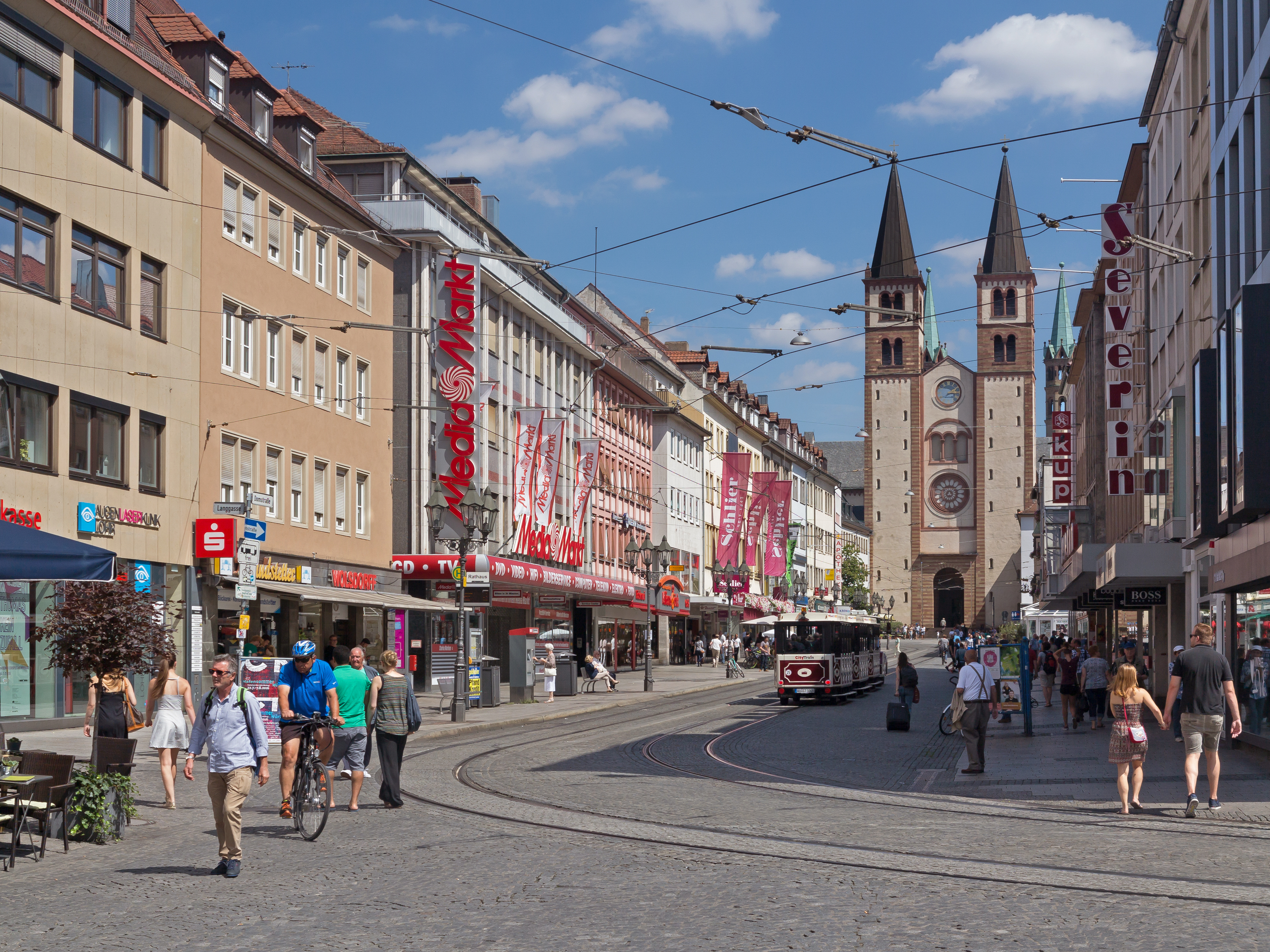
Würzburg Cathedral seen from Domstrasse

1. Trellis by Markus Gattinger (1750/52; outermost wings 1967, “Menorah” by Andreas Moritz, 1981)
2. Gottfried of Spitzberg (d. 1190)
3. Bishop Gottfried III von Hohenlohe (d. 1322)
4. Bishop Manegold von Neuenburg (d. 1303)
5. Bishop Otto II von Wolfskeel (d. 1345; by the so-called Wolfskeel Master)
6. Three kings with the Madonna
7. Bishop Wolfram von Grumbach (d. 1333)
8. Bishop Johann II von Brunn (d. 1440)
9. Bishop Albrecht II von Hohenlohe (d. 1372)
10. Bishop Gottfried IV Schenk von Limpurg (d. 1455)
11. Bishop Rudolf von Scherenberg (d. 1495; by Tilman Riemenschneider)
12. Bishop Melchior Zobel von Giebelstadt (d. 1558; by Peter Dell the Younger)
13. Bishop Lorenz von Bibra (d. 1519; by Tilman Riemenschneider)
14. Bishop Friedrich von Wirsberg (d. 1573)
15. Bishop Julius Echter von Mespelbrunn (d. 1617; by Nikolaus Lenkhart)
16. Chancel
17. Bishop Johann Gottfried von Aschhausen (d. 1622)
18. Ferdinand von Schlör (d. 1924)
19. Choir and apse in stucco relief
20. North transept altar and Provost's Altar (by Pietro Magno, 1704)
21. Provost Faust Franz Ludwig von Stromberg (d. 1673; by Johann Philipp Preiss)
22. Portal to the sacristy
23. Bishop Gerhard von Schwarzburg (d. 1400)
24. Lothar Franz von Schönborn (d. 1729)
25. Altar of Mary Magdalene
26. Johann Philipp Franz von Schönborn (d. 1724)
27. Fresco of the Resurrection (by Byss)
28. Door to the Schönborn Chapel, with angel (by Curé)
29. Bishop Friedrich Karl von Schönborn-Buchheim (d. 1746)
30. Altar of the Pietà
31. Bishop Johann Philipp von Schönborn, also Archbishop of Mainz and Bishop of Worms (d. 1673)
32. Bishop Conrad von Bibra (d. 1544; by Peter Dell the Elder)
33. Altar of Our Lady
34. Dean Johann Konrad Kottwitz von Aulenbach (d. 1610; by Zacharias Juncker)
35. Crypt entrance and exit
36. Bishop Konrad von Thüngen (d. 1540; bronze plate)
37. Bishop Conrad von Bibra (d. 1544; bronze plate; there is no mitre on the head of this figure, as although a bishop, this man was not consecrated as a priest)
38. Bishop Lorenz von Bibra (d. 1519; bronze plate, by Hans Vischer and Peter Vischer the Elder)
39. Erasmus Neustetter known as Stürmer (d. 1594; bronze plate)
40. Johann Philipp Fuchs von Dornheim (d. 1727; bronze plate)
41. Richard von der Kere (d. 1583; bronze plate)
42. Albrecht von Bibra, dean of the cathedral chapter (d. 1511; bronze plate)
43. Gg. von Giech (d. 1501; bronze plate)
44. Philipp Adolf von Ehrenberg (d. 1631; bronze plate)
45. Bishop Franz Ludwig von Erthal (d. 1795)
46. Gg. Anton von Stahl (d. 1870)
47. Johann Valentin Reissmann (d. 1875)
48. Franz Josef von Stein (d. 1909)
49. Adam Friedrich Gross von Trockau (d. 1840)
50. Georg Karl von Fechenbach (d. 1808)
51. Bishop Christoph Franz von Hutten (d. 1729)
52. Mural of Saints Felix, Regula and Exuberantius
53. Bishop Adam Friedrich von Seinsheim (d. 1779)
54. Peter von Aufsess (d. 1522; bronze plate)
55. Johann von Guttenberg (d. 1538; bronze plate)
56. Erasmus Neustetter known as Stürmer (d. 1594; bronze plate)
57. Johann Konrad Kottwitz von Aulenbach (d. 1610; bronze plate)
58. Bishop Melchior Zobel von Giebelstadt (d. 1558; bronze plate)
59. Bishop Friedrich von Wirsberg (d. 1573; bronze plate)
60. Bishop Julius Echter von Mespelbrunn (d. 1617; bronze plate)
61. The Death of Mary (sculptural group)
62. Neithart von Thüngen, Bishop of Bamberg and Provost of Würzburg (d. 1598; by Hans Juncker)
63. Apostles' Altar (three statues by Tilman Riemenschneider, 1502/06)
64. Bishop Konrad II von Thüngen (d. 1540; by Loy Hering)
65. Moritz von Hutten (d. 1552)
66. Dean's Altar (by Pietro Magno)
67. Georg Heinrich von Stadion (d. 1716)
68. Bernhard von Solms (Lich) (d. 1553)
69. Doorway to cloister
70. Heinrich Truchsess von Wetzhausen (d. 1548)
71. Jakob Baur von Eiseneck (d. 1621)
72. Paul Truchsess von Wetzhausen-Unsleben (d. 1528)
73. Burial chapel
74. Jakob Fuchs von Wonfurt (d. 1558)
75. Heinrich von Seinsheim (d. 1360)
76. Ebbo (?) (10th century)
77. Master of the cathedral school (late Gothic)
78. Crucifixion Group (1763)
79. Friedrich von Brandenburg (d. 1536)
80. Old cathedral school gate 1565
81. Saint Kilian (1720, by Esterbauer)
82. Wall painting fragments of Christ and Mary, and of Mary and Saint John the Evangelist
83. Door to the cloister and two late Gothic coats of arms (Scherenberg and Grumbach)
84. Johann von Grumbach (d. 1466)
85. Johann von Egloffstein (d. 1411)
86. Johann Vitus von Würtzburg (d. 1756; bronze plate)
87. Vitus Gottfried von Wernau (d. 1649; bronze plate)
88. Sebastian Echter von Mespelbrunn (brother of bishop; d. 1575)
89. Martin von der Kere (d. 1507; bronze relief) and Konrad Friedrich von Thüngen (d. 1629; bronze relief)
90. Pillar of Jachin, 11th century
91. Pillar of Booz, 11th century
92. Bronze baptismal font by Master Eckard of Worms, 1279
93. Pietà (c. 1410), acquired in 1966
94. Heraldic fragment of gravestone of Provost Daniel von Stibar (d. 1555)
95. Gravestone of Johann Philipp Echter von Mespelbrunn (d. 1665; note the inverted coat-of-arms to signify the last male member of a family)
96. Fragment of gravestone of Lorenz Truchsess von Pommersfelden (d. 1543)
97. Dean Franz Christ. von Rosenbach (d. 1687; by Sebastian Betz)
98. Johann Philipp Ludwig Ignaz von Franckenstein (d. 1780; by Franz Martin Mutschele)
99. Saint John the Evangelist (by Tilman Riemenschneider)
100. Coat-of-arms of the Elector Johann Philipp von Schönborn (d. 1673)
101. Grave of Tilman Riemenschneider (copy of original tombstone)

=== Organs ===
The main organ was built in 1969 by the organ builders Klais. There is a second organ for the choir, and a third is planned for 2010.

=== Bells ===
The cathedral today has 20 bells, with a total combined weight of 26 tons. 11 bells are cast in 1965, and 8 very small bells called cymbal bells are cast in 2006. The oldest bell in the cathedral is the Lobdeburg Bell, it was cast by Cunradus Citewar of Würzburg, the most prominent bellfounder of his time, dates from 1257. Because it was taken down in 1933 and stored in the crypt, it is the only ancient bell of the cathedral to have survived the firestorm caused by the bombing of 16 March 1945. It now hangs in the south-west tower and is rung every Friday at 3:00 p.m., to mark the hour of the death of Jesus Christ. The largest bell or bourdon is the Salvator Bell and it weighs 10 tons.

All the other bells melted and the liquid metal ran down into the basement of the towers, where the stored cathedral treasure was destroyed.

Bell Number	Bell Name	Foundry & Year of Casting	Diameter (mm)	Note	Tower
1	Salvator (Bourdon Bell)	Friedrich Wilhelm Schilling, 1965	2.318	g^{0} ±0	South
2	Kilian, Kolonat und Totnan (Märtyrer) (2nd Bourdon Bell)	Friedrich Wilhelm Schilling, 1965	1.765	b^{0} ±0	North
3	Osanna	Friedrich Wilhelm Schilling, 1965	1.573	c^{1} ±0	North
4	Maria	Friedrich Wilhelm Schilling, 1965	1.487	d^{1} ±0	North
5	Lobdeburg	Mag. Cunradus Citewar, 1257	1.270	es^{1} +5	South
6	Michael	F. W. Schilling, 1965	1.237	f^{1} ±0	North
7	Peter und Paul	F. W. Schilling, 1965	1.104	g^{1} ±0	North
8	Bruno	F. W. Schilling, 1965	1.087	a^{1} ±0	North
9	Andreas	F. W. Schilling, 1965	1.023	b^{1} ±0	North
10	Evangelisten	F. W. Schilling, 1965	910	c^{2} ±0	North
11	Josef	F. W. Schilling, 1965	808	d^{2} ±0	North
12	Martin	F. W. Schilling, 1965	751	f^{2} ±0	North
13	Frieden	Rudolf Perner, 2008	600	g^{2} ±0	South
14	Kreuz	Rudolf Perner, 2008	527	a^{2} ±0	South
15	Kapitel	Rudolf Perner, 2008	502	b^{2} +2	South
16	Chor	Rudolf Perner, 2008	447	c^{3} +2	South
17	Augustinus	Rudolf Perner, 2008	393	d^{3} +1	South
18	Salve Regina	Rudolf Perner, 2008	371	es^{3} +3	South
19	Auferstehung	Rudolf Perner, 2008		f^{3}	South
20	Bürger	Rudolf Perner, 2008		g^{3}	South

== Würzburg Synod ==
Between 1971 and 1975, the Würzburg Synod convened in the cathedral at the wish of Cardinal Döpfner, to determine the application of the Second Vatican Council to Germany.

== Images ==
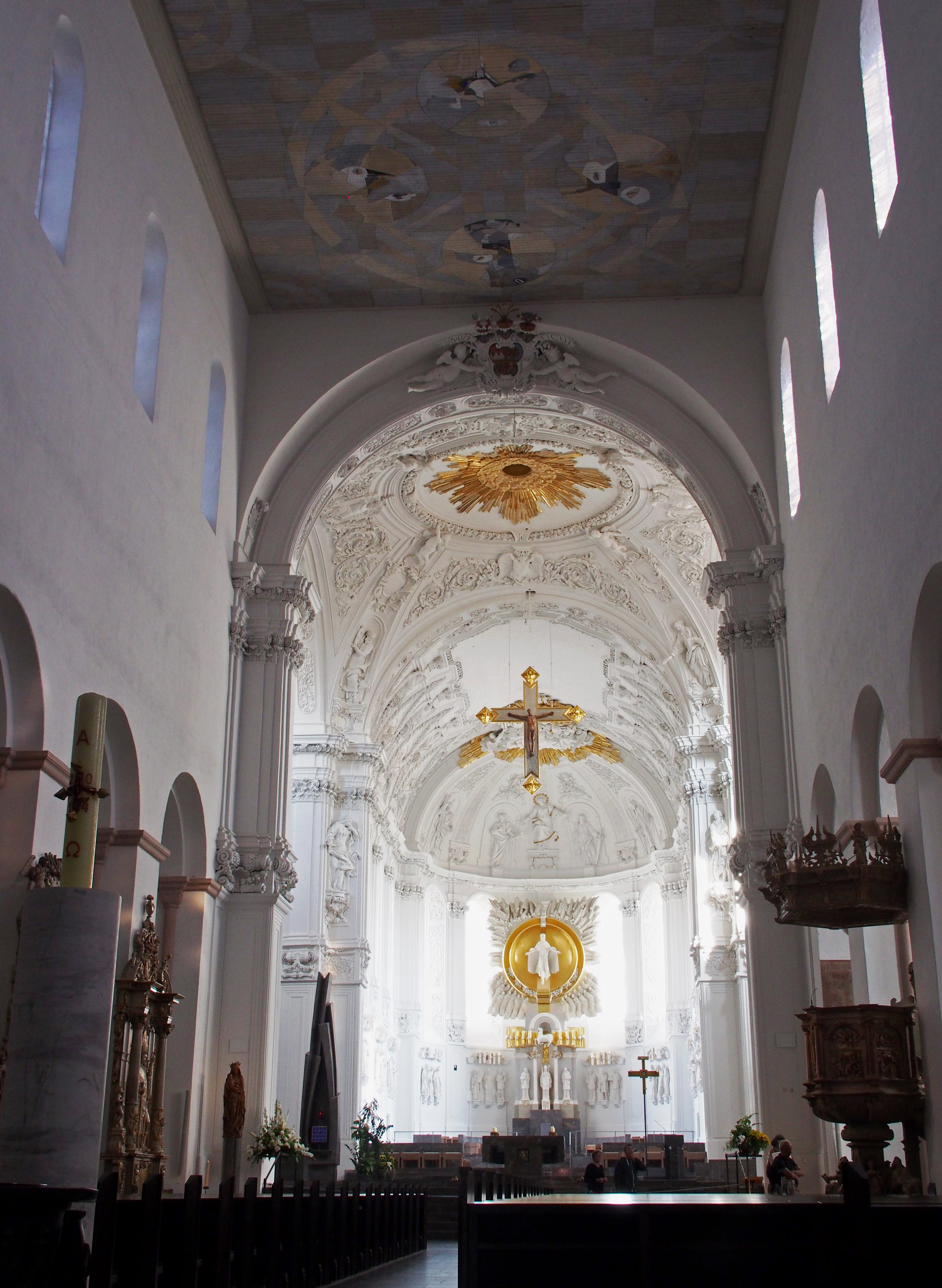
The nave, triumphal cross, and apse

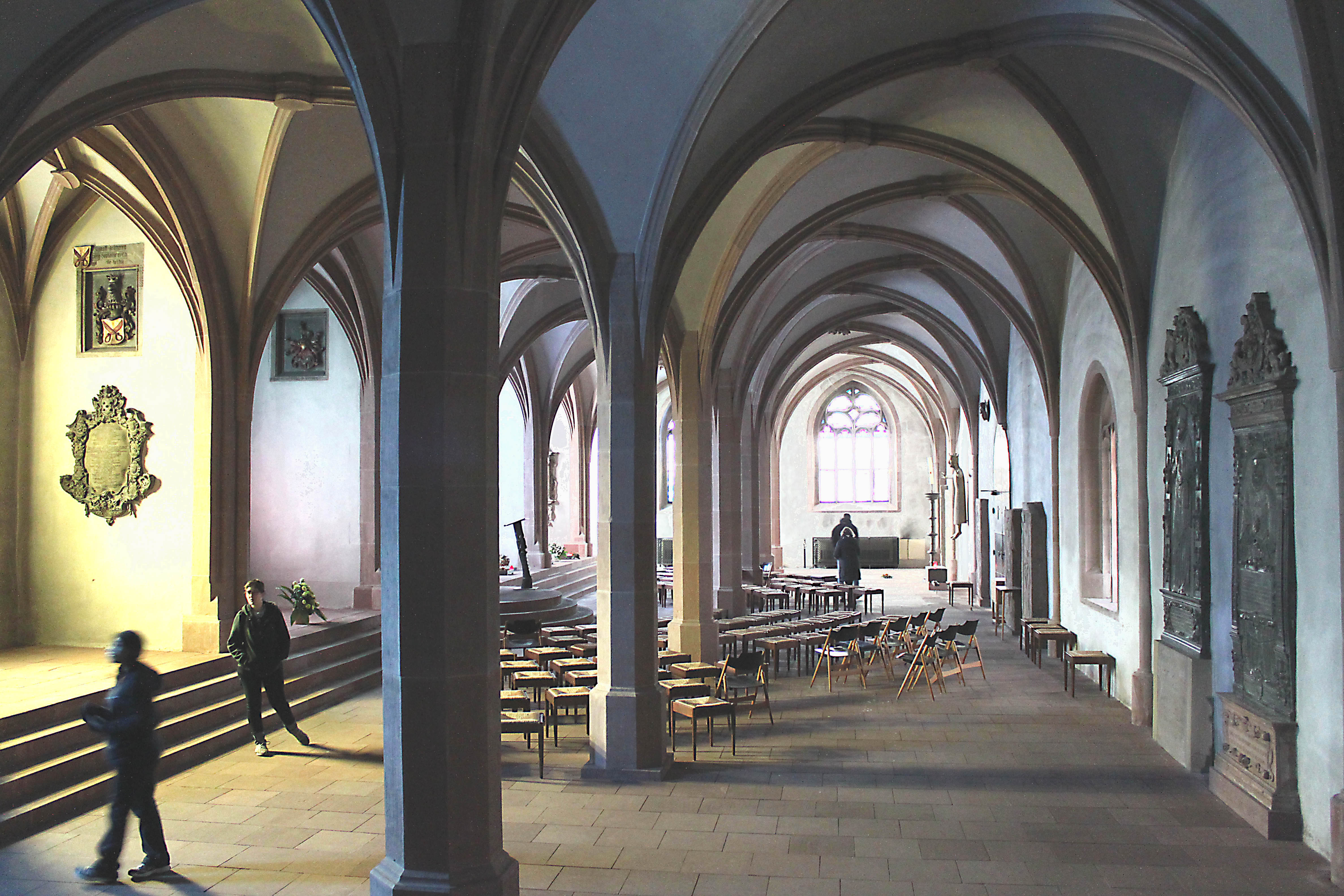
Sepulture Chapel

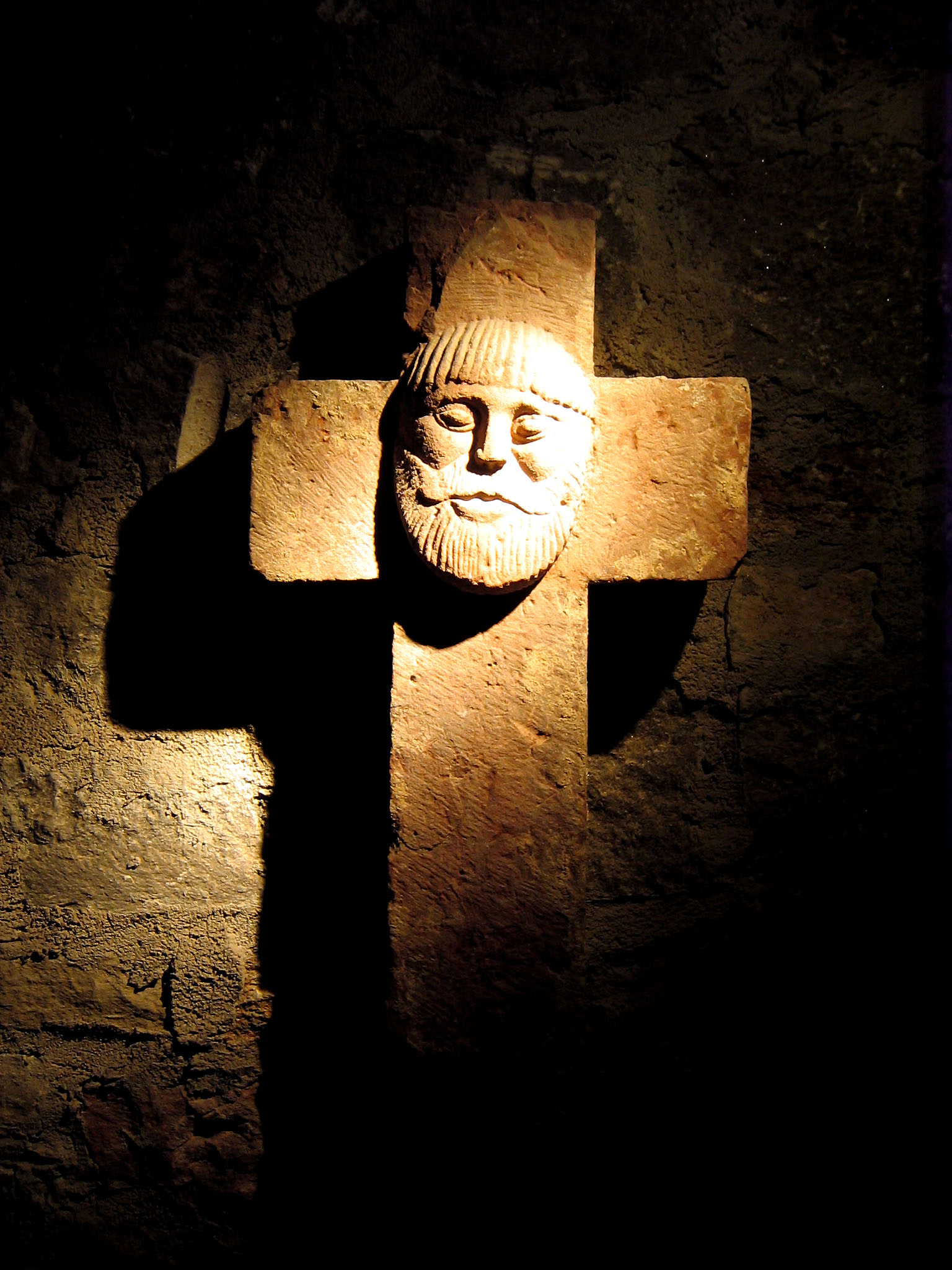
Merovingian cross in the crypt

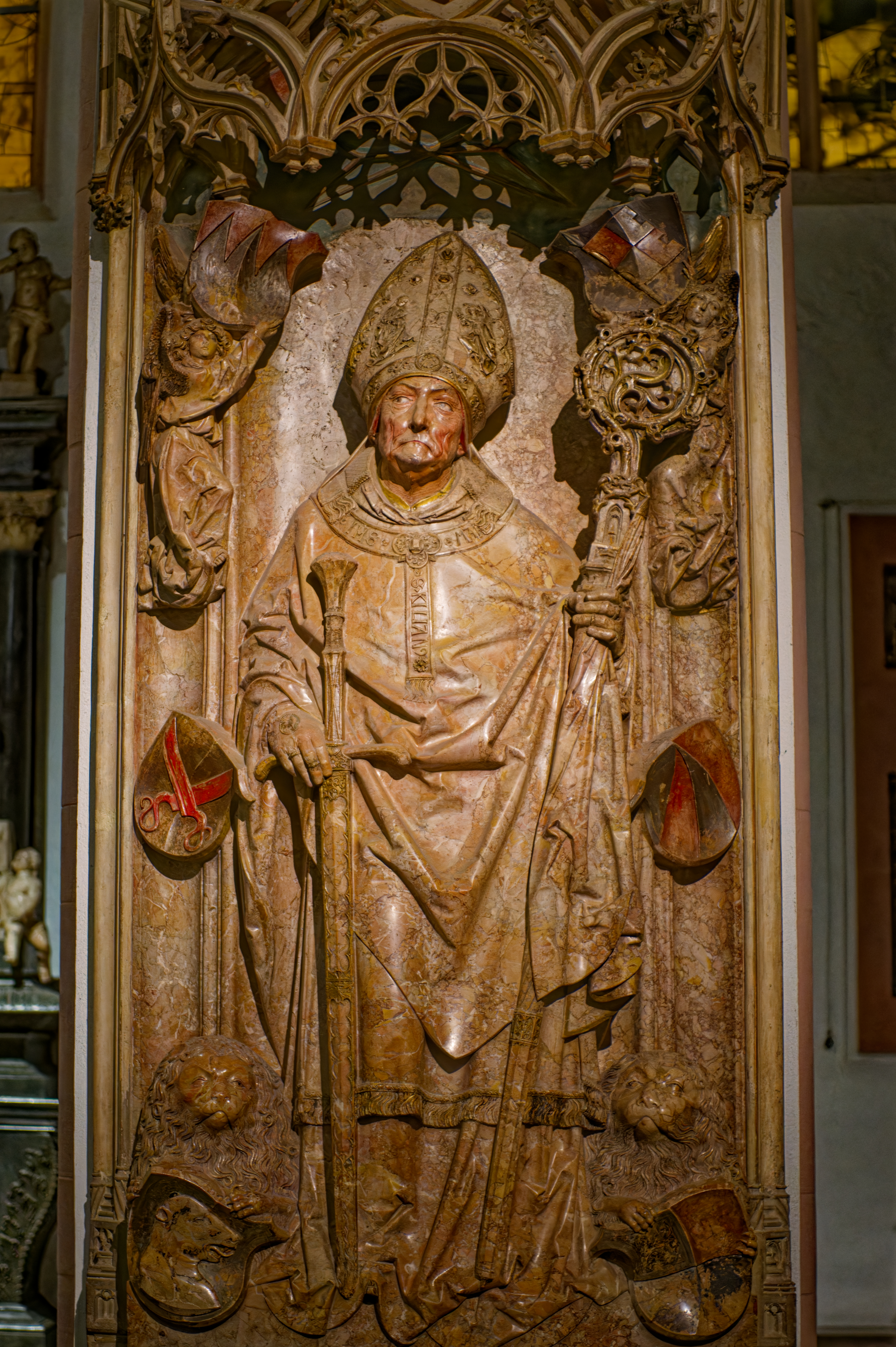
Effigy of Bishop Rudolf II von Scherenberg, by Tilman Riemenschneider

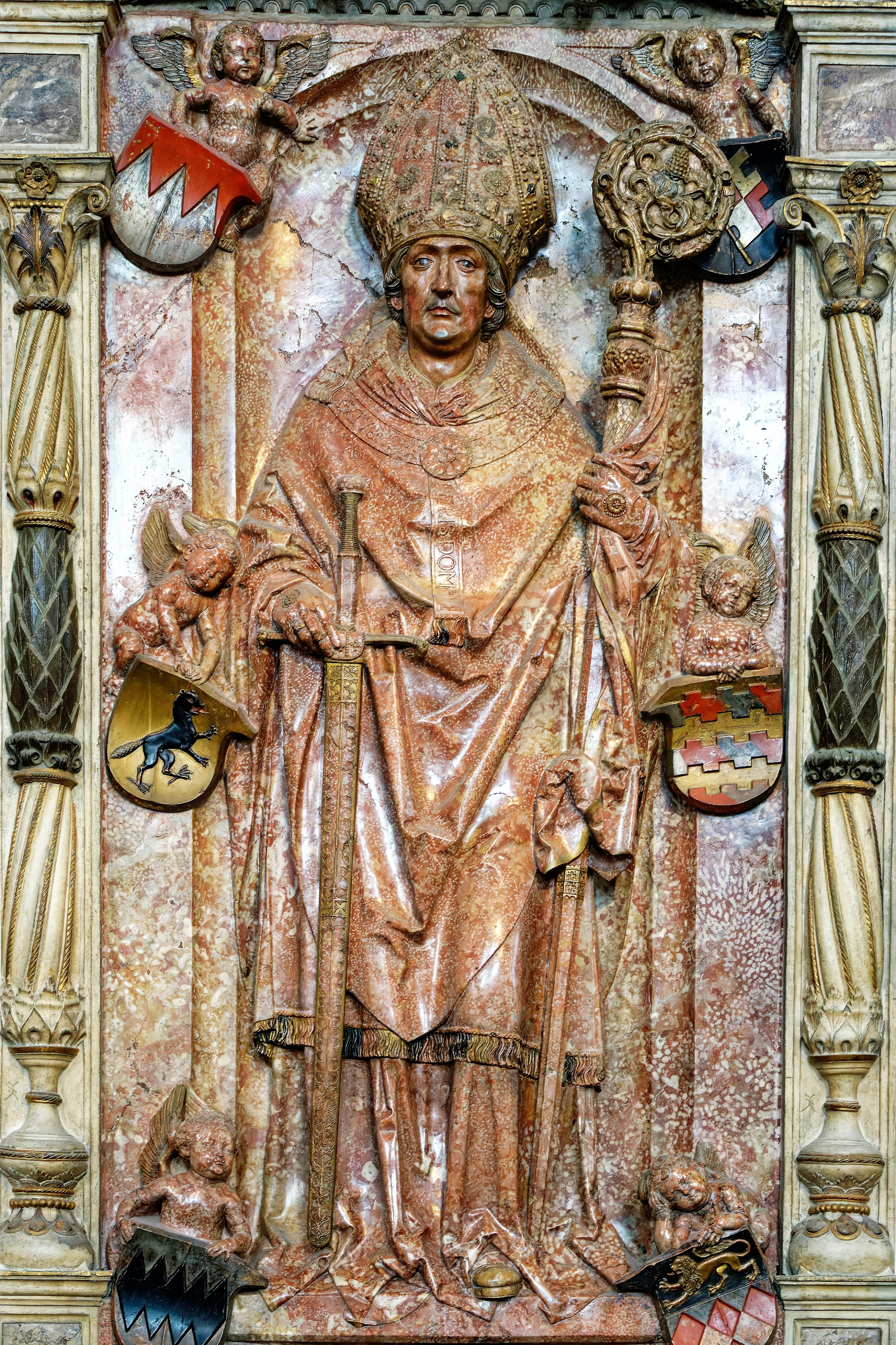
Effigy of Lorenz von Bibra, Tilman Riemenschneider

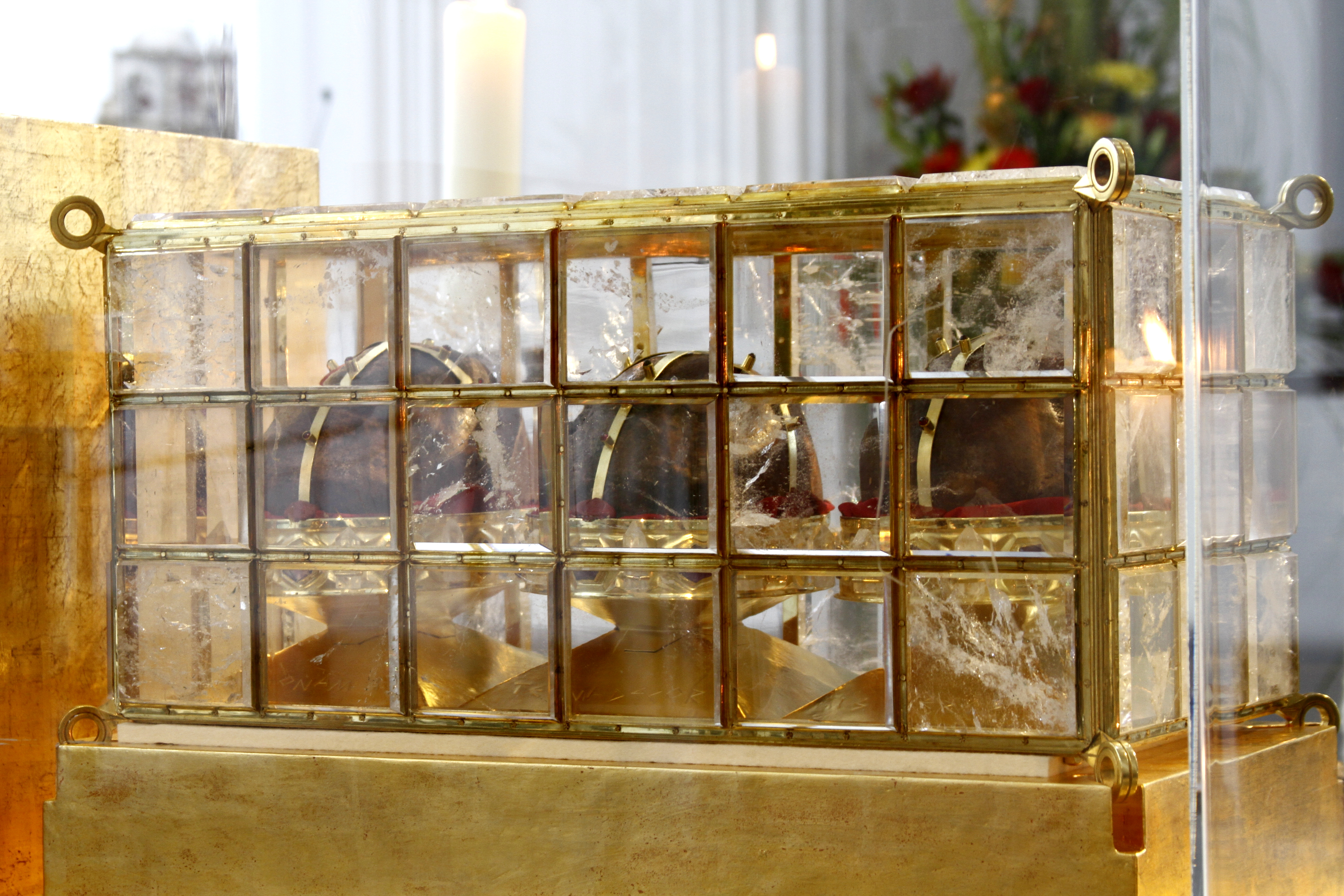
Relic of Kilian, Colman and Totnan

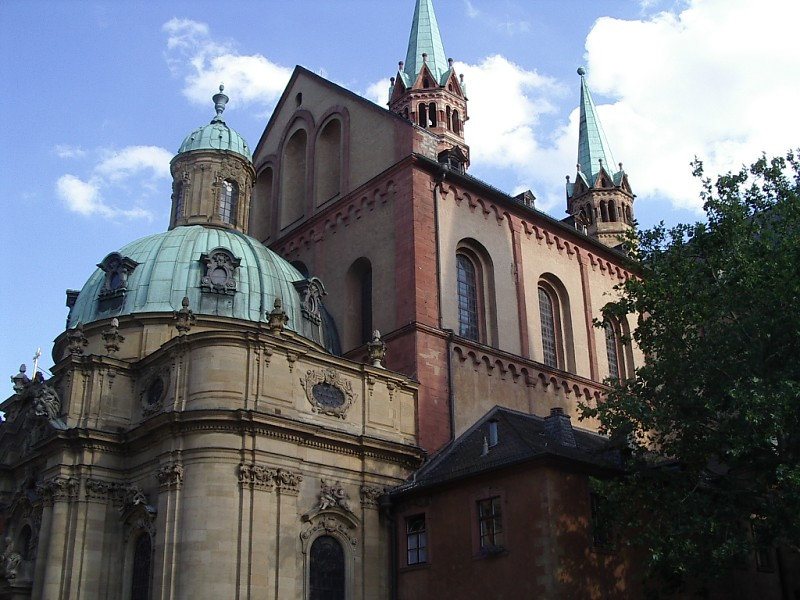
North transept and Schönborn Chapel

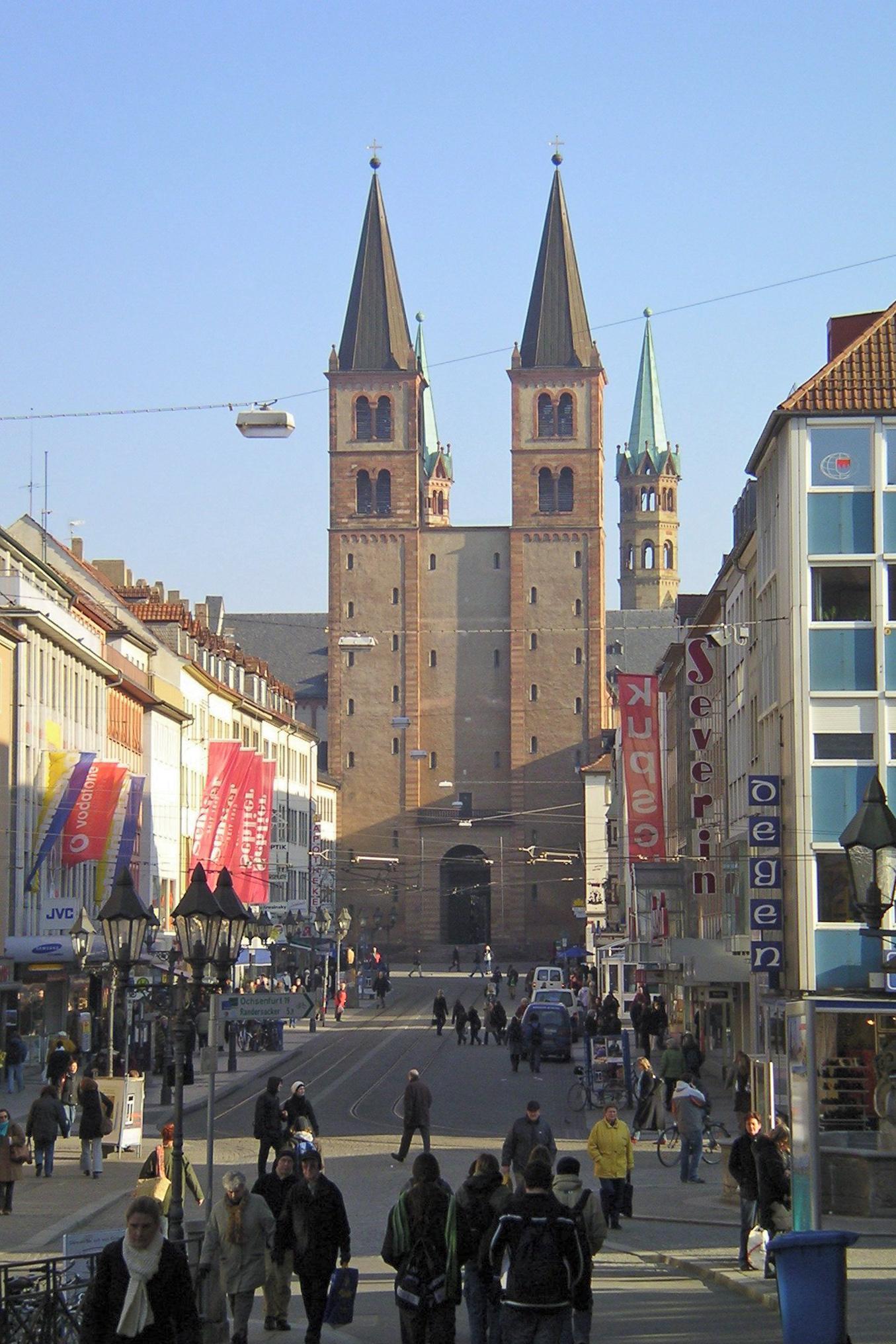
The west front of the Cathedral in 2006

== Sources ==
- Kuhn, Rudolf, 1968: Großer Führer durch Würzburgs Dom und Neumünster: mit Neumünster-Kreuzgang und Walthergrab
- Der Dom zu Würzburg (English Edition) Schnell, Art Guide No 232 (of 1982); Second English edition 1991, Verlag Schnell & Steiner GMBH, Munich and Zurich
