= Konrad von Würzburg (disambiguation) =

Konrad von Würzburg (died 1287) was a German lyric poet.

Konrad von Würzburg or Conrad of Würzburg may also refer to:

- Conrad of Querfurt, bishop of Würzburg (1198–1202)
- Konrad von Thüngen, bishop of Würzburg (1519–1540)
- Conrad von Bibra, bishop of Würzburg (1540–1544)
- Konrad Wilhelm von Wernau, bishop of Würzburg (1683–1684)
