= Friedrich von Wirsberg =

The Most Reverend Friedrich von Wirsberg
- Prince-Bishop of Würzburg
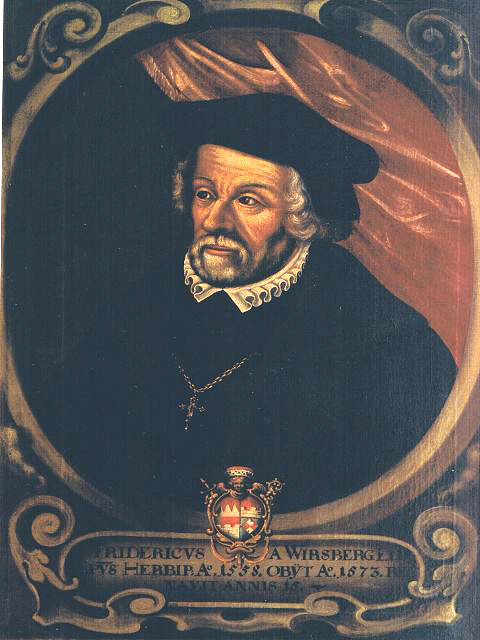
- Church: Roman Catholic
- Installed: 4 November 1558
- Term ended: 12 November 1573
- Predecessor: Melchior Zobel von Giebelstadt
- Successor: Julius Echter von Mespelbrunn

Orders
- Ordination: 28 February 1545
- Consecration: 9 April 1559

Personal details
- Born: 16 November 1507 Glashütten, Bavaria
- Died: 12 November 1573 (aged 65) near Marienberg Fortress

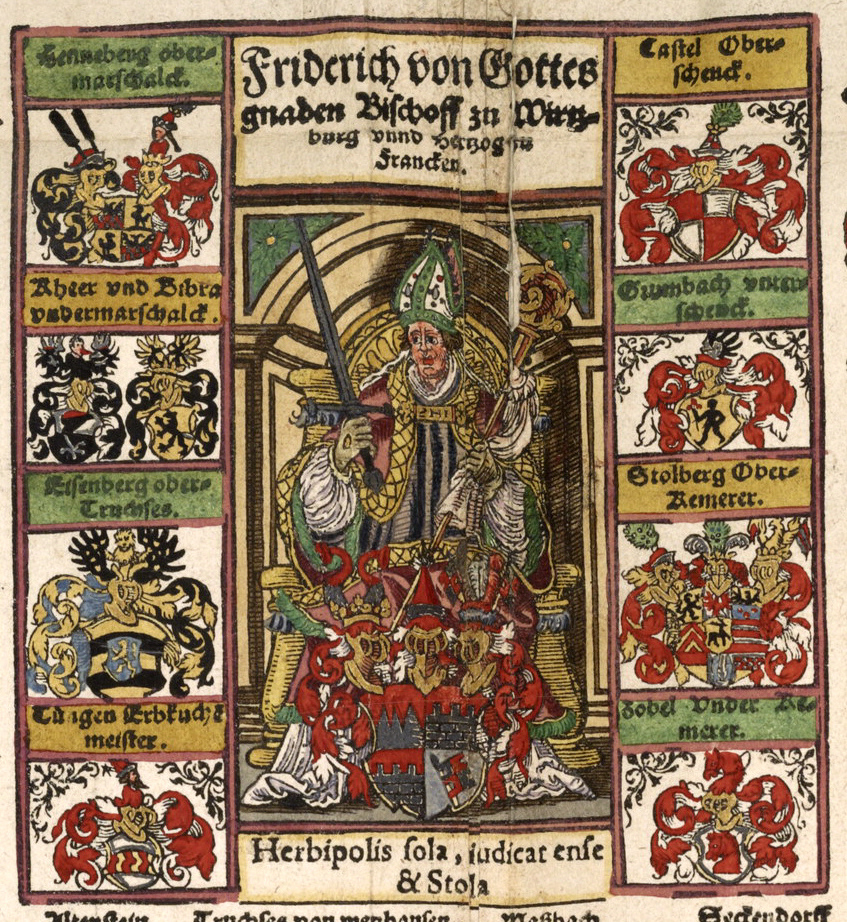
Contemporary armorial showing Bishop Friedrich von Wirsberg and his coat of arms

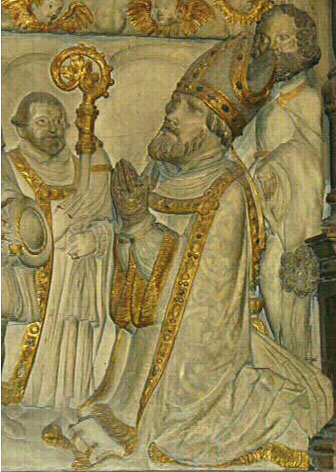
Friedrich von Wirsberg Epitaph in Würzburg Dom

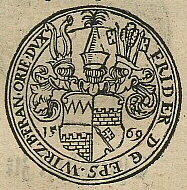
Friedrich von Wirsberg coat of arms from 1569

Friedrich von Wirsberg (16 November 1507 – 12 November 1573) was the Prince-Bishop of Würzburg from 1558 to 1573.

Friedrich von Wirsberg was born in Glashütten, Bavaria on November 16, 1507.

On April 15, 1558, Melchior Zobel von Giebelstadt, Prince-Bishop of Würzburg, was assassinated by the forces of Wilhelm von Grumbach. The cathedral chapter of Würzburg Cathedral elected Friedrich von Wirsberg as Zobel's successor on April 27, 1558. Von Grumbach claimed he was not involved in the murder of Zobel, but Bishop von Wirsberg was determined to bring von Grumbach to justice. Von Grumbach, along with Albert Alcibiades, Margrave of Brandenburg-Kulmbach, sought refuge in the Kingdom of France.

In 1560, von Wirsberg expelled all Jews from the Prince-Bishopric of Würzburg.

He died on November 12, 1573, and is buried in Würzburg Cathedral (grave #14, grave plate #59 on diagram).

Catholic Church titles
Preceded by Melchior Zobel von Giebelstadt	Prince-Bishop of Würzburg; 1558–1573	Succeeded by Julius Echter von Mespelbrunn
