= Melchior Zobel von Giebelstadt =

Bishop of Wurtzburg

- Prince-Bishop of Würzburg
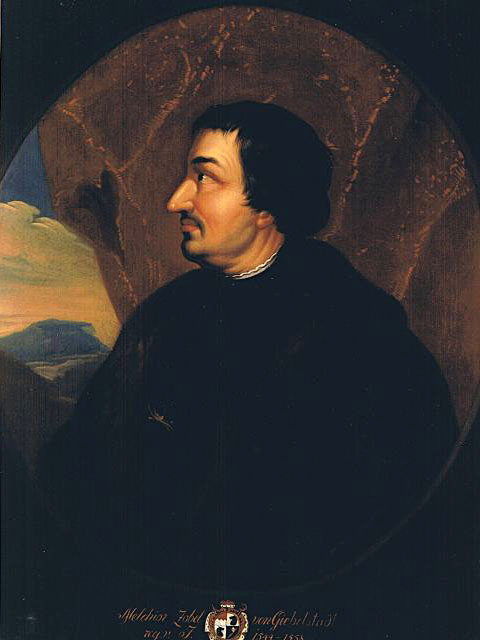
- Melchior Zobel von Giebelstadt
- See: Würzburg
- Appointed: 27 October 1544
- Term ended: 15 April 1558
- Predecessor: Konrad von Bibra
- Successor: Friedrich von Wirsberg

Personal details
- Born: c. 1502 Giebelstadt
- Died: 15 April 1558 (aged 55–56)
- Denomination: Roman Catholic
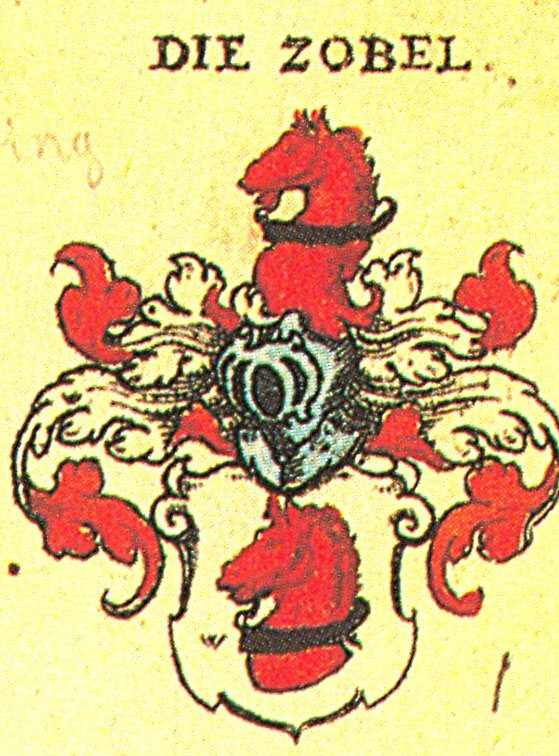
- Coat of arms

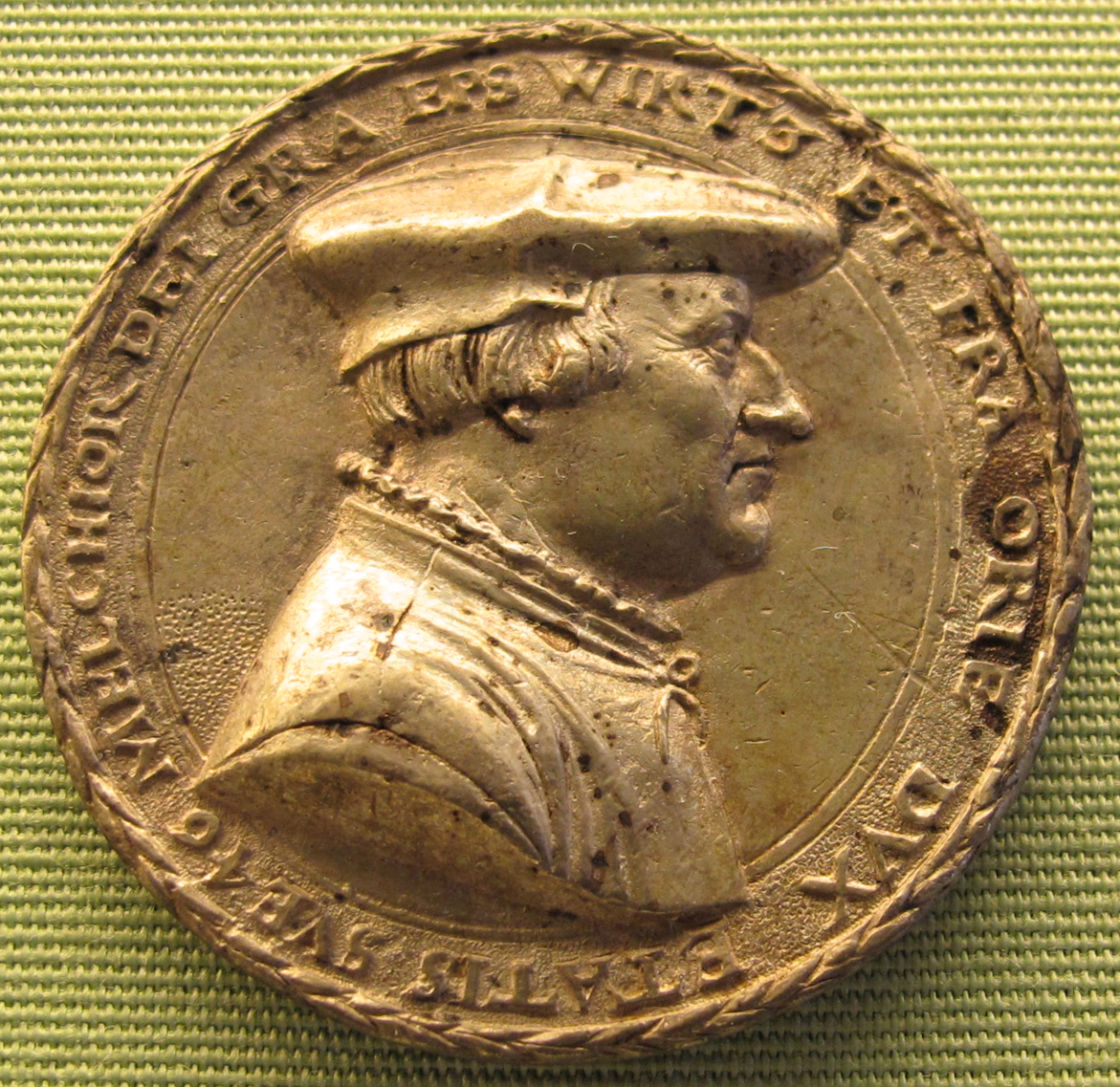
Melchior Zobel von Giebelstadt by Joachim Deschler, 1551

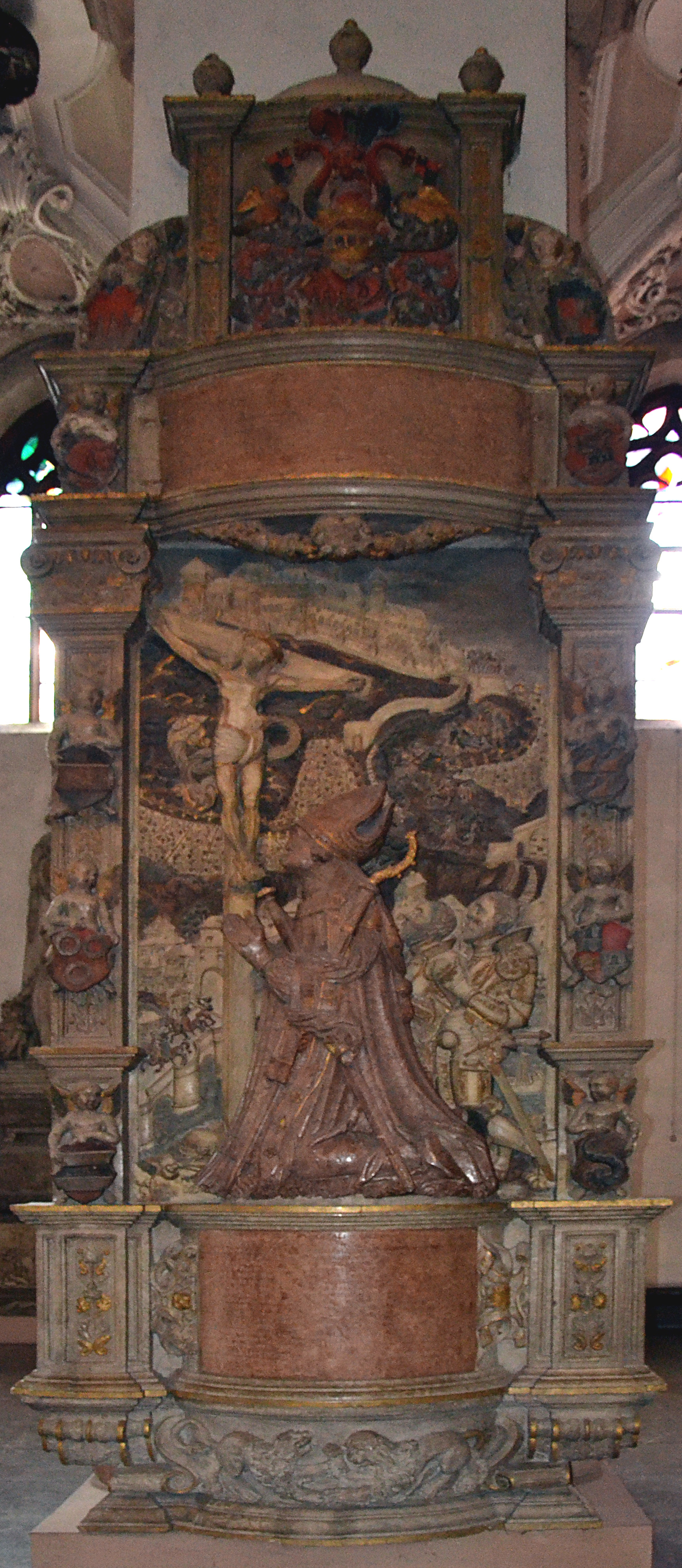
Grave Würzburg Cathedral

Melchior Zobel von Giebelstadt (1502–1558) was the Prince-Bishop of Würzburg from 1544 to 1558.

Melchior Zobel von Giebelstadt was born in 1502, the son of Georg Zobel and his wife Dorothea Rüdt von Callenberg. As a younger son, he was groomed for a career in the church from an early age. He became a canon (Domizellar) of Würzburg Cathedral on 27 January 1521. He studied at the University of Wittenberg in summer semester 1521. He spent winter semester 1521 studying at the University of Leipzig. He became a Domherr of Würzburg Cathedral in 1522. On 4 March 1540 he was elected dean of Würzburg Cathedral and was subsequently ordained as a priest. Following the death of Bishop Konrad von Thüngen, Zobel von Giebelstadt was a candidate to replace him as Prince-Bishop of Würzburg, but he lost the election, held on 1 July 1540, to Conrad von Bibra.

On 19 August 1544 the cathedral chapter of Würzburg Cathedral elected him as the new Prince-Bishop of Würzburg. A delegation from the cathedral chapter informed Charles V, Holy Roman Emperor of his election on 22 August 1544 and Pope Paul III confirmed his appointment on 27 October 1544.

During the Schmalkaldic War of 1546–47, he allied the Prince-Bishopric of Würzburg with the pro-Catholic imperial forces. That war ended when the Diet of Augsburg of 1547-48 declared the Augsburg Interim. Zobel von Giebelstadt's opposition to the Augsburg Interim led to him and six other prelates being personally rebuked by Charles V at an audience held on 9 April 1548.

As bishop, Zobel von Giebelstadt was fiercely opposed to the efforts of Friedrich Bernbeck (1511–70), mayor of Kitzingen to introduce the Reformation in Kitzingen. He attempted to found a Jesuit university in 1556, but this effort failed as the order was unable to provide a sufficient number of priests to staff the proposed university.

== Grumbach-Zobel Affair ==
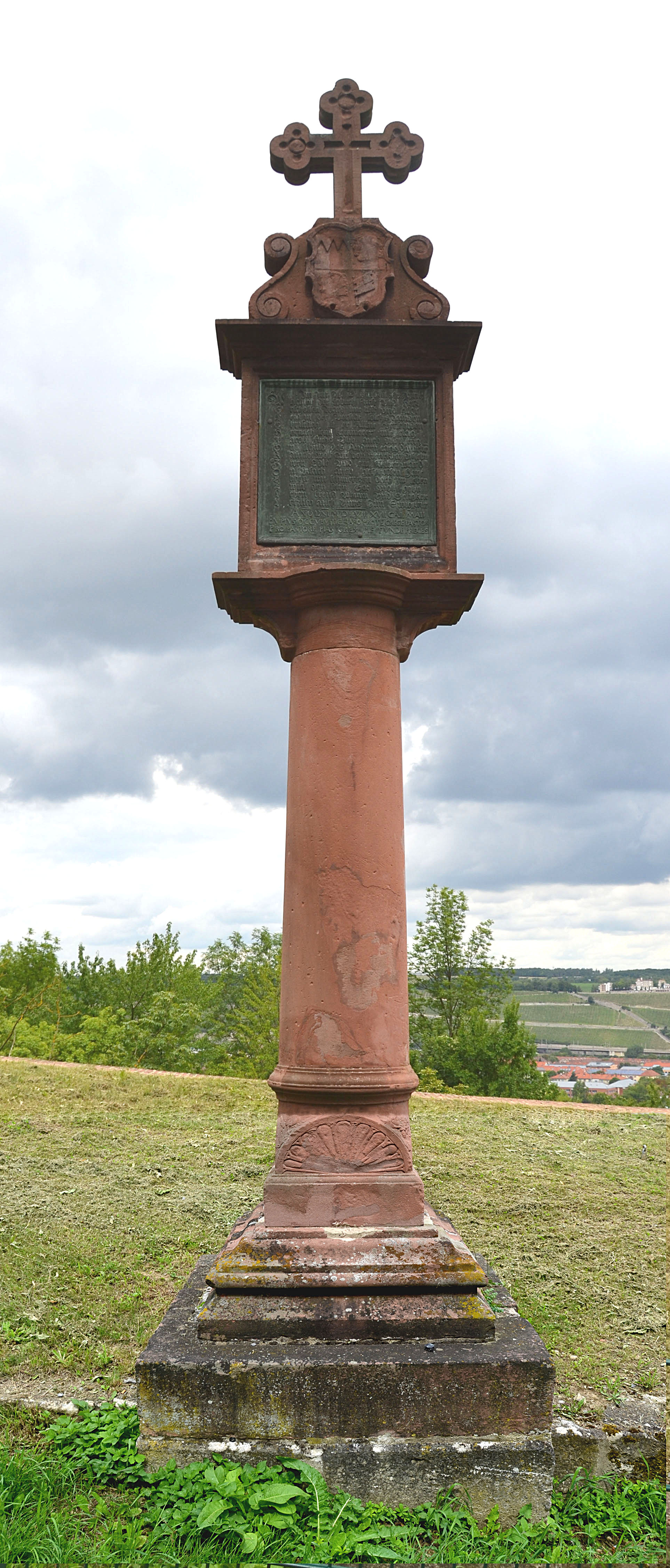
Spot where Melchior Zobel von Giebelstadt died after assassination by Grumbach's henchman Christoph Kretzen

Throughout his prelacy, Zobel von Giebelstadt was engaged in a feud with Wilhelm von Grumbach. About 1540 Grumbach became associated with Margrave Casimir's son, the turbulent Albert Alcibiades of Bayreuth, whom he served both in peace and war. As a landholder, Grumbach was a vassal of the Würzburg Bishops and had held office at the court of Conrad von Bibra, who was elected Prince-Bishop in 1540. Just before his death in 1544, Conrad gave Grumbach 10,000 gold florins as a gift, without obtaining the consent of the cathedral chapter. When the new Prince-Bishop, Melchior Zobel von Giebelstadt, asked for the money back from Grumbach, he paid, but the harmonious relationship between lord and vassal were destroyed. Unable to free himself and his associates from the suzerainty of the bishop by appealing to the imperial courts he decided to adopt more violent measures, and his friendship with Margrave Albert was very serviceable in this connection.

After the conclusion of the Peace of Passau in 1552, Grumbach assisted Albert in his career of plunder in Franconia during the Second Margrave War and was thus able to take some revenge upon his enemy, Melchior Zobel. Albert's career, however, was checked by his defeat at the Battle of Sievershausen in July 1553 and his subsequent flight to France, while the Würzburg bishop took advantage of this state of affairs to seize Grumbach's lands. The knight obtained an order of restitution from the Imperial Chamber Court (Reichskammergericht), but he was unable to carry this into effect. Grumbach's men attempted to assassinate Zobel von Giebelstadt three times. On 15 April 1558 Zobel (like Florian Geyer earlier) was seized and killed by Grumbach's henchman Christoph Kretzen. Grumbach declared he was innocent of this crime, but his story was not believed, and he fled to France.

Catholic Church titles
Preceded by Conrad von Bibra	Prince-Bishop of Würzburg; 1544–1558	Succeeded by Friedrich von Wirsberg
