= Peter the Elder =

Peter the Elder may refer to:

- Peter of Capua the Elder (?–1214), Italian scholastic theologian and prelate
- Peter Dell the Elder (1490–1552), German sculptor
- Peter Vischer the Elder (c. 1455–1529), German sculptor
- Peter Schenk the Elder (1660–1711), German engraver and cartographer

== See also ==
- Pieter Bruegel the Elder (1525–1569), Dutch and Flemish Renaissance painter
