= Conrad von Bibra =

Father Conrad III von Bibra
- Prince-Bishop-Elect of Würzburg
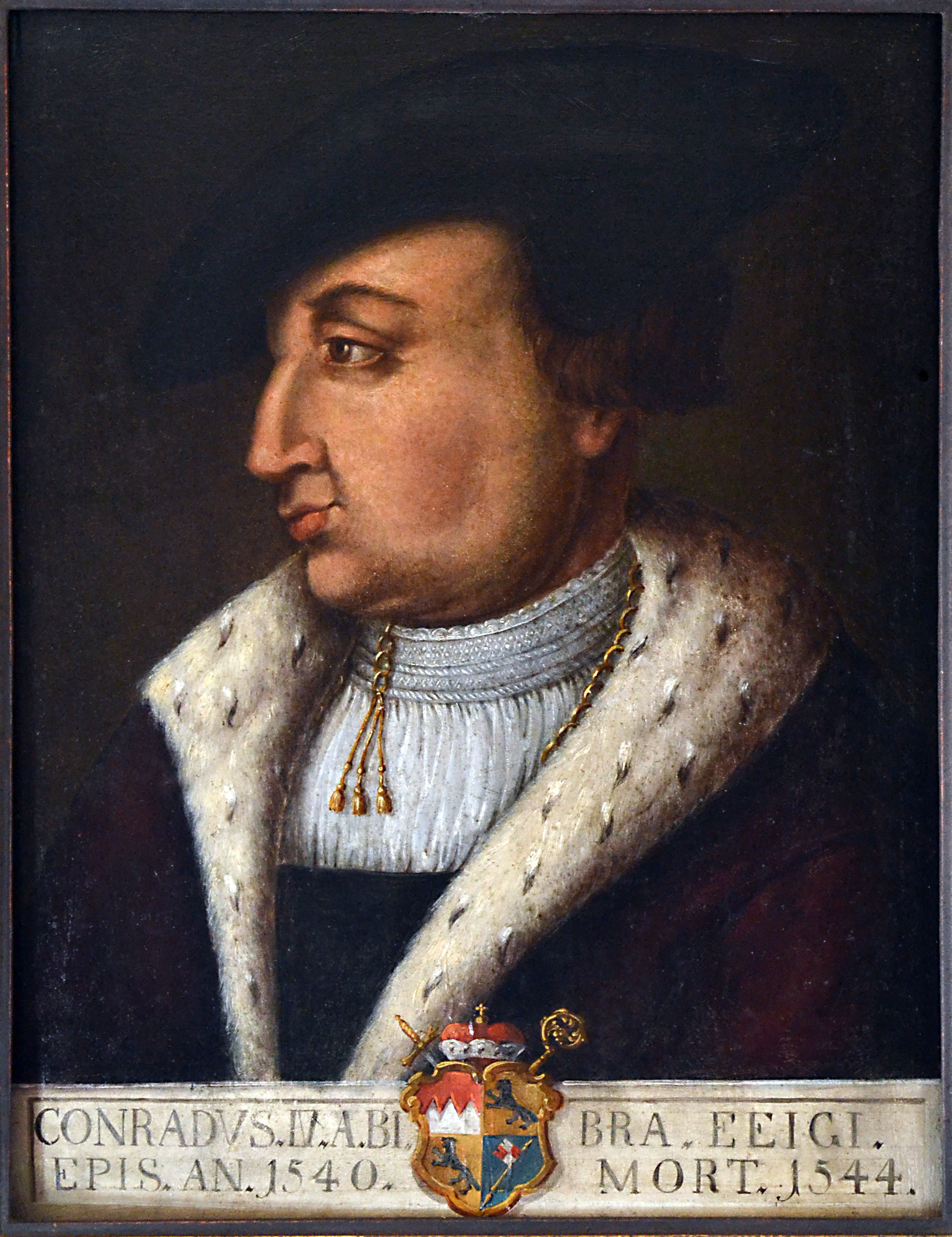
- Painting of Conrad von Bibra
- Native name: Konrad III. von Bibra
- See: Würzburg
- Appointed: 1 July 1540
- Term ended: 4 August 1544
- Predecessor: Koenrad von Thüngen
- Successor: Melchior Zobel von Giebelstadt

Personal details
- Born: c. 1490
- Died: 4 August 1544 (aged 53–54)
- Denomination: Roman Catholic

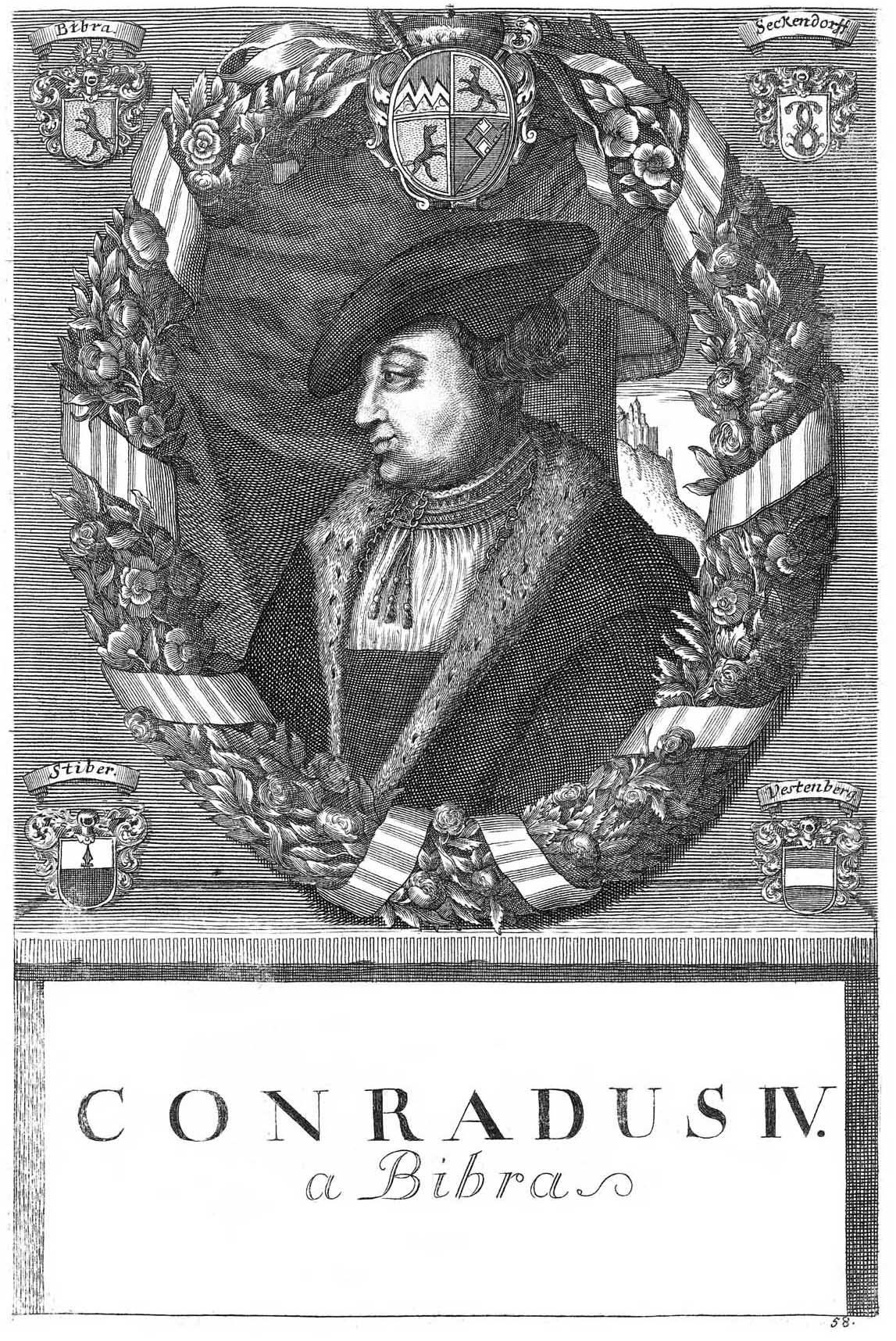
Image by Johann Salver

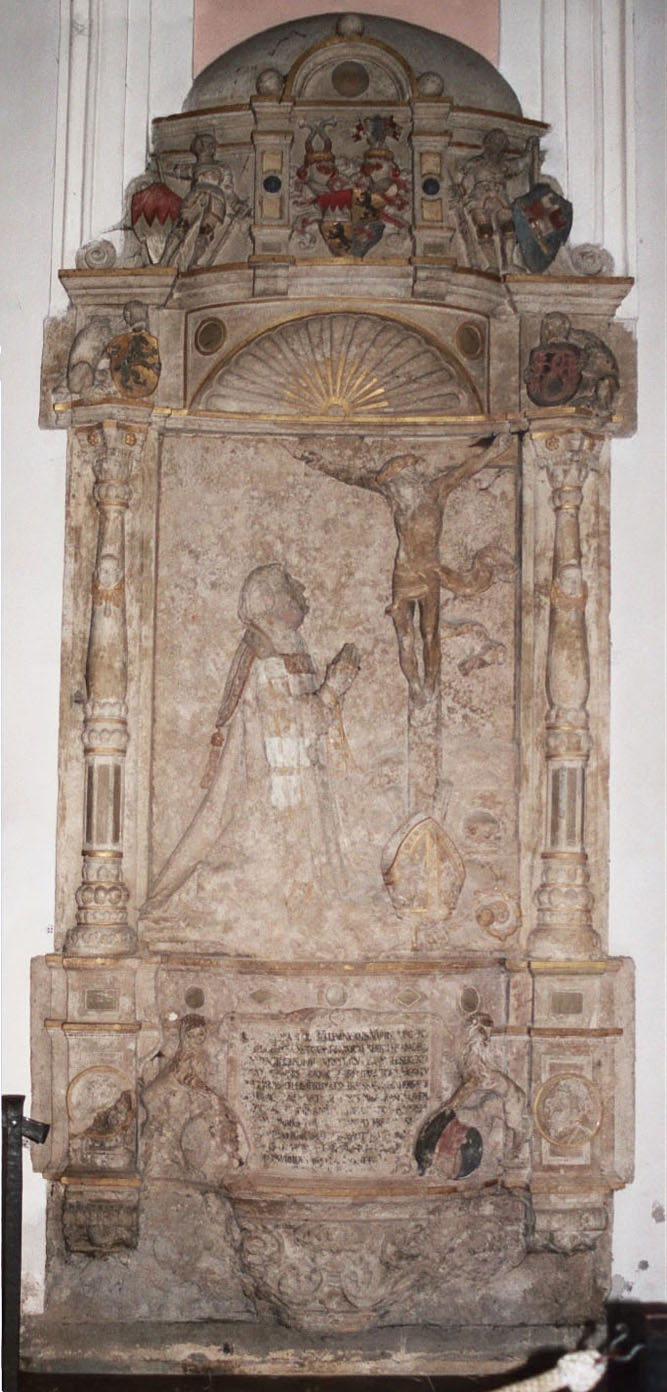
Conrad von Bibra grave

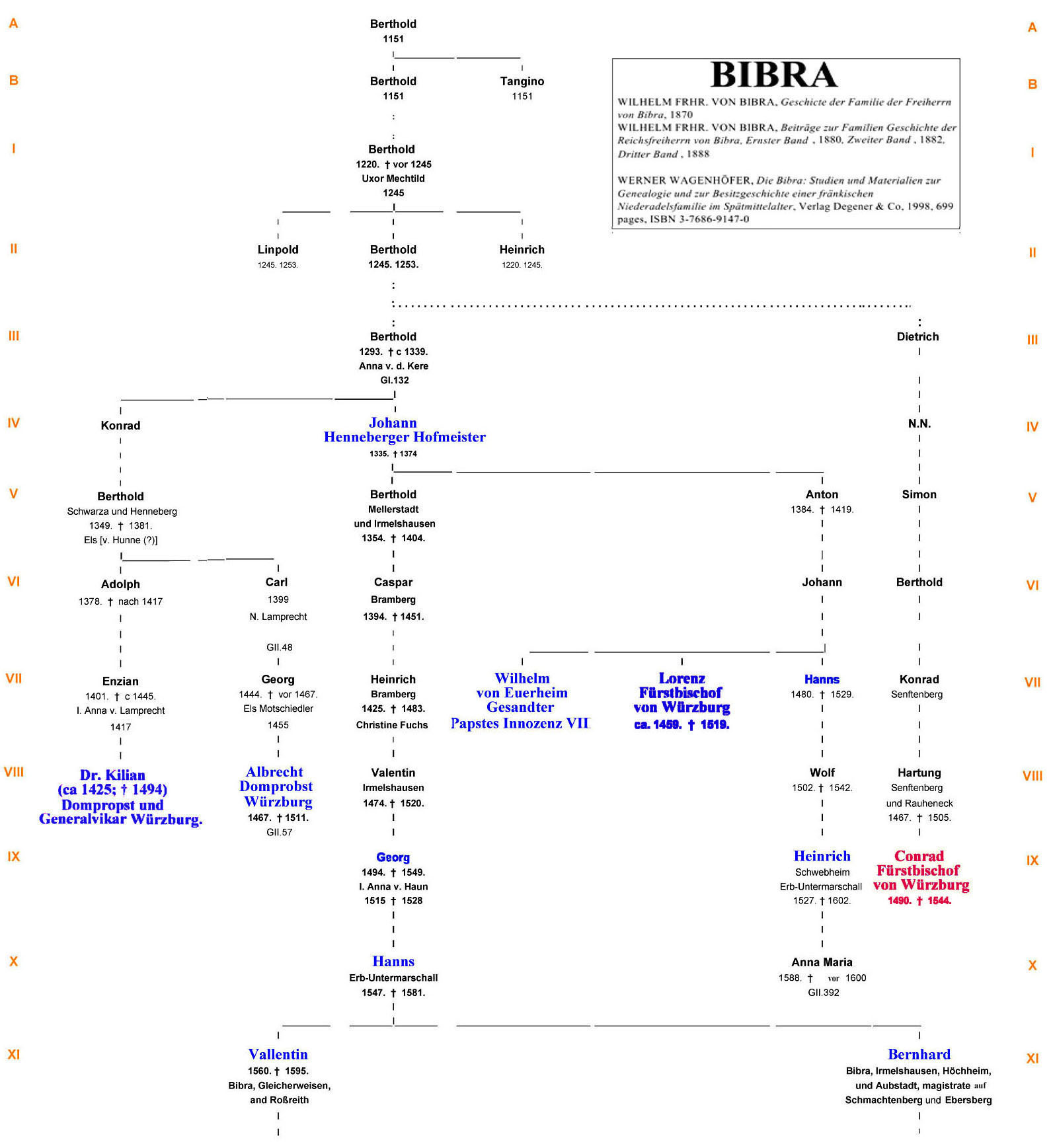
Diagram showing Conrad's family connections

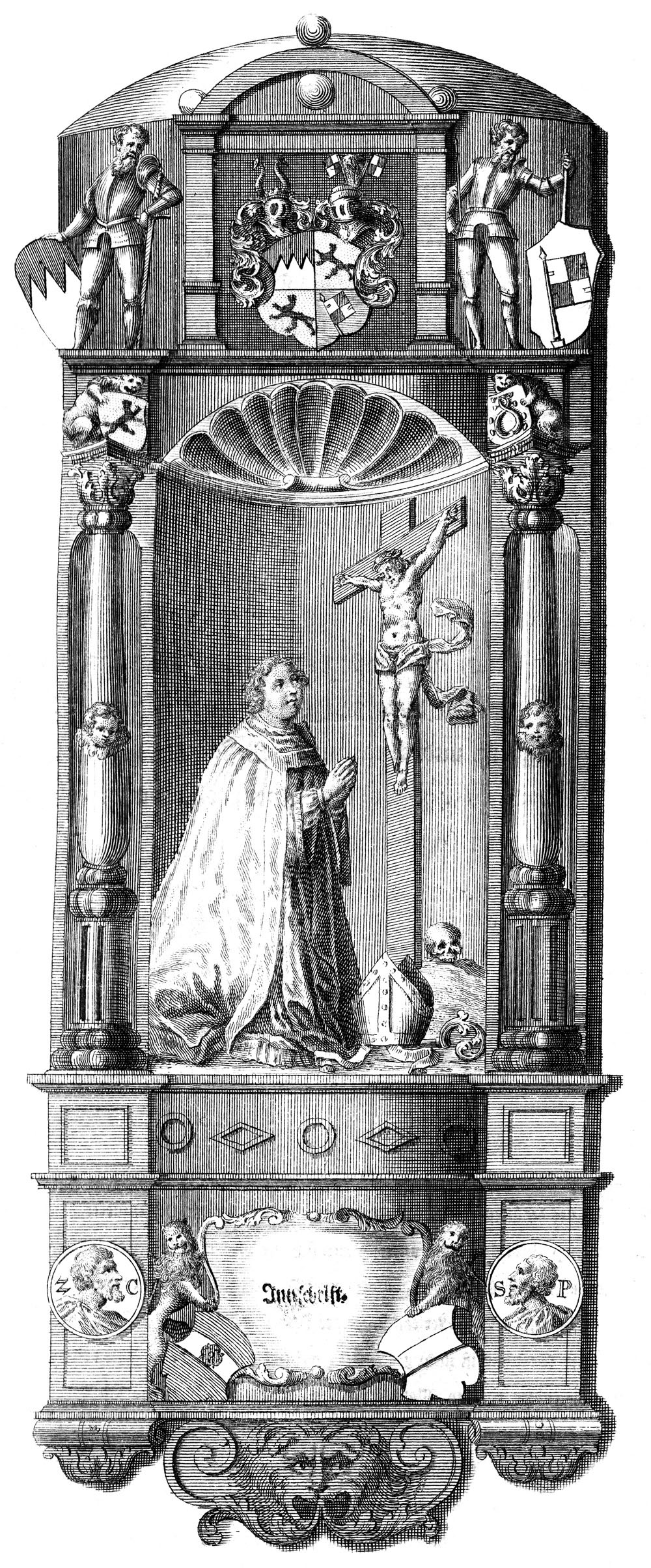
by Johann Octavian Salver

Conrad von Bibra (or Konrad III von Bibra), Duke in Franconia (1490–1544) was Prince-Bishop of Würzburg from 1540 to 1544.

Born in 1490, he studied at the universities of Cologne, Bologna, Erfurt and Ingolstadt. His whole life Conrad seemed to have had a hard time making up his mind about being a priest. Three times between 1520 and 1532 he entered a priestly position and then resigned. In 1525 during the German Peasants' War, Conrad was among the defenders of the Fortress Marienberg at Würzburg which was under siege. Afterwards he served on the commission determining damages. Finally in February 1539 he entered a priestly position again. On 28 April 1540 he became Provost of Neu Münster in Würzburg. Already on 1 July 1540, he was surprisingly elected Prince Bishop. Afterwards he showed an independent even uncooperative attitude. Seven times he put off his ordination as a priest and bishop. Also despite the Emperor's admonitions, he gave excuses and refused to personally attend meetings of the Imperial Diet.

In 1542 when the plague broke out in Würzburg, he moved his court to Aschach and Neustadt. In August 1544 after reigning only four years he died which apparently solved the problem of his never having completed his ordination vows or formal installation as bishop.

Conrad is also known for the Bishopric of Würzburg exchanging Meiningen in 1542 to the House of Henneberg in exchange for the administrative district (Amt) of Mainberg.

== Grumbach-Zobel Affair ==
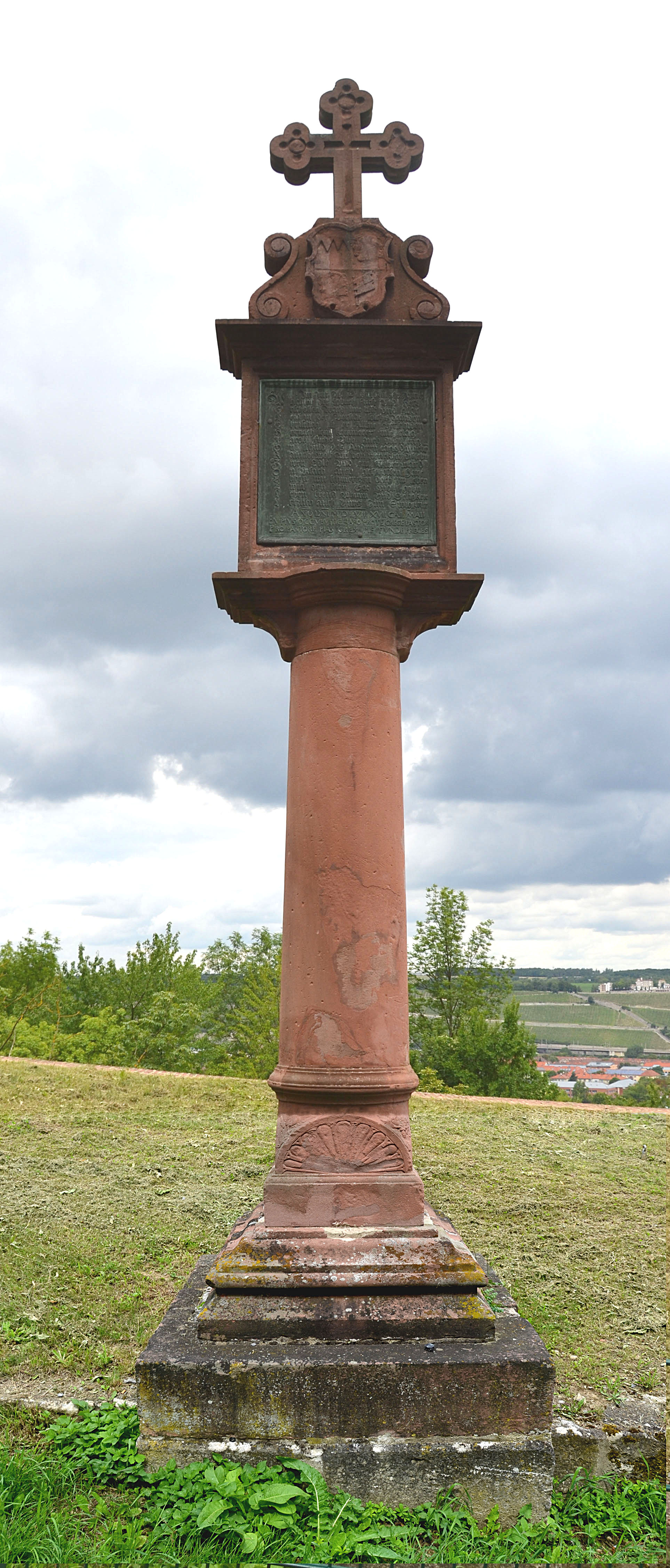
Spot where Melchior Zobel von Giebelstadt died after assassination by Grumbach's henchman Christoph Kretzen

Just before dying, Conrad gave Wilhelm von Grumbach 10,000 gold florins as a gift, without obtaining the consent of the Cathedral Chapter. When, after the death of Conrad, Melchior Zobel of Giebelstadt, the new Prince Bishop asked for the money back from Grumbach. Grumbach paid, but the harmonious relationship between lord and vassal were destroyed.

Conrad left behind two natural children named Conrad and Katherine Biber. Katherine married a Christoph Kretzen. Kretzen later murdered the next prince bishop, Meichior von Zobel (as well as Florian Geyer) on behalf of his employer Wilhelm von Grumbach. Grumbach's adventures including this incident made him famous. The spot was marked next to the All Saints Bridge in Würzburg on the fortress side. Grumbach declared he was innocent of this crime, but his story was not believed, and he fled to France. Kretzer was captured on the French border in Schaumburg Castle in what was then Lorraine, confessed to the act in 1558, but hanged himself before he could be tried.

== Family ==
Conrad was a member of the aristocratic Franconian von Bibra family which among its members were Lorenz von Bibra, Prince-Bishop of Würzburg, Duke in Franconia (1459–1519), Lorenz’ half brother, Wilhelm von Bibra Papal emissary, Heinrich von Bibra, Prince-Bishop, Prince-Abbot of Fulda (1711–1788) and Ernst von Bibra (*1806; † 1878), naturalist and author.

== Grave ==
The main part of his body was buried at the Würzburg Cathedral (see diagram below). His tomb monument (#32) by Peter Dell the Elder and the bronze plate (#37) are both on display. The bronze plate was apparently damaged in World War II. Photo of undamaged bronze plate is linked.

Catholic Church titles
Preceded by Konrad von Thüngen	Prince-Bishop of Würzburg; 1540–1544	Succeeded by Melchior Zobel von Giebelstadt
