= Julius Echter von Mespelbrunn =

German bishop (1545–1617)

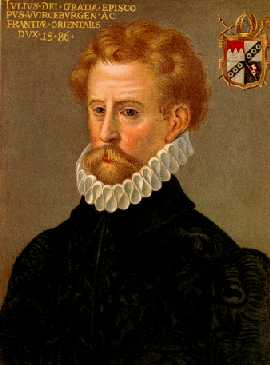
Painting from 1586

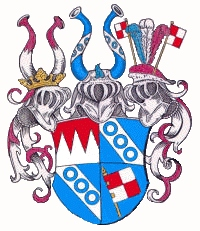
Coat of arms

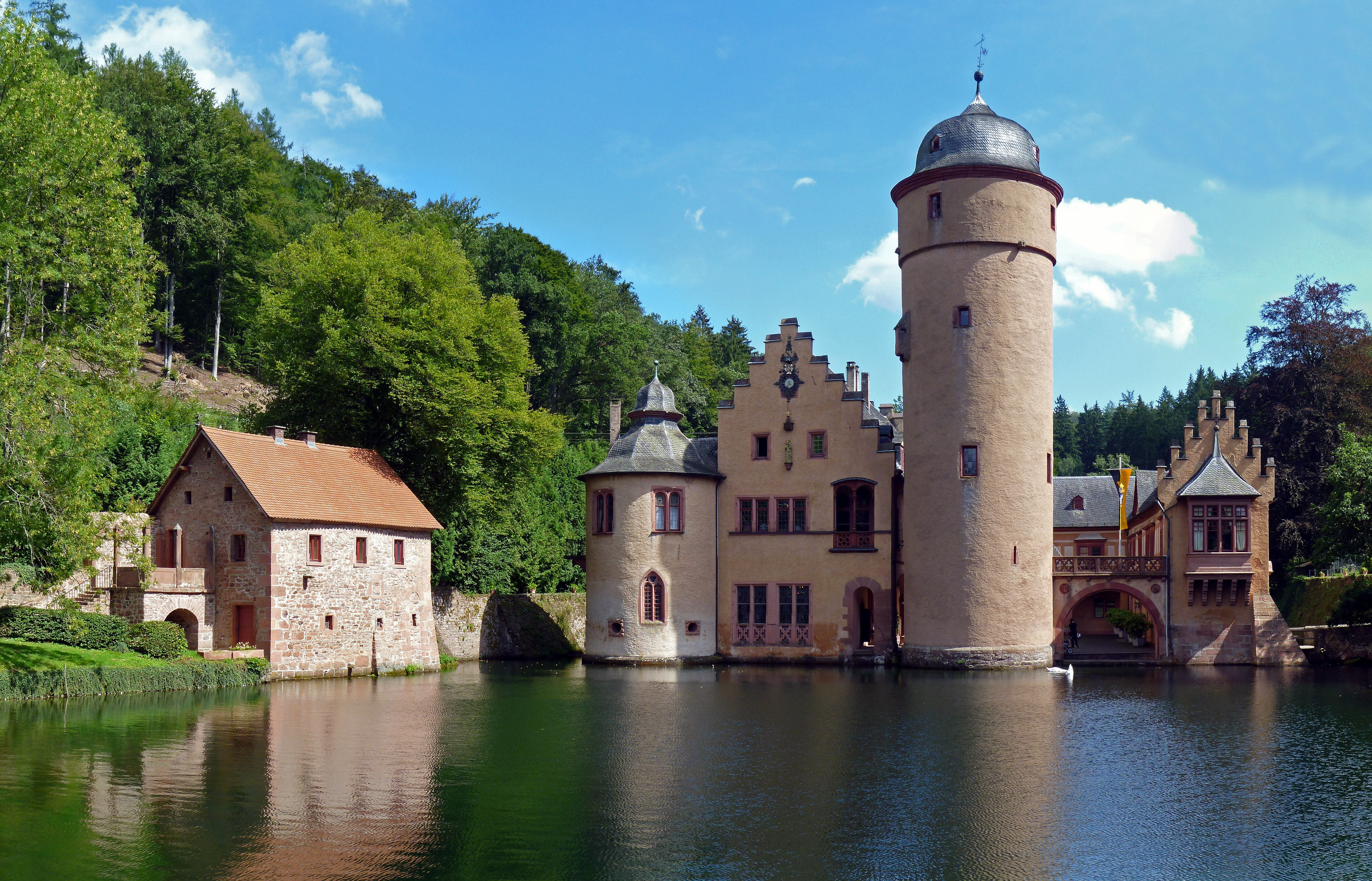
Schloss Mespelbrunn

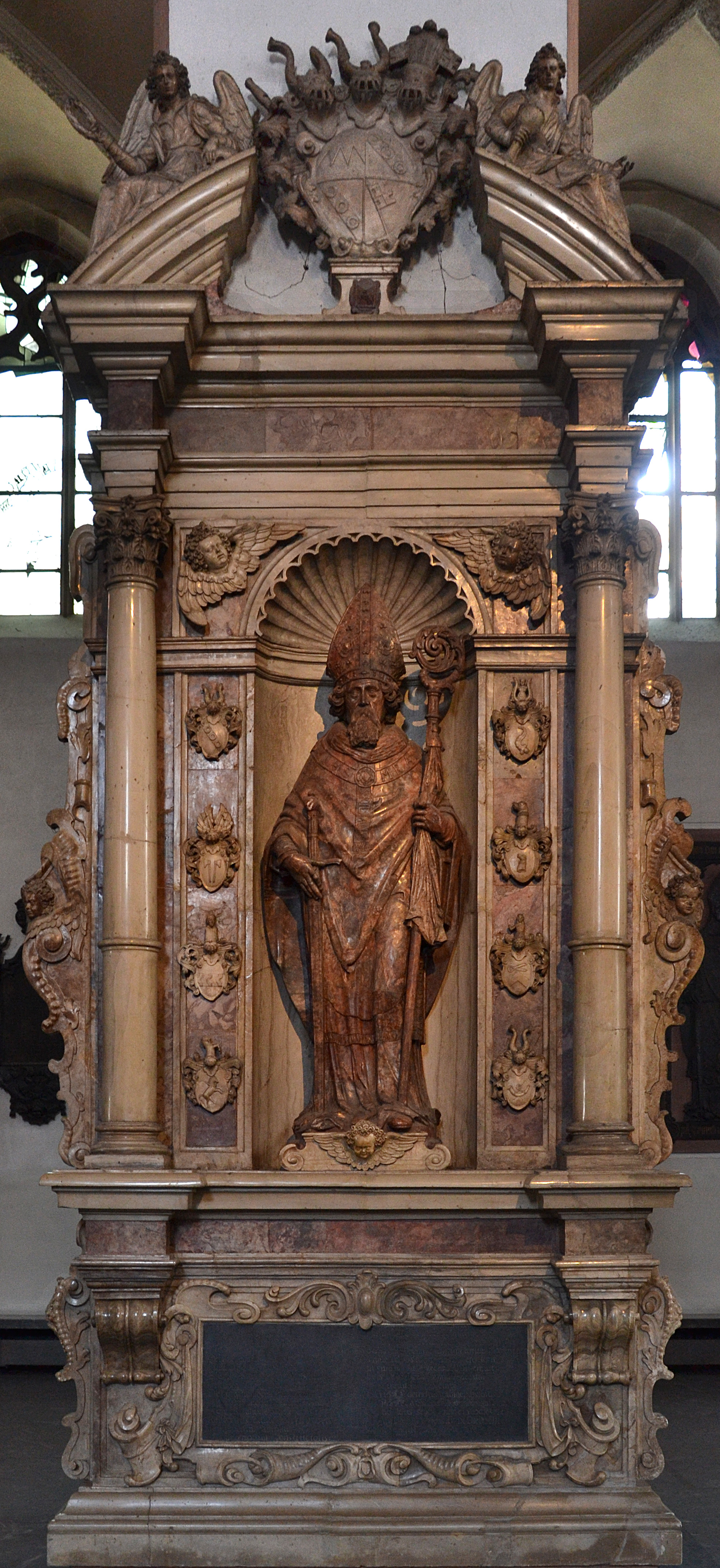
Julius Echter von Mespelbrunn's grave at Würzburg Cathedral

Julius Echter von Mespelbrunn (18 March 1545 – 9 September 1617) was Prince-Bishop of Würzburg from 1573. He was born in Mespelbrunn Castle, Spessart (Lower Franconia) and died in Würzburg.

== Life ==
Mespelbrunn was born the second son of diplomat Peter III Echter. He was educated in Mainz, Leuven, Douai, Paris, Angers, Pavia, and Rome.

In Rome, he became a licentiate of canon and civil law. In 1567 he entered on his duties as canon of Würzburg, an office to which he had been appointed in 1554; in 1570 he became the dean of the cathedral chapter, and in 1573, at the age of twenty-eight, even before his ordination to the priesthood, was appointed to the office of the Prince-Bishop of Würzburg. During the first ten years of Echter's government, he attempted to unite the Abbey of Fulda and the Bishopric of Würzburg, after Prince-Abbot Balthasar von Dernbach was deposed. Von Dernbach's attempts at re-Catholicisation of Fulda alienated the Fulda chapter, the Hessian gentry, and the Lutheran knights. They joined forces with Echter von Mespelbrunn. This alliance forced von Dernbach to abdicate at Hammelburg in 1576. Echter was installed as administrator, but only on the condition that he tolerate the knights’ Lutheran faith. However, Echter had no intention of honoring this condition in Würzburg. From the beginning, he carried out a thorough ecclesiastical restoration. To this end, he promoted the Jesuits and their ministry. Echter re-founded the University of Würzburg which was opened 2 January 1582. It became a model for all similar Counter-Reformation institutions. Under the Jesuits it flourished, grew rapidly, and furnished the see with the priests and officials needed to prosecute the Counter-Reformation. He also founded a seminary in 1589.

Echter took decisive steps against Protestants. He banished all Lutheran preachers from his territory and removed all priests who were unwilling to observe the rules of their office. Public officials had to be Catholics, and none but Catholic teachers could be appointed. He began, moreover, courses of careful instruction for non-Catholics, and to some extent threatened them with penalties and/or banishment. Within three years about 100,000 reportedly returned to the Catholic Church. Julius Echter von Mespelbrunn died on 9 September 1617, aged 72, at Marienberg Fortress.

== Burial ==
The main part of his body was buried at the Würzburg Cathedral. Julius Echter von Mespelbrunn broke with the tradition of heart burial at Ebrach Abbey and had his heart buried in the Neubaukirche, which he had had built. After the Neubaukirche was destroyed in World War II, the heart had to be temporarily transferred. To mark the 400-year anniversary of the re-founding of the university, the heart was brought back to the rebuilt Renaissance church and placed within a heart monument weighing two tons. The church had been secularized and turned into the great hall of the university.

== Legacy ==
He is also identified by Dillinger (2009) as one of the "spearheads of Tridentine reform in Germany. For them, the fight against witches was clearly part of an apocalyptic battle against evil and for the purity of the church".

His most lasting monument, after the University of Würzburg, is the Julius Hospital (Juliusspital) in that town, which he founded with the endowment of the abandoned monastery of Heiligenthal. By skillful administration he improved the economic conditions, reduced taxes and improved the administration of justice. He proved himself one of the most capable rulers of his time as "founder and soul of the Catholic League".

Echter built or renovated around 300 churches as well as constructing numerous rectories and school buildings in his territory.

Würzburger Hofbräu makes a wheat beer called Julius Echter Hefe-Weissbier in honor of the bishop.

St John's College, Cambridge holds 20 volumes which previously belonged to him; these were taken from Mespelbrunn's library during the Thirty Years War.

Catholic Church titles
Preceded by Friedrich von Wirsberg	Prince-Bishop of Würzburg; 1573–1617	Succeeded by Johann Gottfried von Aschhausen
