= Wilhelm von Grumbach =

German adventurer (1503–1567)

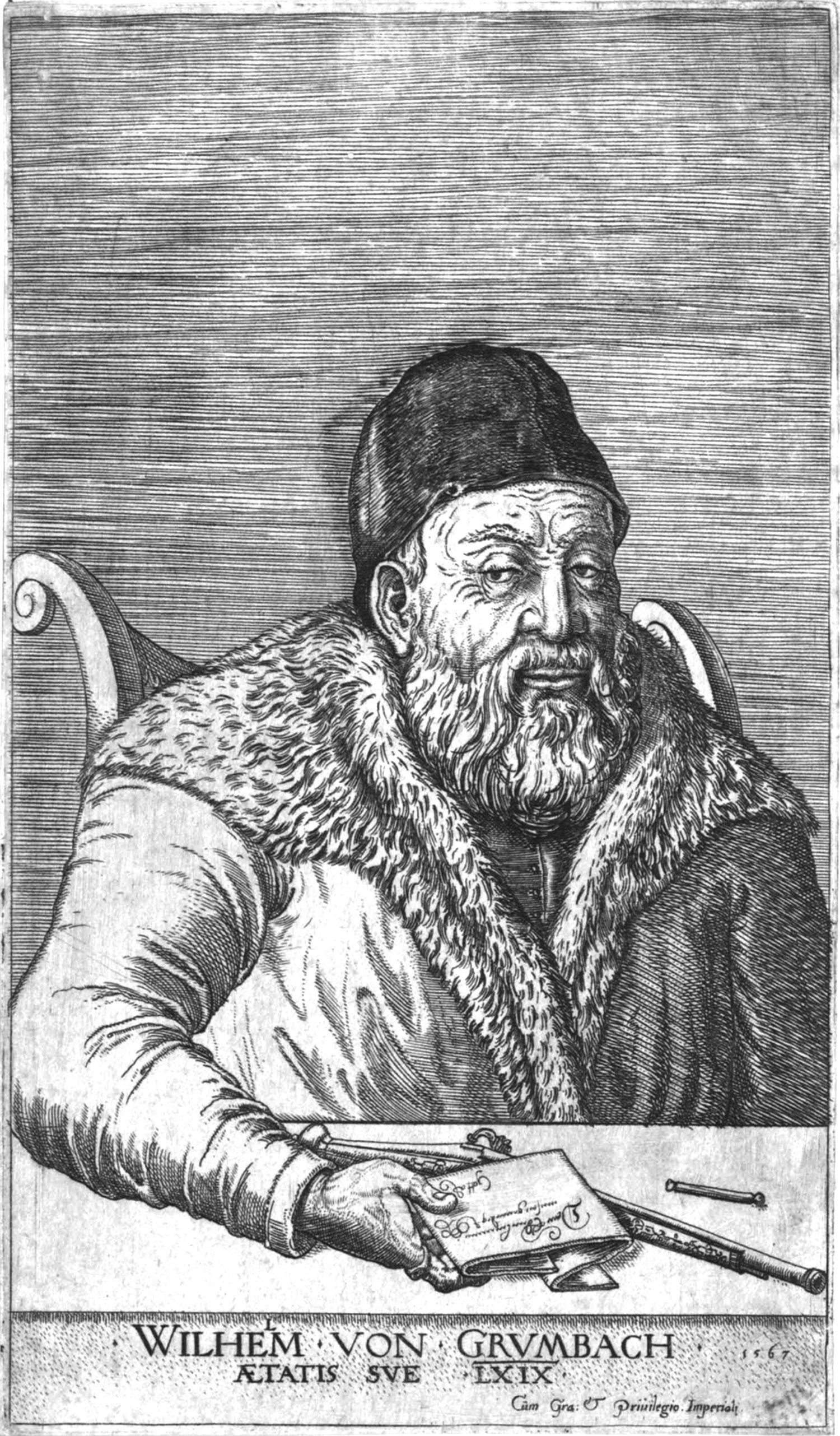
Wilhelm von Grumbach

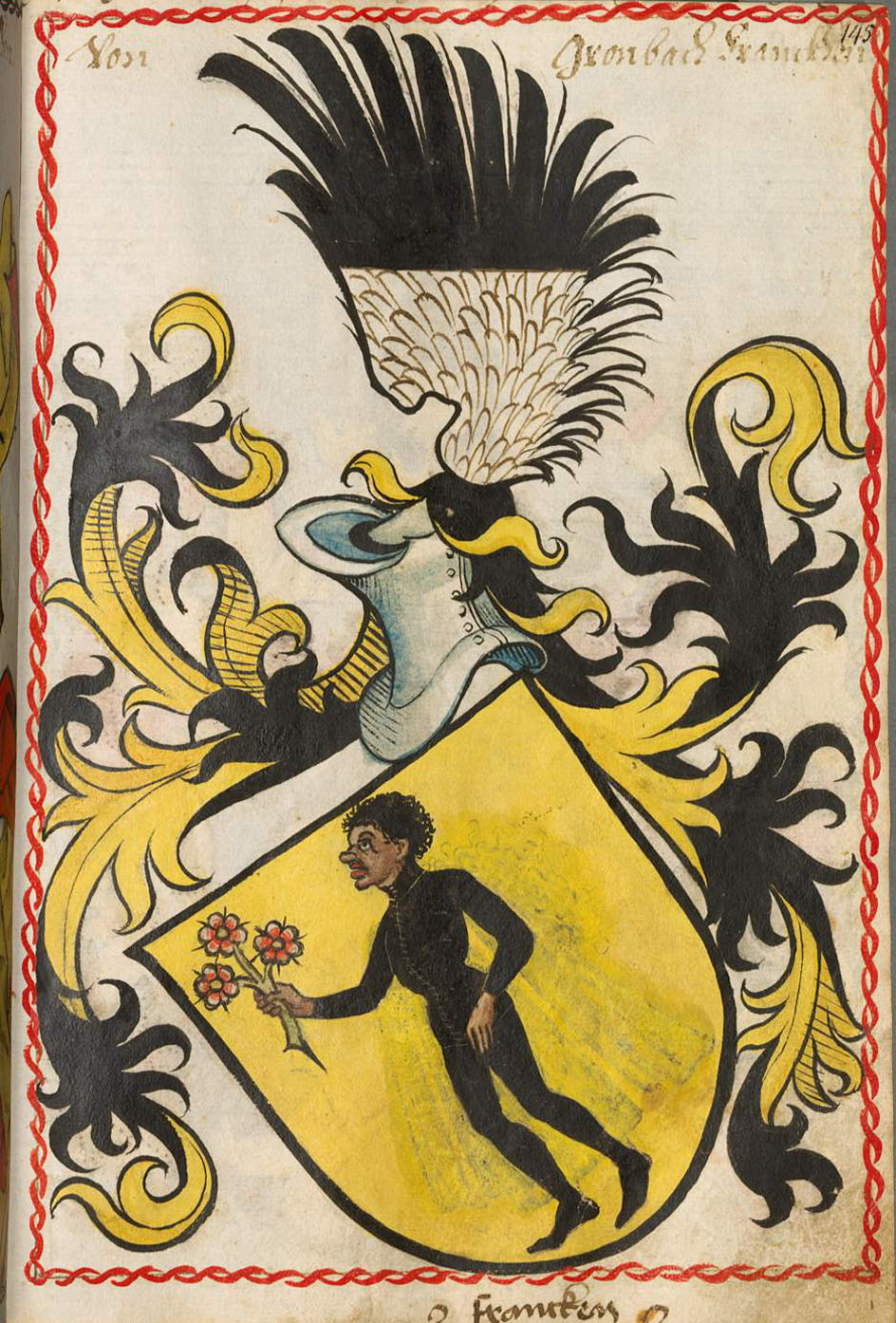
Coat of arms of the von Grumbach noble family, Scheiblersches Wappenbuch, 1450–1480

Wilhelm von Grumbach (1 June 1503 – 18 April 1567) was a German adventurer, chiefly known through his connection with the so-called "Grumbach Feud" (German: Grumbachsche Händel), the last attempt of the Imperial Knights to prevail against the power of the territorial Princes of the Holy Roman Empire.

== Florian Geyer ==
A member of the old Franconian noble family von Grumbach (a branch of the Wolfskeel Uradel family), Wilhelm was born in Rimpar near Würzburg, and having passed some time at the court of the Hohenzollern margrave Casimir of Bayreuth, fought alongside the princes during the German Peasants' War in 1524 and 1525.

In the aftermath of the Battle of Frankenhausen, peasant leader Florian Geyer was one of the last survivors of Thomas Müntzer's army. On 9 June 1525, he was contacted in Würzburg by two servants of his brother-in-law Wilhelm von Grumbach (reportedly including Christoph Kretzen of the Grumbach-Zobel affair below), who had the stated intention of helping him rekindle the rebellion. While travelling together, they stabbed Geyer to death in the Gramschatz Forest near Grumbach's hometown.

== Grumbach-Zobel Affair ==
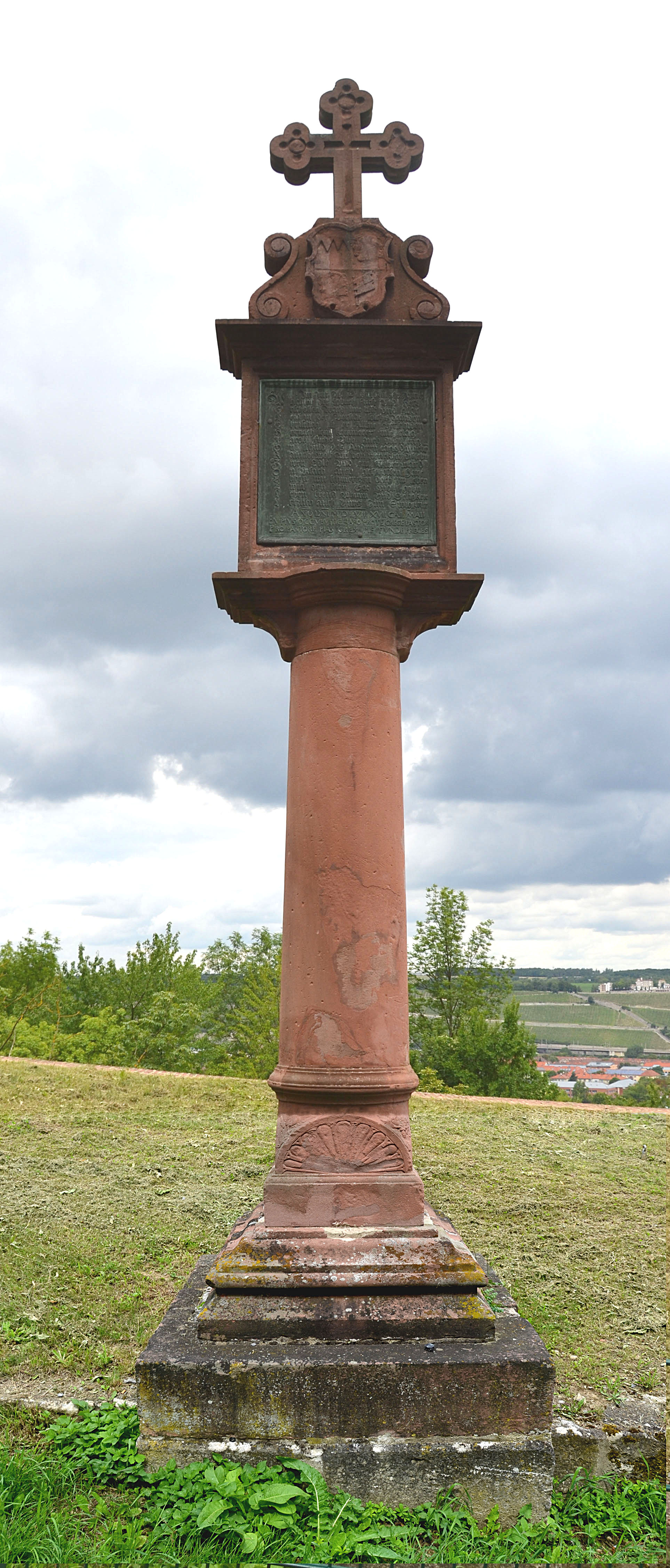
Spot where Melchior Zobel von Giebelstadt died after assassination by Grumbach's henchman Christoph Kretzen

Around 1540, Grumbach became associated with Margrave Casimir's son, the turbulent Albert Alcibiades of Bayreuth, whom he served both in peace and war. As a landholder, Grumbach was a vassal of the Würzburg Bishops and had held office at the court of Conrad von Bibra, who was elected Prince-Bishop in 1540. Just before his death in 1544, Conrad gave Grumbach 10,000 gold florins as a gift, without obtaining the consent of the cathedral chapter. When the new Prince-Bishop Melchior Zobel von Giebelstadt asked for the money back from Grumbach, he paid, but the harmonious relationship between lord and vassal were destroyed. Unable to free himself and his associates from the suzerainty of the bishop by appealing to the imperial courts he decided to adopt more violent measures, and his friendship with Margrave Albert was very serviceable in this connection.

After the conclusion of the Peace of Passau in 1552, Grumbach assisted Albert in his career of plunder in Franconia during the Second Margrave War and was thus able to take some revenge upon his enemy, Melchior Zobel. Albert's career, however, was checked by his defeat at the Battle of Sievershausen in July 1553 and his subsequent flight to France, while the Würzburg bishop took advantage of this state of affairs to seize Grumbach's lands. The knight obtained an order of restitution from the Imperial Chamber Court (Reichskammergericht), but he was unable to carry this into effect.

In 1558, Zobel (like Florian Geyer earlier) was seized and killed by Grumbach's henchman Christoph Kretzen who was married to Katherine Biber, Zobel's predecessor Conrad von Bibra's natural daughter. Grumbach declared he was innocent of this crime, but his story was not believed, and he fled to France. Kretzen was captured on the French border in Schaumburg Castle in what was then Lorraine, confessed to the act in 1558, but hanged himself before he could be tried.

== Grumbach Feud ==
Returning to the Holy Roman Empire, he pleaded his cause in person before the Reichstag at Augsburg in 1559, but without success. Meanwhile, he had found a new patron in the Wettin duke John Frederick II of Saxony, whose father, John Frederick I, had been obliged by the 1547 Capitulation of Wittenberg to surrender the electoral dignity to the Albertine cadet branch of his family. Chafing under this deprivation the duke listened readily to Grumbach's plans for recovering the lost dignity, including a general rising of the German knights and the deposition of Frederick II of Denmark. Magical charms were employed against the duke's enemies, and communications from angels were invented which helped to stir up the zeal of the people.

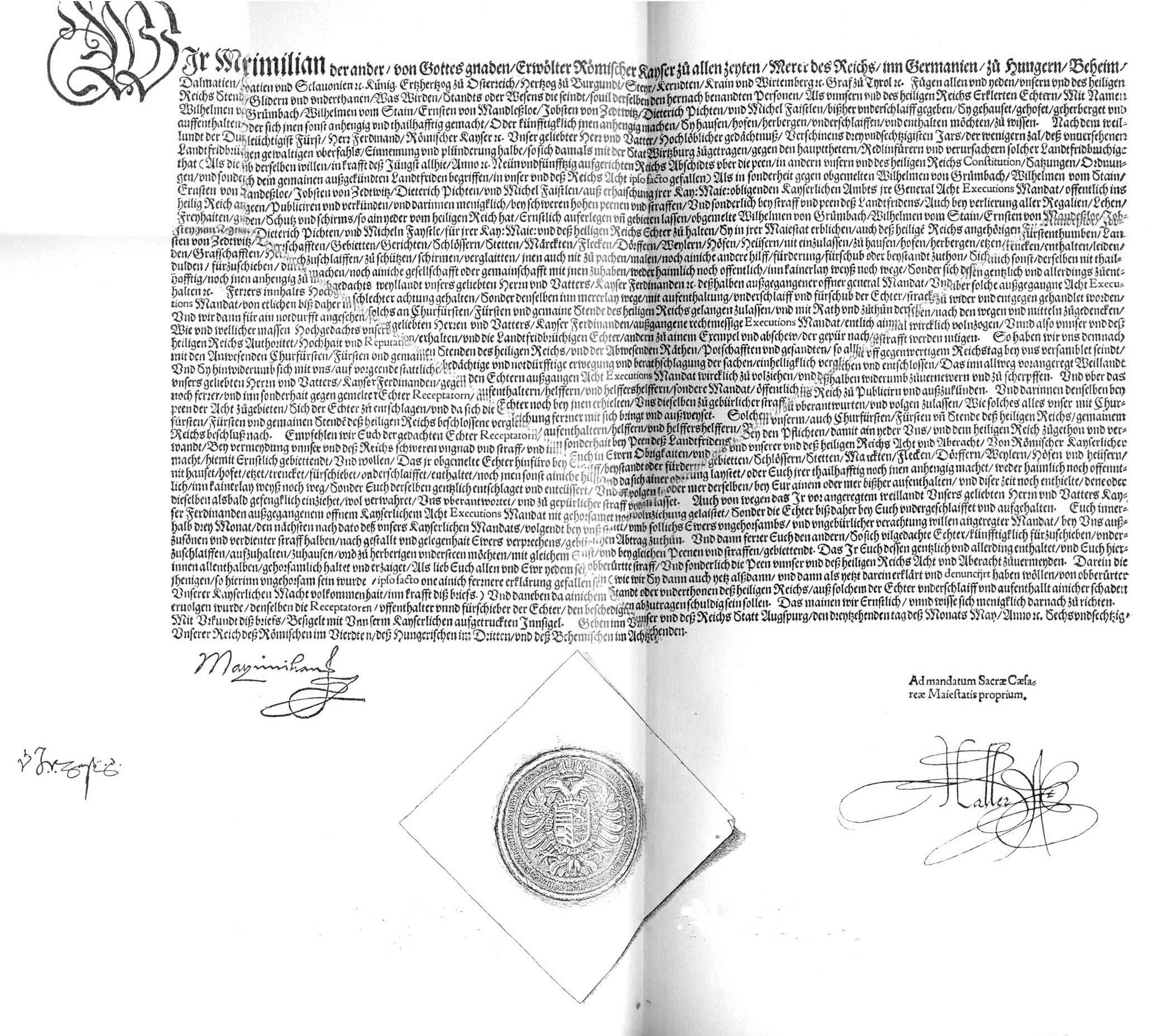
Imperial ban by Emperor Maximilian II against Wilhelm von Grumbach, 13 May 1566

In 1563 Grumbach attacked Würzburg, seized and plundered the city, and compelled the chapter and the bishop to restore his lands. He was consequently placed under the imperial ban, but John Frederick II refused to obey the order of Emperor Maximilian II to withdraw his protection from him. Grumbach gained time, as Maximilian adjourned the case to the next Reichstag to be held in 1566 at Augsburg; meanwhile he sought to compass the assassination of John Frederick's rival, Elector Augustus of Saxony. Proclamations were issued calling for assistance, and alliances both without and within the Empire were concluded.

Nevertheless, at the Augsburg diet in March 1566 even the Lutheran estates of the former Schmalkaldic League as well as his younger brother John William let John Frederick II down. He was placed under the ban while the ban against Grumbach was renewed and signed by Emperor Maximilian II on May 13. Elector Augustus, prime mover in the condemnation of his cousin, marched against John Frederick's residence at Gotha. Assistance was not forthcoming, and a mutiny instigated by Augustus led to the capitulation of the town. Grumbach and his confederates were delivered to their foes and had to face trial for their misdeeds. Grumbach, after being tortured, was executed by dismemberment at Gotha on 18 April 1567.

John Frederick II's castle was razed, he was deposed by his brother John William and spent the rest of his life in prison at Dresden, Wiener Neustadt and Lamberg Castle in Steyr, where he died on 19 May 1595.

== Sources ==
- (in German) Friedrich Ortloff: Die Geschichte der Grumbachschen Händel [The History of the Grumbach Feud], 4 Volumes (Jena: Verlag Frommann, 1869 and 1870)
- (in German) Johannes Voigt, "Wilhelm von Grumbach und seine Händel [William von Grumbach and his Feud]", in: Friedrich von Raumer, ed., Historisches Taschenbuch: Neue Folge, Achter Jahrgang [Historical Paperback: New Series, 8th Volume] (Leipzig: F. A. Brockhaus, 1847), pages 77-254
- (in German) Franz Xaver von Wegele, "Wilhelm von Grumbach", in: Heinrich von Sybel, ed., Historische Zeitschrift [Historical Magazine, the periodical of the Königlich Bayerischen Akademie der Wissenschaften (Royal Bavaria Academy of Knowledge)], Zweiter Band [Volume 2] (Munich: J[ohann]. G[eorg]. Cotta'schen Buchhandlung, 1859), pages 408–422
- Christoph Werner: Wilhelm von Grumbach, Reichsritter und Landfriedensbrecher. In: Mitteldeutsches Jahrbuch für Kultur und Geschichte, Band 24/2017
