= Peter Dell the Elder =

German sculptor

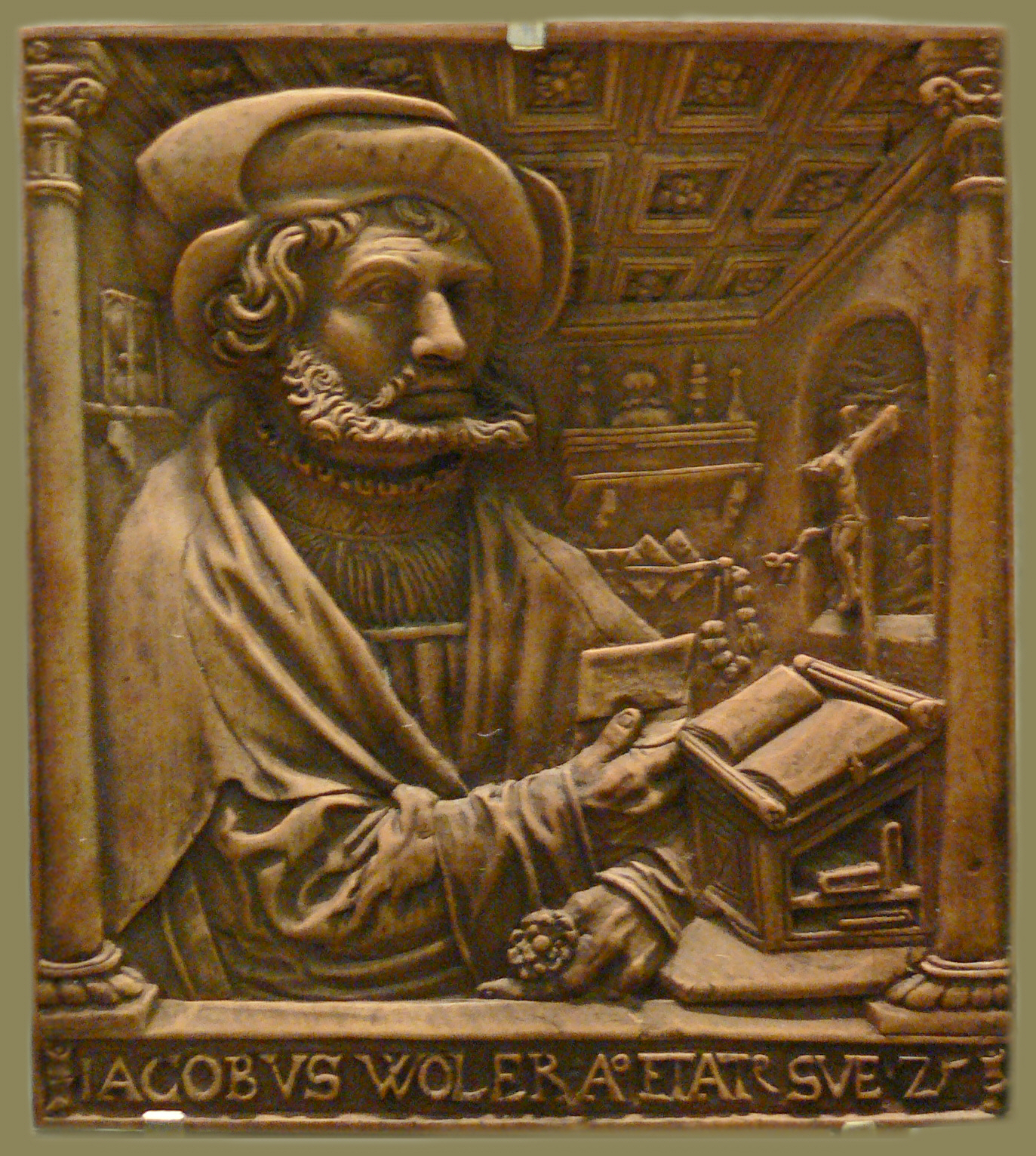
Peter Dell the Elder, Portrait of Jakob Woler, 1529

Peter Dell the Elder, or Peter Dell der Ältere, (1490–1552), was a German sculptor.

Dell was born in Würzburg, and is father to another sculptor Peter Dell the Younger. He specialized in religious and portrait sculptures working with limewood and pearwood. Dell also did a number of church monuments out of stone. He died in Würzburg in 1552.
