= Konrad von Thüngen =

Prince-Bishop of Wurzburg

- Prince-Bishop of Würzburg
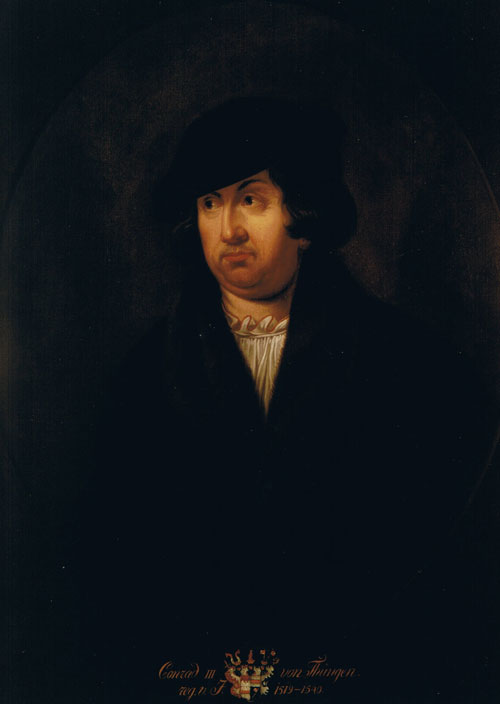
- Konrad von Thüngen
- See: Würzburg
- Elected: 15 February 1519
- Term ended: 16 June 1540
- Predecessor: Lorenz von Bibra
- Successor: Conrad von Bibra

Personal details
- Born: c. 1466
- Died: 16 June 1540 (aged 73–74) Fortress Marienberg, Würzburg
- Denomination: Roman Catholic

Konrad von Thüngen (c. 1466 – 16 June 1540) was the Prince-Bishop of Würzburg from 1519 until his death in 1540.

== Biography ==
Family arms of Konrad von Thüngen

Konrad was born into a Franconian noble family about 1466. He was appointed Prince-Bishop of Würzburg on 15 February 1519, with Pope Leo X confirming his appointment on 13 April 1519.

In 1525, the [Prince-Bishopric of Würzburg was one of the main centers of the German Peasants' War, during which peasants, discontent with high taxes and forced labor requirements, rose en masse. The peasants found leaders in men like Götz von Berlichingen and Florian Geyer. During the course of the war, Würzburg was besieged by peasant armies and Konrad was forced to flee. The peasants were eventually repelled by the forces of the Swabian League, and Konrad returned to the prince-bishopric along with the forces of Louis V, Elector Palatine. Those who had participated in the revolt were punished harshly.

Konrad died in Fortress Marienberg in Würzburg on 16 June 1540.

Catholic Church titles
Preceded by Lorenz von Bibra	Prince-Bishop of Würzburg; 1519–1540	Succeeded by Conrad von Bibra
