= Allegory of the Planets and Continents =

Painting by Giovanni Battista Tiepolo

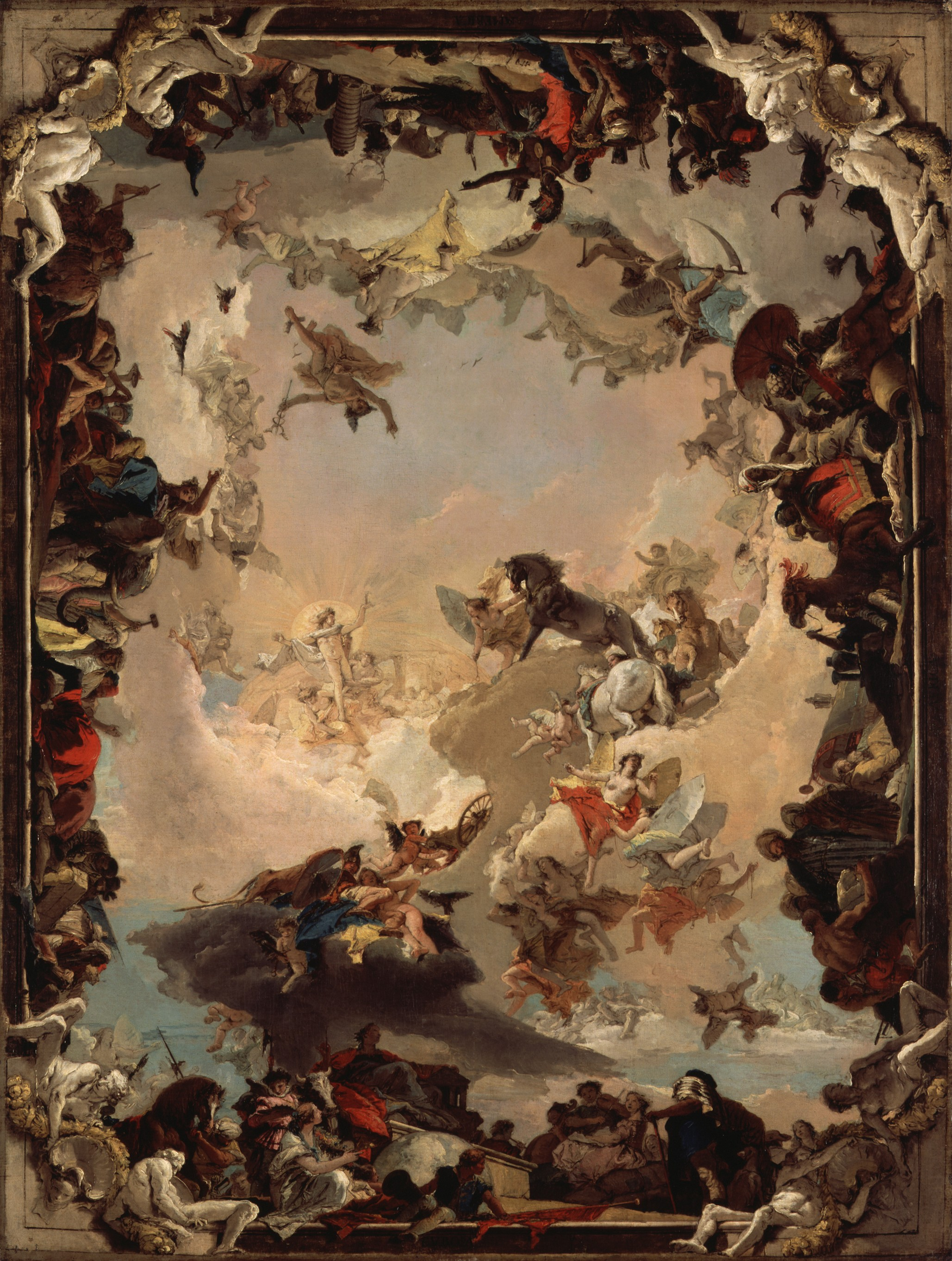
- Artist: Giovanni Battista Tiepolo
- Year: 1752
- Medium: Oil on canvas
- Dimensions: 185.4 cm × 139.4 cm (73.0 in × 54.9 in)
- Location: Metropolitan Museum of Art; New York

Allegory of the Planets and Continents is a 1752 painting (or detailed sketch) by Italian artist Giovanni Battista Tiepolo. Done in oil on canvas, the allegorical work uses human figures to represent members of the Greco-Roman pantheon, the planets, and four continents. The painting is an elaborate oil sketch made by Tiepolo in preparation for rendering a similar, larger version of the scene as a massive fresco. Between December 1750 and November 1753, Tiepolo was commissioned to decorate the Prince-Bishop of Würzburg Karl Philipp von Greifenclau zu Vollraths newly constructed palace on the ceiling of a staircase. He created a massive fresco of over 600 m^{2} (6,500 sq ft), considered the largest fresco in the world and is often thought to be his greatest achievement. The intricate painting depicts figures circling around Tiepolo's rendering of Apollo, the sun god; this represents planets orbiting the Sun. The cornice of the painting symbolize the continents Europe, America, Africa, and Asia.

It was identified in the ceiling of a corridor at the Hendon Hall Hotel, London, in 1954. How it came to be at Hendon Hall is not entirely clear: the house was once owned by the actor David Garrick although he never lived there. The painting differs from the Würzburg fresco in several ways; the fresco includes portraits of Greifenclau, Tiepolo, his two sons, and Balthasar Neumann, and the positions of the Americas and Europe are reversed. There is some divergence among critics as to whether the painting was made before or after the fresco, or whether it is by Tiepolo or his son Domenico Tiepolo.
