= Johann Peter Alexander Wagner =

German sculptor (1730-1809)

- Born: 26 February 1730; Theres, Unterfranken, Bavaria
- Died: 7 January 1809; Würzburg
- Known for: Rococo sculpture
- Style: Rococo, Classical; Rococo (later)
- Movement: Rococo
- Spouse: Maria Cordula Curé
- Children: 1
- Father: Johann Thomas Wagner
- Patrons: Adam Friedrich von Seinsheim, Prince–Bishop of Würzburg

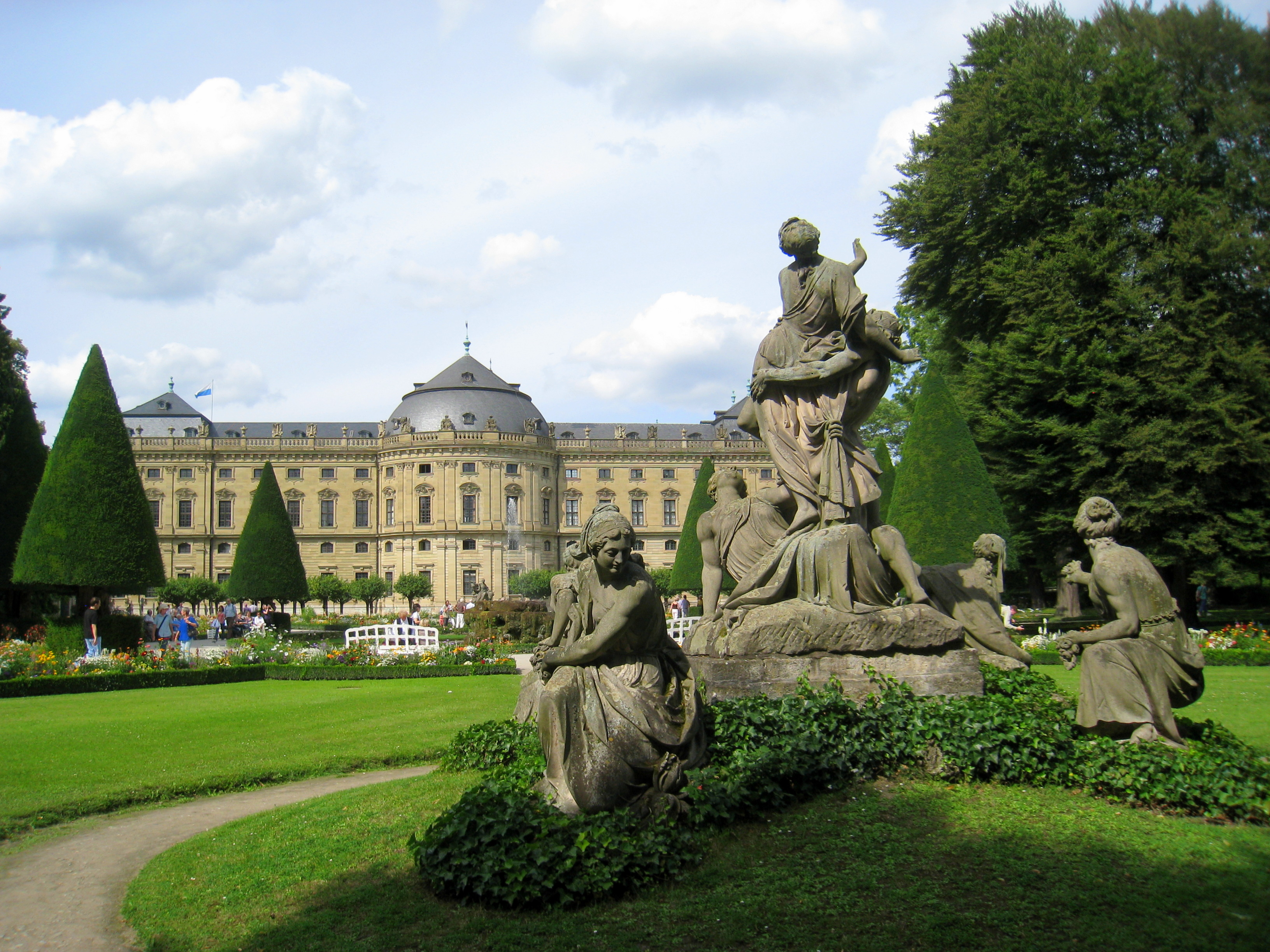
Würzburg Residence sculpture

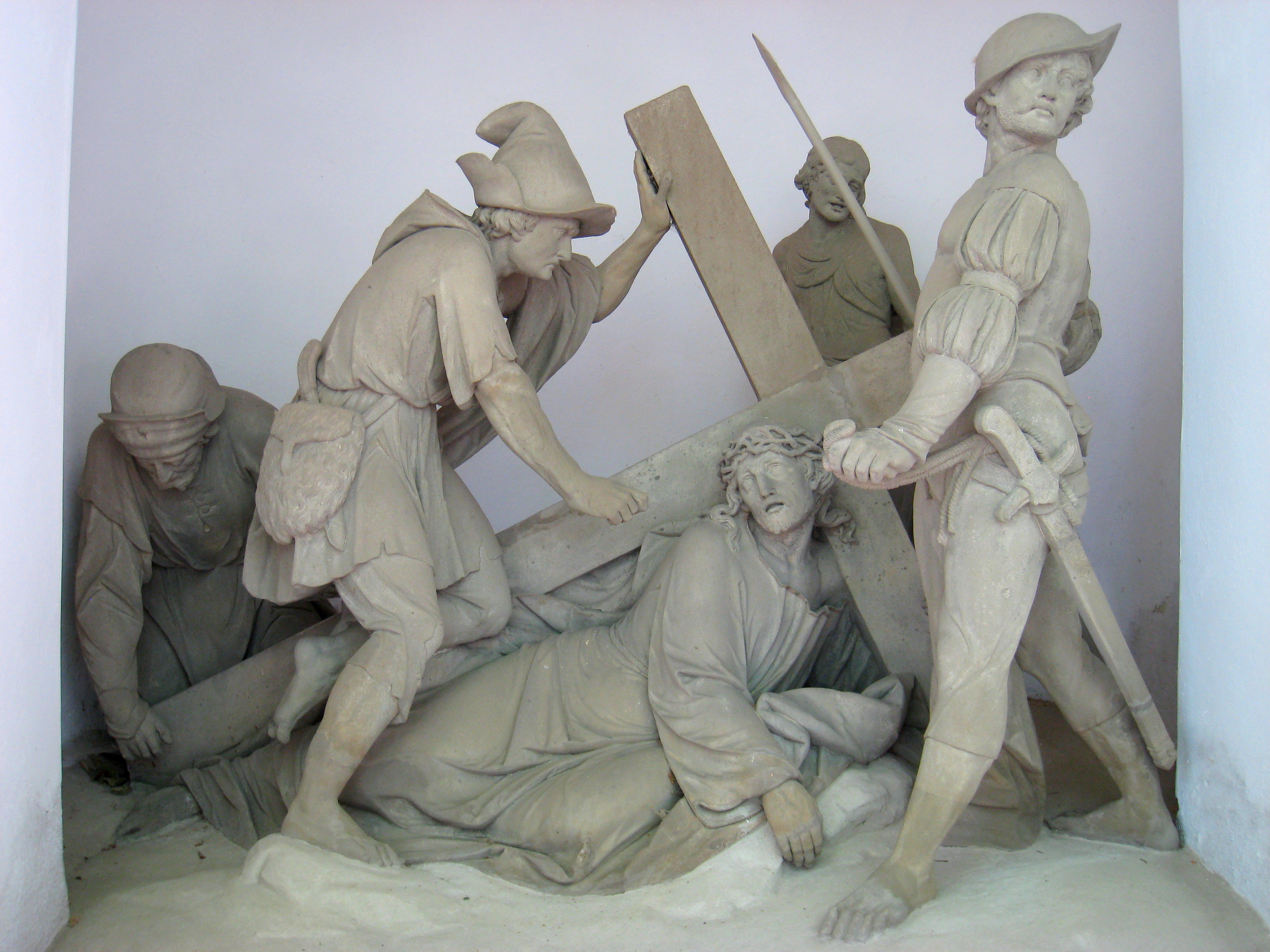
Station of the cross, Würzburg

Johann Peter Alexander Wagner (c.26 February 1730 (Note: Date of baptism) – 7 January 1809) was a German rococo sculptor.

== Life ==
Wagner was born in Theres, Unterfranken, Bavaria, Germany and was initially trained by his father, Johann Thomas Wagner. In 1747 he took up studies in Vienna under several another Johann Wagner and Balthasar Ferdinand Moll. He then moved to Mannheim and worked under Paul or Augustin Egell. After a visit to France in 1756, he went to Würzburg to work under Johann Wolfgang van der Auwera, court sculptor to Adam Friedrich von Seinsheim, Prince–Bishop of Würzburg. Auwera died that same year and Wagner married the widow, Maria Cordula Curé. He also assumed the workshop of his master along with Johann Wolfgang's brother, Lukas von der Auwera.

He created several utilitant items over the next several years including a console table (1759), the altar to the Augustinerkirche, Würzburg (1760), the altar and baptismal font to the Stadtpfarrkirche of St Maria and St Regiswindis, Gerolzhofen, Schweinfurt. He collaborated with Lukas von der Auwera between 1763 and 1766 on the Vierröhren Fountain, Würzburg carving the figures. In 1766 he moved on to a purely aesthetic work depicting the Crucifixion for a church in Kürnach. He continued the trend composing 14 groups of figures for the Wallfahrtskirche Mariae Heimsuchung between 1767 and 1775; the Stations of the Cross begun by Lukas von der Auwera.

In December 1771 he became the court sculptor to Prince von Seinsheim, for whom he created several works over the next decade. These works include decorative carvings for the building (primarily staircases) of Würzburg Residence and exterior statues of Pluto and Proserpina for the park of that palace. He also created statues of the Rape of Europa for a park at the bishop's summer palace,Schloss Veitshöchheim. He became particularly popular during this time and had much continued demand for ecclesiastical work. His work at the Klosterkirche of Ebrach Abbey, Oberfranken was emulated by those who worked under him for an Augustine monastery.

His style changed during his career from rococo to classical upon his assumption of the position of court sculptor, and finally back to rococo. 1790 saw him at his most classical in a life-size statue of the Virgin. He worked by first making a sketch, a detailed drawing, and conceptual clay bozzetti. He worked primarily in clay, wood and marble. His work may be seen in several museums in Würzburg, particularly the Mainfränkisches Museum. He was the father of Johann Martin von Wagner (born 24 June 1777) who trained as a sculptor under him. Johann Peter Alexander Wagner died in Würzburg on 7 January 1809.

== Sources ==
- The Grove Dictionary of Art
