= Würzburg Residence =

- Würzburger Residenz
- The garden front of Würzburg Residence

General information
- Type: Palace
- Architectural style: Baroque
- Location: Residenzplatz 2, 97070 Würzburg, Germany
- Coordinates: 49°47′34″N 9°56′19″E
- Groundbreaking: 1720
- Completed: 1744 (main structure); 1780 (interiors)
- Owner: Bavarian Administration of State-Owned Palaces, Gardens and Lakes

Website
- schloesser.bayern.de/wu_res

UNESCO World Heritage Site
- Official name: Würzburg Residence with the Court Gardens and Residence Square
- Includes: Residenz; Rosenbach Park
- Criteria: Cultural: (i), (iv)
- Reference: 169bis
- Inscription: 1981 (5th Session)
- Extensions: 2010
- Area: 14.77 ha (36.5 acres)
- Buffer zone: 25.0685 ha (61.946 acres)

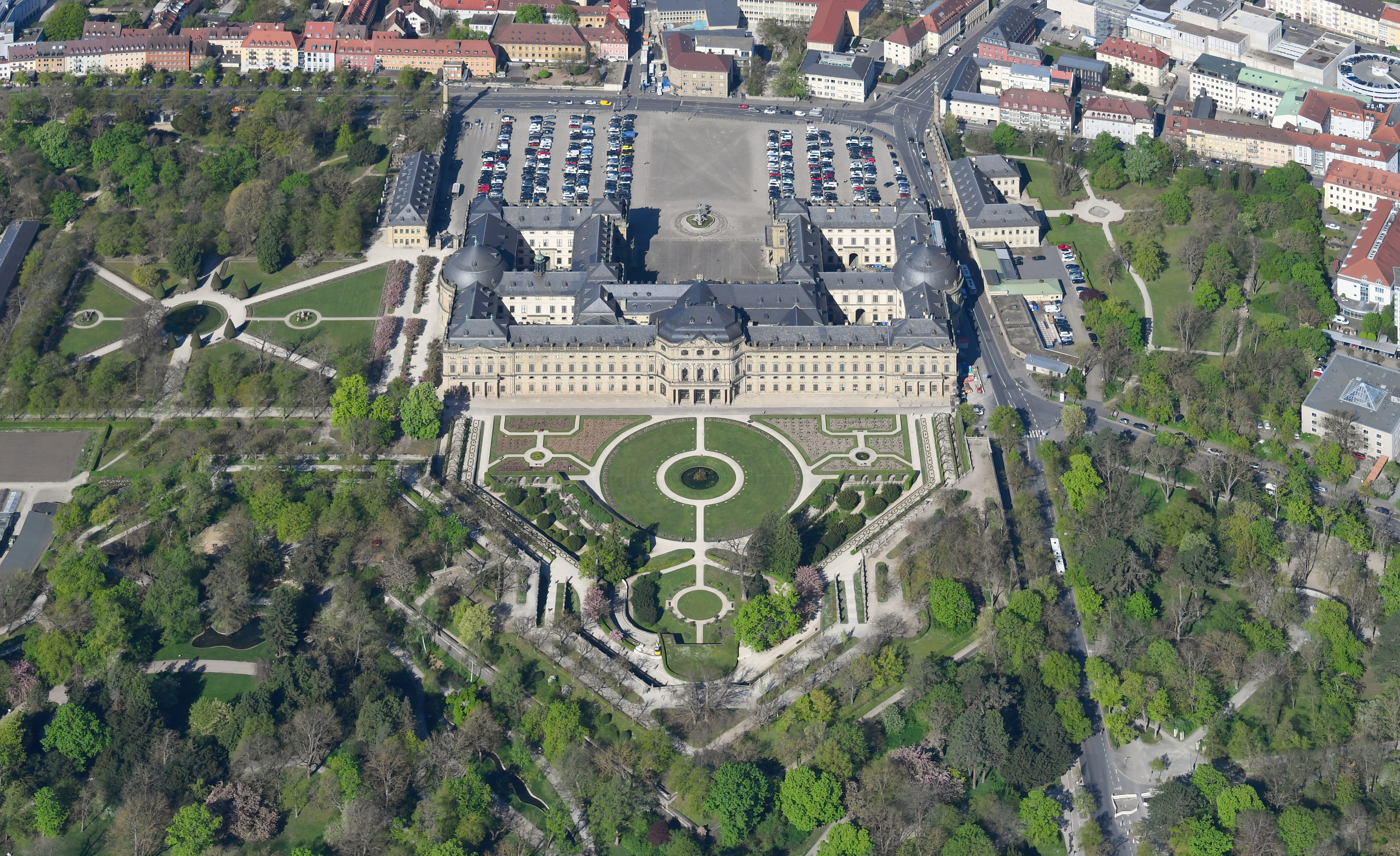
Aerial view of the Würzburg Residence with the Court Gardens and Residence Square

The Würzburg Residence (German: Würzburger Residenz) is a palace in Würzburg, Germany. Johann Lukas von Hildebrandt and Maximilian von Welsch, representatives of the Austrian/Southern German Baroque style, were involved in the construction, as well as Robert de Cotte and Germain Boffrand, who were followers of the French style. Balthasar Neumann, court architect of the Bishop of Würzburg, was the principal architect of the Residence, which was commissioned by the Prince-Bishop of Würzburg Johann Philipp Franz von Schönborn and his brother Friedrich Carl von Schönborn in 1720, and completed in 1744. The Venetian painter Giovanni Battista Tiepolo, assisted by his son, Domenico, painted frescoes in the building.

Interiors considered masterworks of Baroque/Rococo or Neoclassical architecture and art include the grand staircase, the chapel, and the Imperial Hall. The building was reportedly called the "largest parsonage in Europe" by Napoleon. It was heavily damaged by British bombing during World War II, and restoration has been in progress since 1945. Since 1981, the Residence has been a UNESCO World Heritage Site in recognition of its outstanding Baroque art, design, and architecture.

== History ==
=== 18th century ===
The Prince-Bishops of Würzburg resided in the Marienberg Fortress on a hill west of the Main river until the early 18th century. Johann Philipp Franz von Schönborn (1719–1724) moved the court to a palace erected in 1701–1704, the predecessor of the Residence. However, the rather small palace did not, in his opinion, measure up to his position as an absolute monarch – he was looking for something comparable to the Palace of Versailles or Schönbrunn Palace. Having won a sum of 600,000 florins (a fortune at the time) in a court case in the year of his accession, he used the funds to undertake a building project that would proclaim his political standing to all.

In this, he was eagerly supported by two relatives, his uncle the Archbishop of Mainz and Elector of Mainz, Lothar Franz von Schönborn (who confessed to having been possessed by a "Bauwurm", a building bug) and his brother Friedrich Carl von Schönborn, from 1704 to 1734 Imperial Vice-Chancellor in Vienna. Both supplied ideas and, crucially, artists from their circles. Friedrich Carl had met Hildebrandt in Vienna during the construction of the Belvedere. The foundation stone was laid on 22 May 1720. The construction started with the north block.

However, Johann Phillip Franz' successor, Prince-Bishop Christoph Franz von Hutten (1724–1729) had no great interest in building such an enormous palace. He only wanted the northern block to be finished. This construction was concluded in the year of his death. All other works ceased.

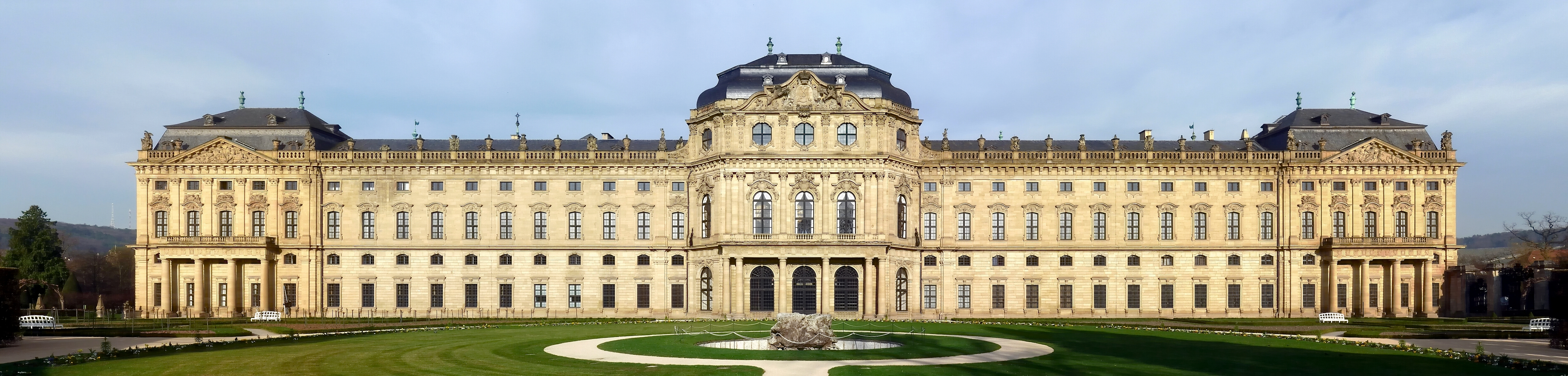
Garden façade of the Residence, leading into the Court Gardens

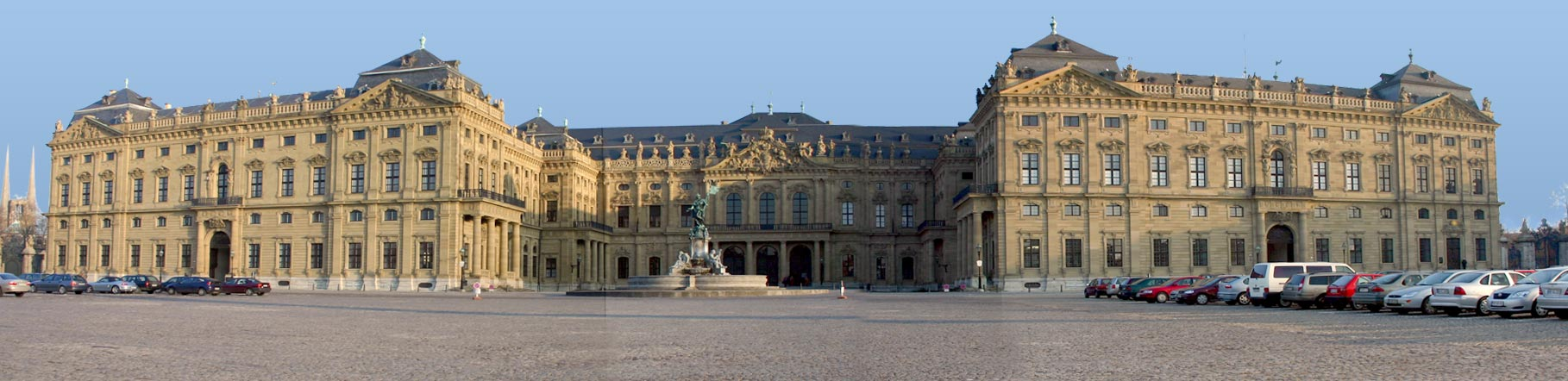
Front of the Residence and Cour d'honneur

In the year 1730, however, under Prince-Bishop Friedrich Carl von Schönborn (1729–1746), work on the south block began once more. In 1732–33, the front of the Cour d'honneur was completed. From 1735 onwards, the work on the central building took place with the participation of Lucas von Hildebrandt. In 1737, the main staircase by Balthasar Neumann was constructed. The garden front was completed in 1740 and the whole shell in December 1744. Neumann was mostly responsible for the Residence's town front, while Hildebrandt's work dominated the garden side. The four interior courts of the side wings were an idea of von Welsch.

The completion of the vaulted ceilings over the Emperor's Hall and the White Hall took place in 1742; the vault over the staircase in 1743. At the same time, the decorations of the Court Chapel were realized and its consecration was performed in 1743. From 1740 to 1745, the southern Kaiserzimmer (Imperial Apartments) and the Mirror Cabinet (Spiegelkabinett) were decorated by ornamental carver Ferdinand Hundt, by Johann Wolfgang van der Auvera, Antonio Giuseppe Bossi and Johann Rudolf Byss. Bossi also created the stucco-work in the White Hall during the years 1744–45.

Balthasar Neumann's staircase of the Würzburg Residence is considered a highlight of southern German Baroque.

Under the rule of Prince-Bishop Anselm Franz von Ingelheim (1746–1749), all building work on the Residence ceased once again. After his death, once Karl Philipp von Greifenclau zu Vollraths (1749–1754) became Prince-Bishop, he ordered a resumption of construction. In the same year, Antonio Bossi completed the stucco-work in the Garden Hall, the painting of which was finished in the next year. In 1750, Lorenz Jakob Mehling, a merchant at Venice, sent Giovanni Battista Tiepolo, the most famous fresco painter of his time, to the episcopal residence, after the painter Giuseppe Visconti had failed. Giovanni Battista Tiepolo, assisted by his sons, decorated the Imperial Hall and the ceiling above the staircase with frescoes in the early 1750s. The enormous staircase is vaulted by the largest continuous ceiling fresco in the world (approx. 580 m^{2}), painted between 1752 and 1753 by Giovanni Battista Tiepolo as well as his sons − especially Giovanni Domenico Tiepolo − and other helpers. In 1753, Balthasar Neumann died.

Under Prince-Bishop Adam Friedrich von Seinsheim (1755–1779), Materno and Ludovico Bossi created the stucco-work decoration over the staircase and in the first and second guest rooms of the northern Kaiserzimmer (Imperial Apartments) between 1769 and 1772. At the same time, the Green Lacquered Room and the Neoclassical Fürstensaal (Princes' Hall) were finished. From 1776 to 1781, the Ingelheimer Räume (Ingelheim Rooms) were decorated, including stucco-work by Materno Bossi.

The total construction cost came to over 1.5 million guilders, at a time when a day labourer could expect a weekly wage of one guilder.

=== 19th and early 20th centuries ===
The episcopal principality of Würzburg was abolished with secularization in 1802/03. An eight-year interregnum by Grand Duke Ferdinand of Tuscany (reigned 1806–1814), as Sovereign of the new Grand Duchy of Würzburg, followed during which he had several rooms of the south block, the so-called Toskanaräume (Tuscany Rooms), decorated in Empire style. Emperor Napoleon Bonaparte slept in the Residence when he stopped in Würzburg three times between 1806 and 1813. On 2 October 1806 he signed the declaration of war against Prussia here. A Neoclassical double bed and bedside tables were installed in the sleeping room of the northern Imperial Apartments for him and his wife Marie Louise in 1812.

In 1814, Würzburg became part of the Kingdom of Bavaria. The wrought-iron gates across the Cour d'honneur, which had effectively separated this inner area from the large Residence Square, were demolished in 1821. In their place today is the Frankoniabrunnen (fountain) created by Ferdinand von Miller the Younger. This was unveiled in 1894 as a tribute by the city of Würzburg and the whole of Franconia to Prince Regent Luitpold, who was born in 1821 in the Würzburg Residence itself.

Queen Victoria and Prince Albert stayed at the Residence on their way to Schloss Rosenau, Coburg, in August 1845. In 1921, the Residence was opened to the public.

=== Destruction in World War II ===
As a result of a devastating British air raid on 16 March 1945, the residence was almost completely burnt out and only the central building with the Vestibule, Garden Hall, Staircase, White Hall and Imperial Hall survived the inferno, their roofs destroyed. From the attic the fire ate down through wooden ceilings and floors, and all the furnishings and wall panelling which had not been stored elsewhere were devoured by the flames.

Much of the furnishing and large sections of the wall panelling of the period rooms had been removed in time and thus escaped destruction. Neumann's stone vaults withstood the collapse of the burning attic. However, because the roofs had gone, further damage was incurred in the ensuing period due to dampness. In the Court Chapel, for example, most of the ceiling frescoes by Byss succumbed to the subsequent consequences of the fire, in spite of the intact vault, and had to be laboriously reconstructed.

=== Post-war rebuilding ===
Frankoniabrunnen and facade of the Residence.

From 1945 to 1987, the building and its interiors were reconstructed to their current state. The rebuilding cost about €20m.

=== Inclusion in UNESCO World Heritage List ===
The Würzburg Residence with its Court Gardens and Residence Square was inscribed in the UNESCO World Heritage List in 1981. According to the Advisory Body Evaluation, the inclusion in the List was a "measure... so clearly desirable that the proposal of the Federal Republic of Germany does not require lengthy justification... The Residence is at once the most homogeneous and the most extraordinary of the Baroque palaces... It represents a unique artistic realization by virtue of its ambitious program, the originality of creative spirit and the international character of its workshop."

== Description ==
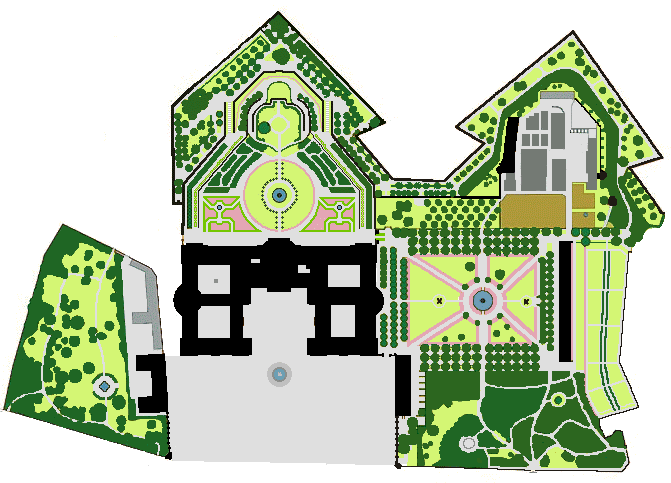
Map of Würzburg Residence with Court Gardens, including the Rosenbach Park (left)

=== Architectural plan ===
Sectional drawing

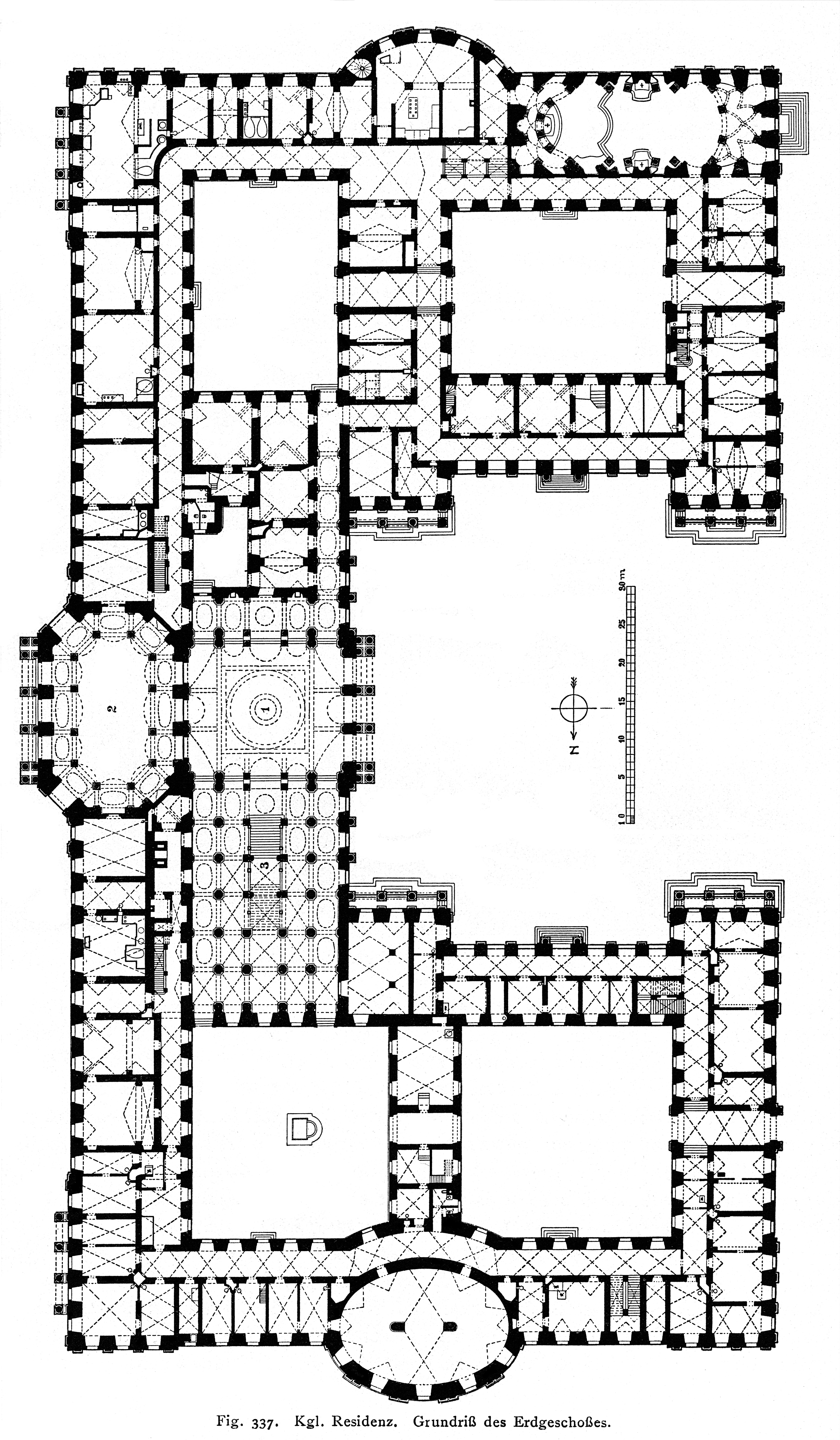
Ground floor

Main floor

=== Exterior ===
The Residence was constructed on a base plate of 92 × 167 meters. The main structure consists of a central wing with two side wings, the north and south blocks, each with two interior courts. On the town side the side wings extend 55 m from the main structure, partially enclosing the Cour d'honneur. Beneath the mansard roof there is a cornice, decorated with vases and trophies. The façade around the main portal in the Cour d'honneur is particularly richly decorated. It lacks the lower mezzanine floor (see below) but sports a large balcony above the three portals accessible from the Weisser Saal (White Hall). Above the entrance a large coat-of-arms of Friedrich Carl von Schönborn is located. The Hofkirche (court chapel) is completely integrated into the western part of the southern wing and barely distinguishable from the outside.

Originally, the Cour d'honneur was limited by a wrought iron enclosure. This masterpiece of ironworks by Joh. Georg Oegg was demolished in 1821 and sold at auction, because a member of the family of the King of Bavaria did not like them.

The outdoor square in front of the Residence today measures around 200 meters by 100 meters and is mostly used for parking. The monumental Frankoniabrunnen fountain from 1894 is located in the square.

=== Interior ===
The Residence has four floors, a high-ceiling ground and upper floor with a mezzanine floor above each. These served to enliven the façade and offered room for servants' quarters, kitchens and administrative offices.

The residence has almost 400 rooms.

==== Staircase ====
Main staircase

In Baroque style, the staircase gained importance as part of a formal reception room. The staircase of the Würzburg Residence spans its vault, an area of 18 by 32 meters (59 ft × 105 ft), without pillars. Beneath an unsupported trough vault, a masterpiece of construction with a maximum height of 23 meters (75 ft).

The lowest part of the stair leads away from the reception hall, towards a blank wall and then splits into two stairs which double back. Thus, the host on the upper landing was able to see his visitors first who initially walked away from him. When the guests turned and approached, the vast ceiling fresco above was increasingly revealed to them.

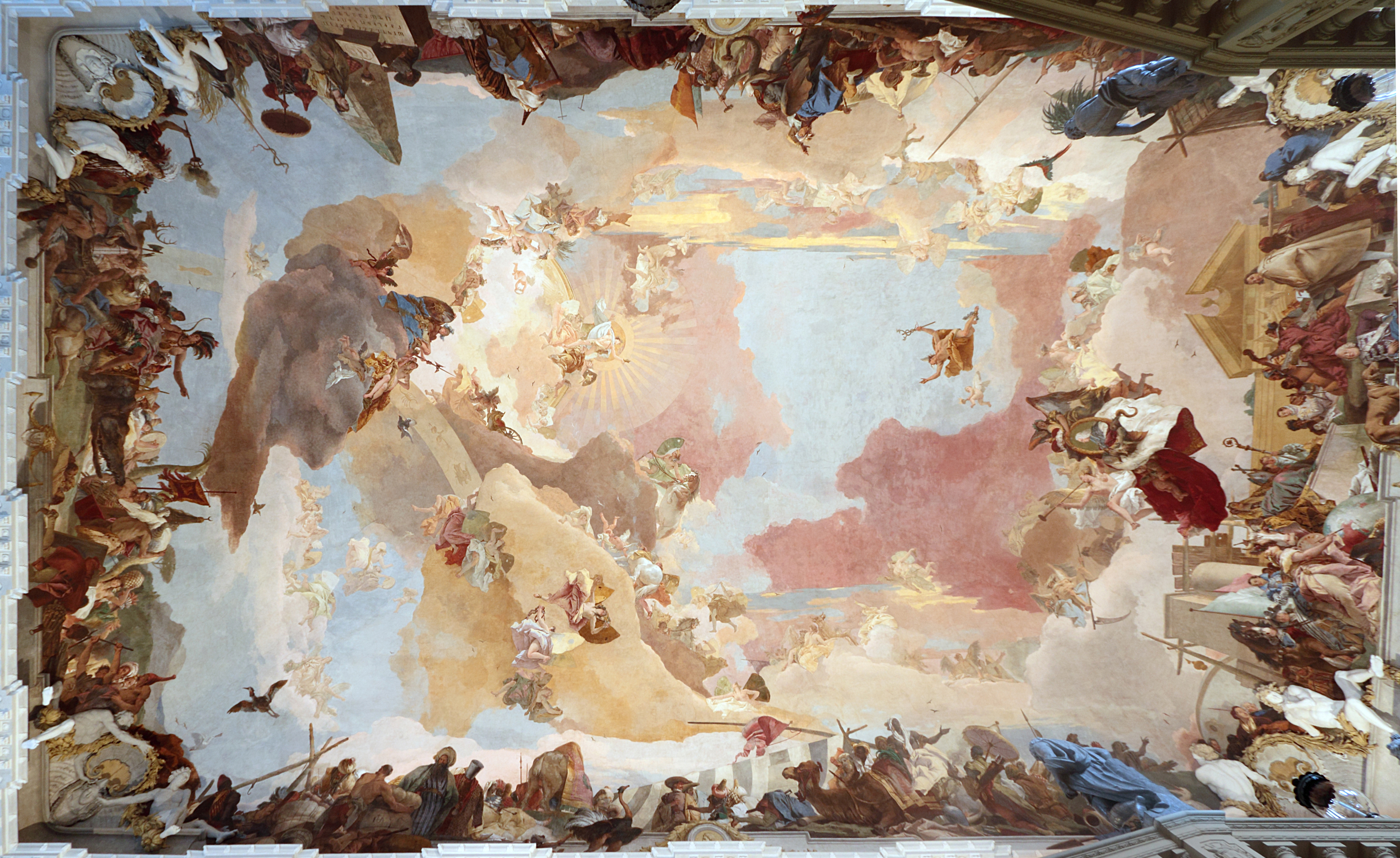
Ceiling Fresco

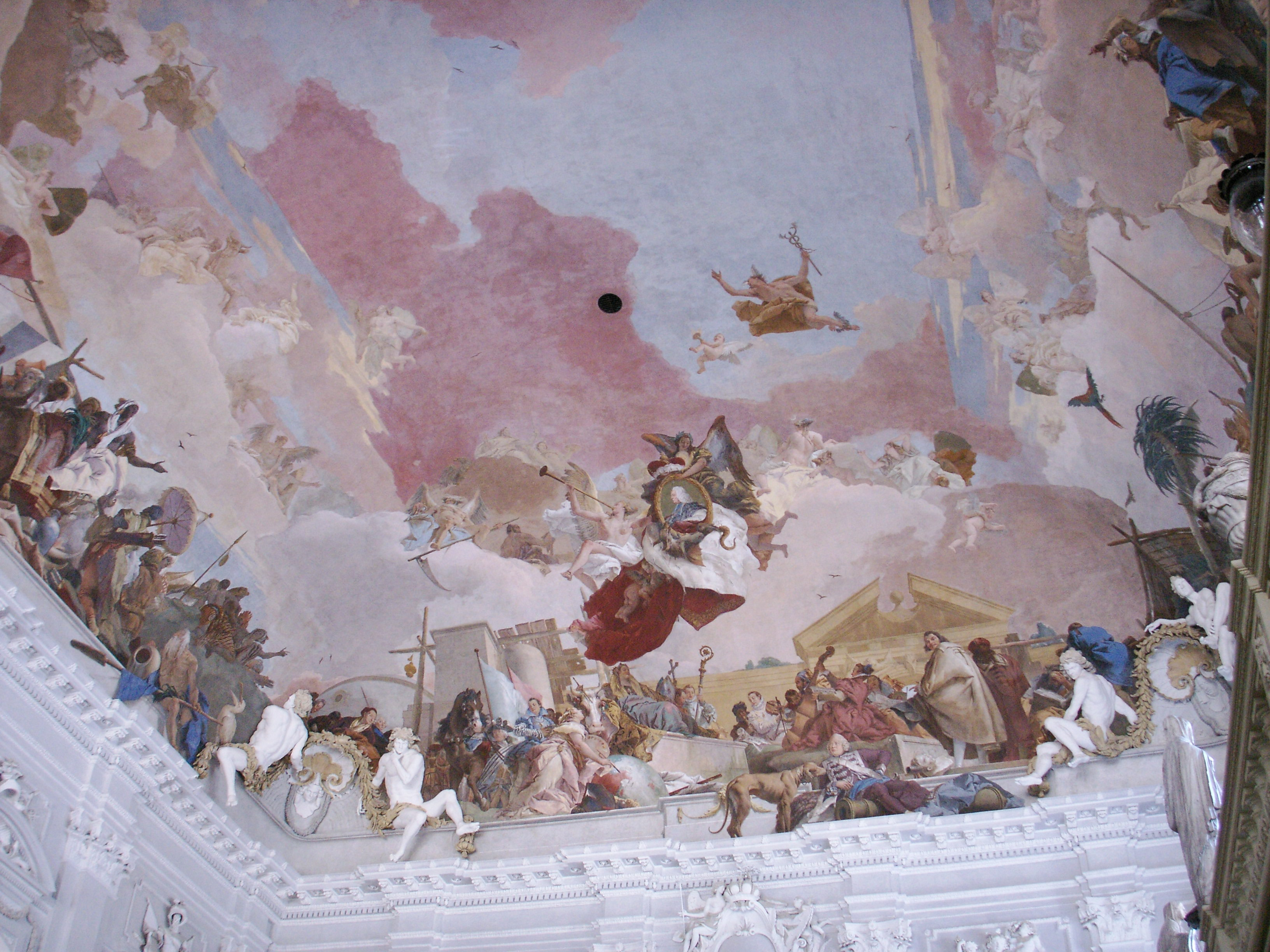
Partial Fresco

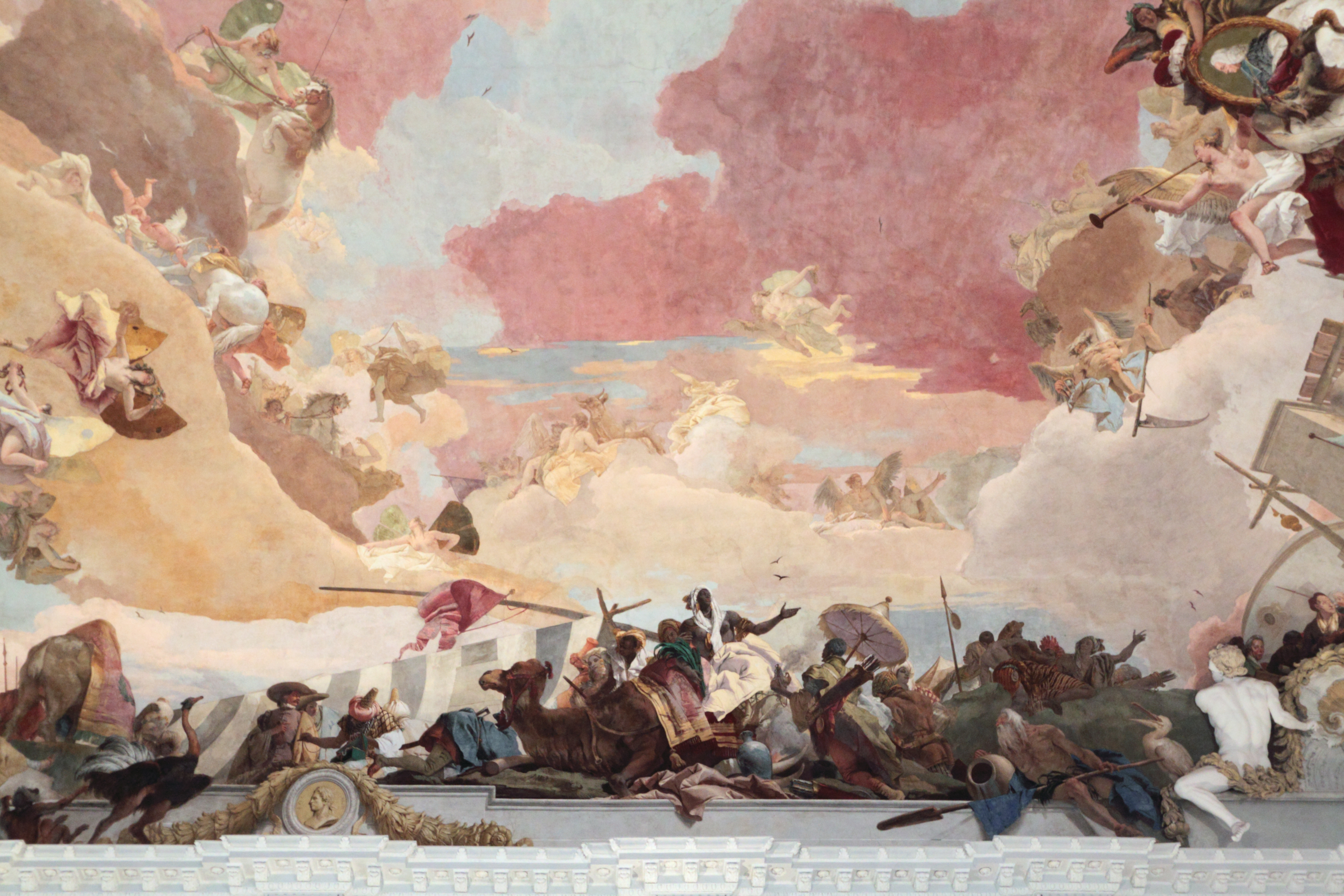
Africa

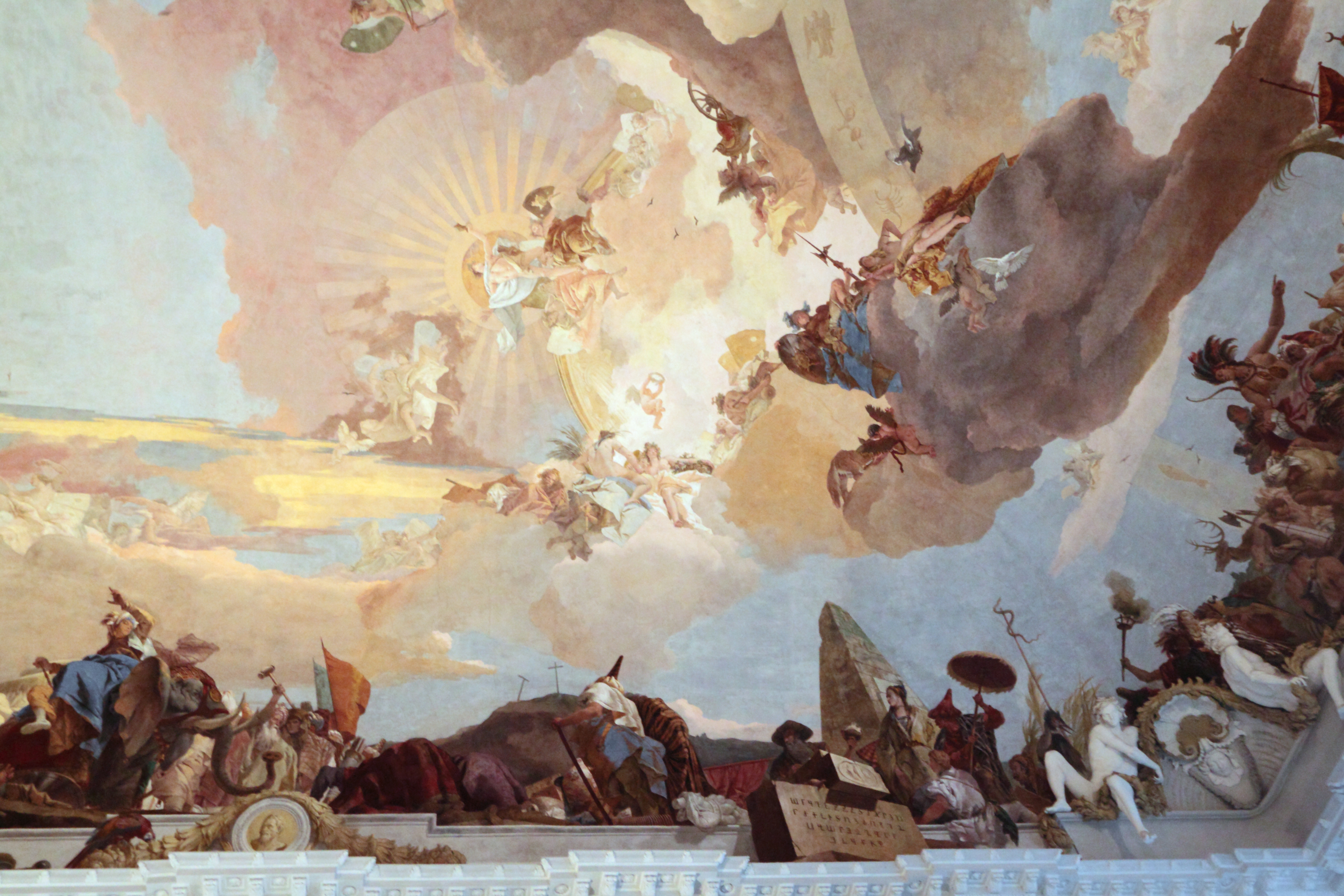
Apollo-Asia

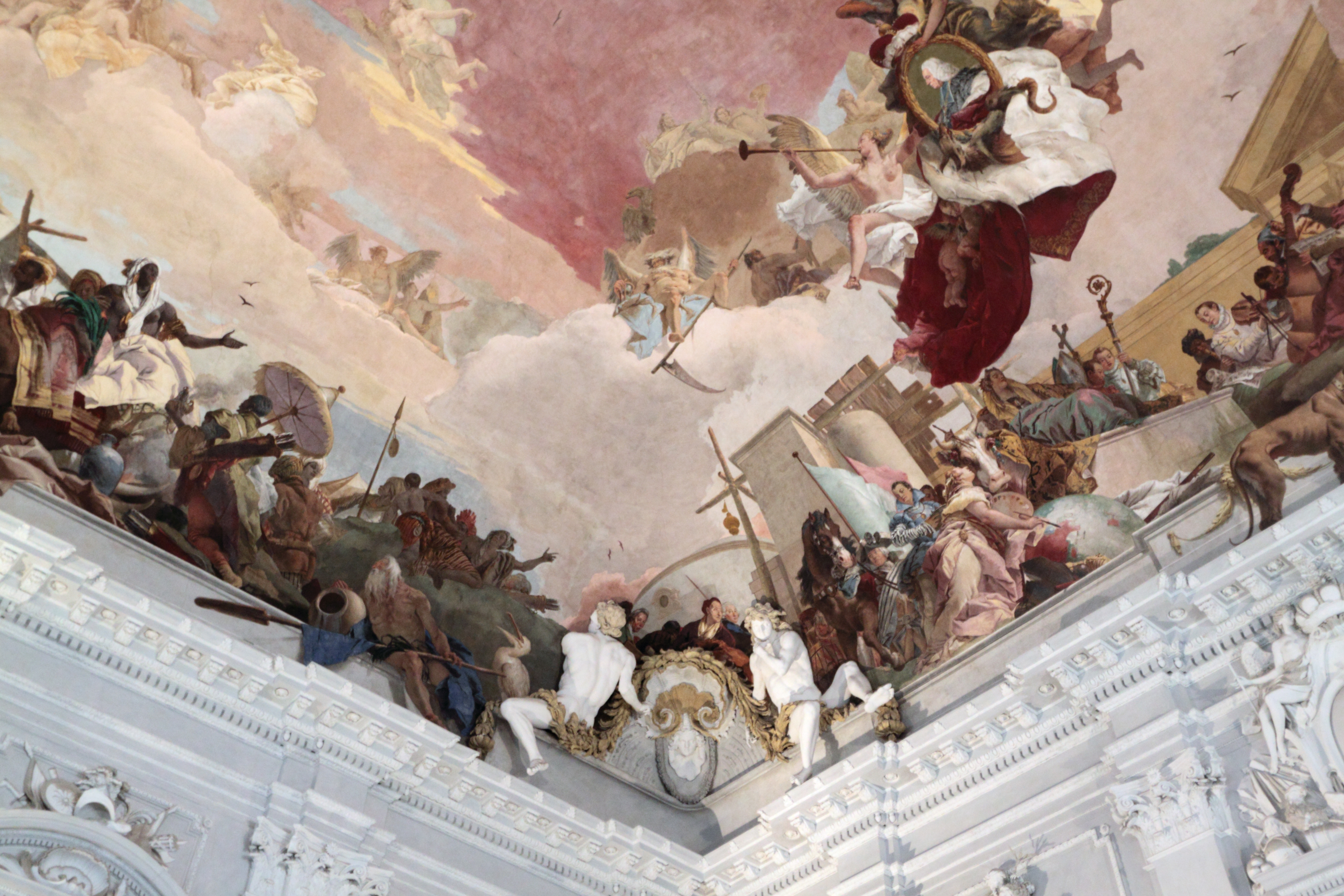
Africa-Europe

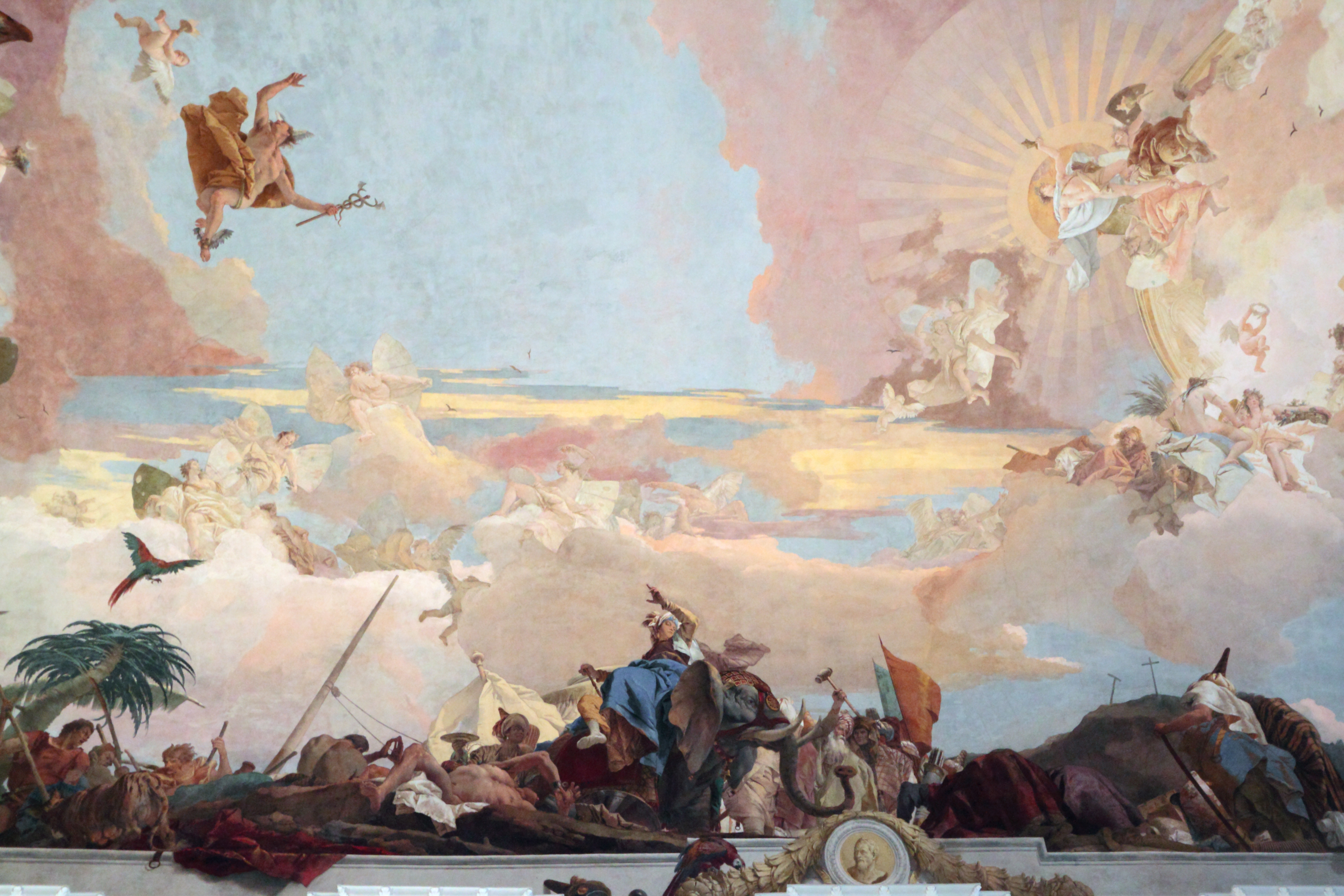
Asia

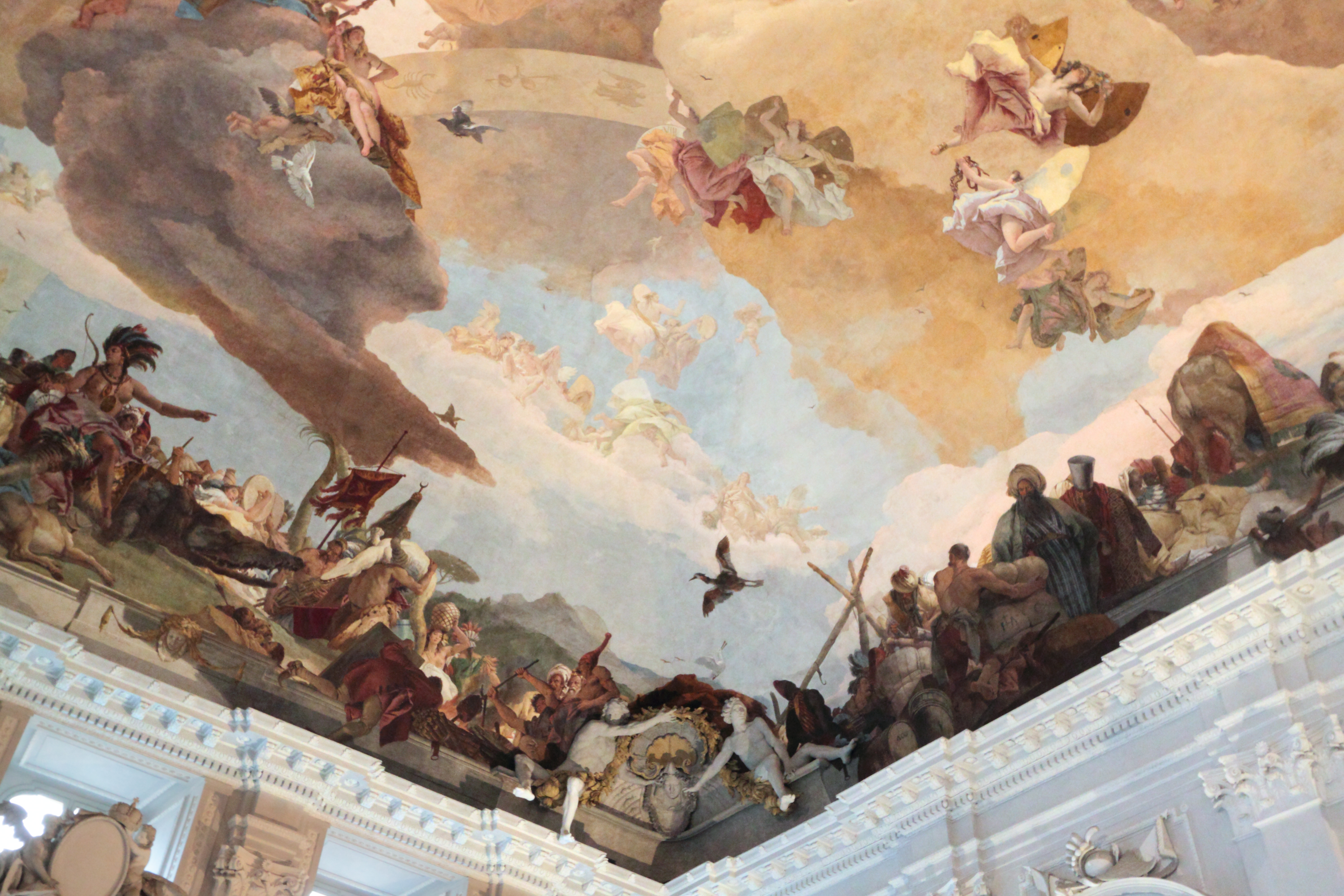
America-Africa

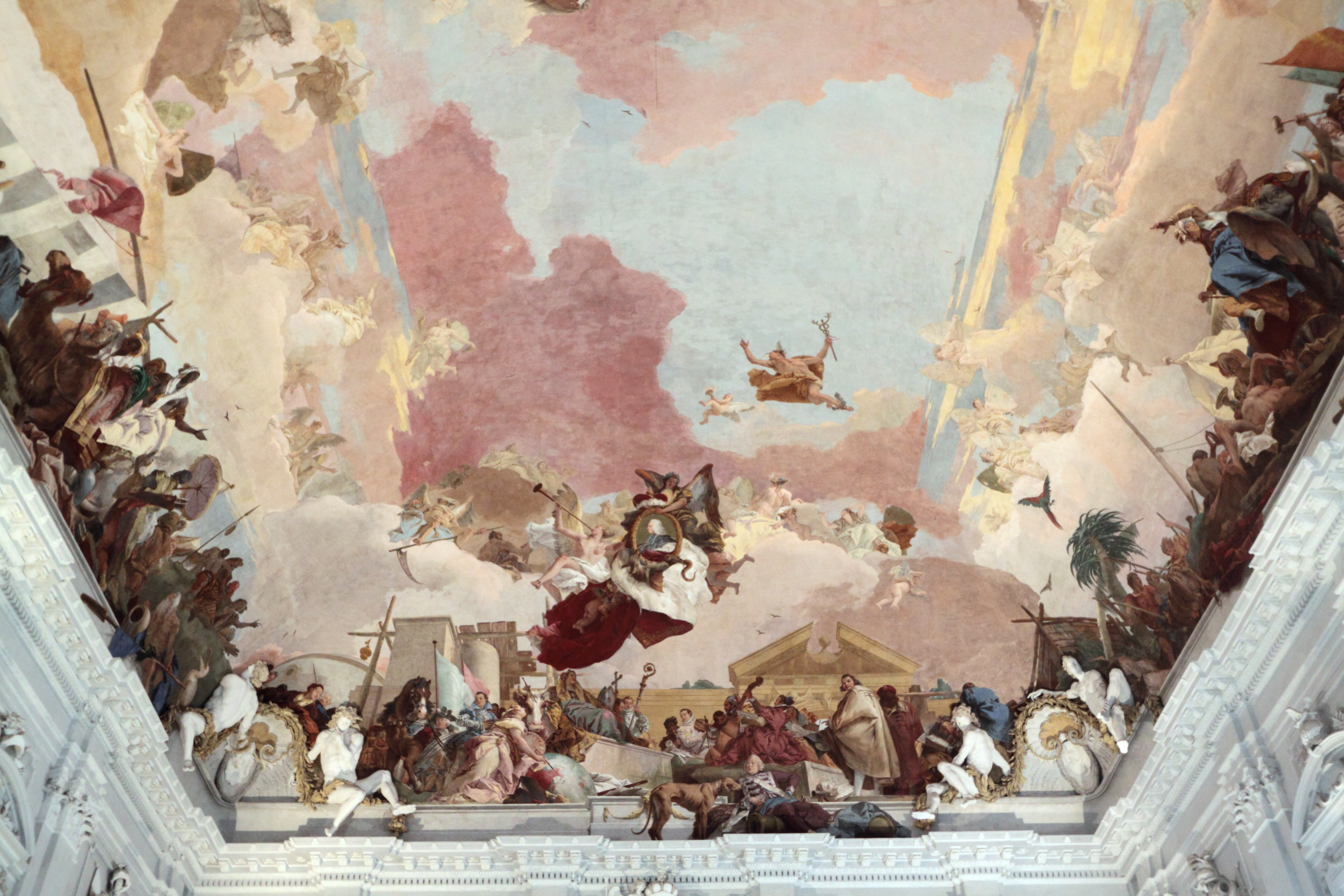
Europe

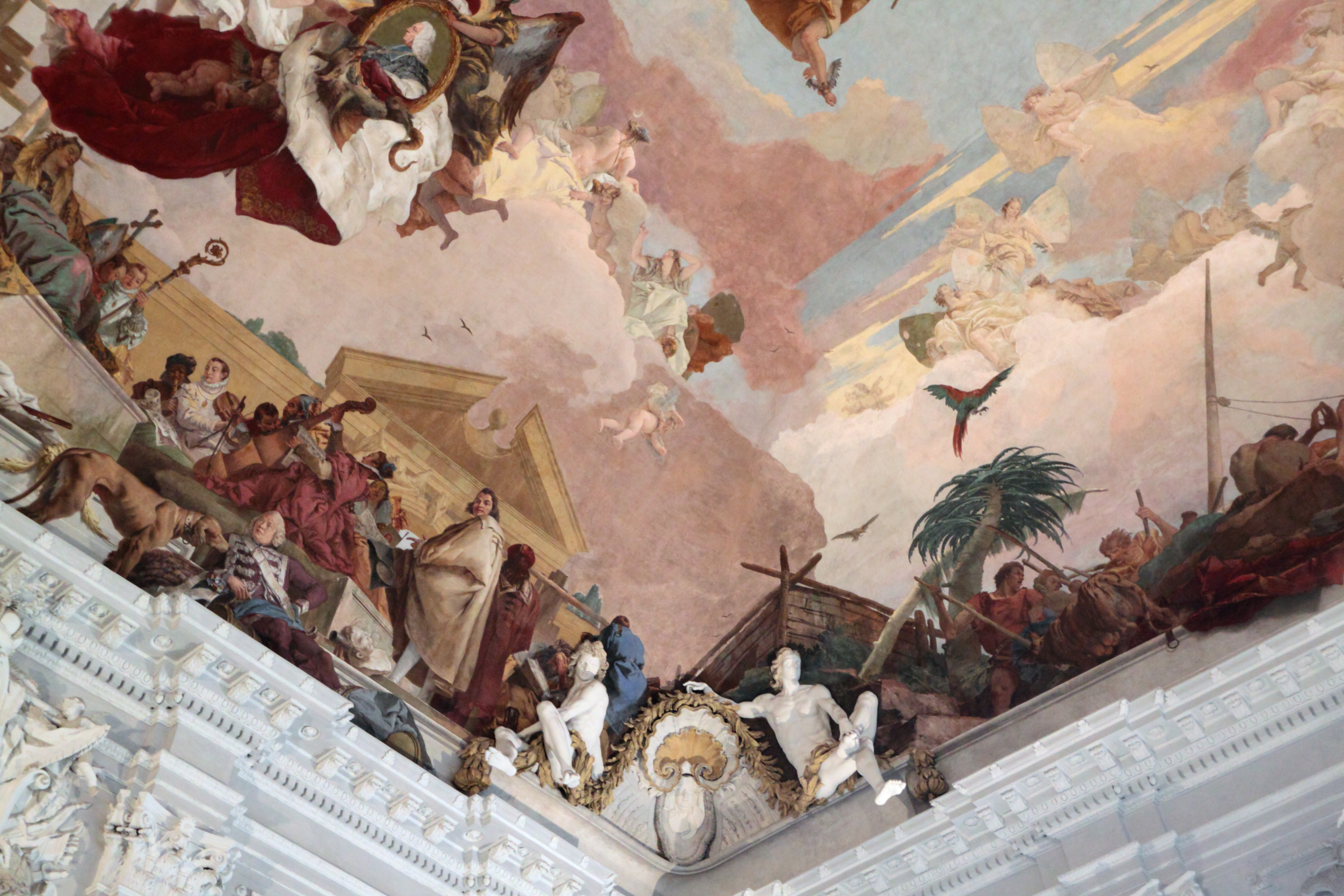
Europe-Asia

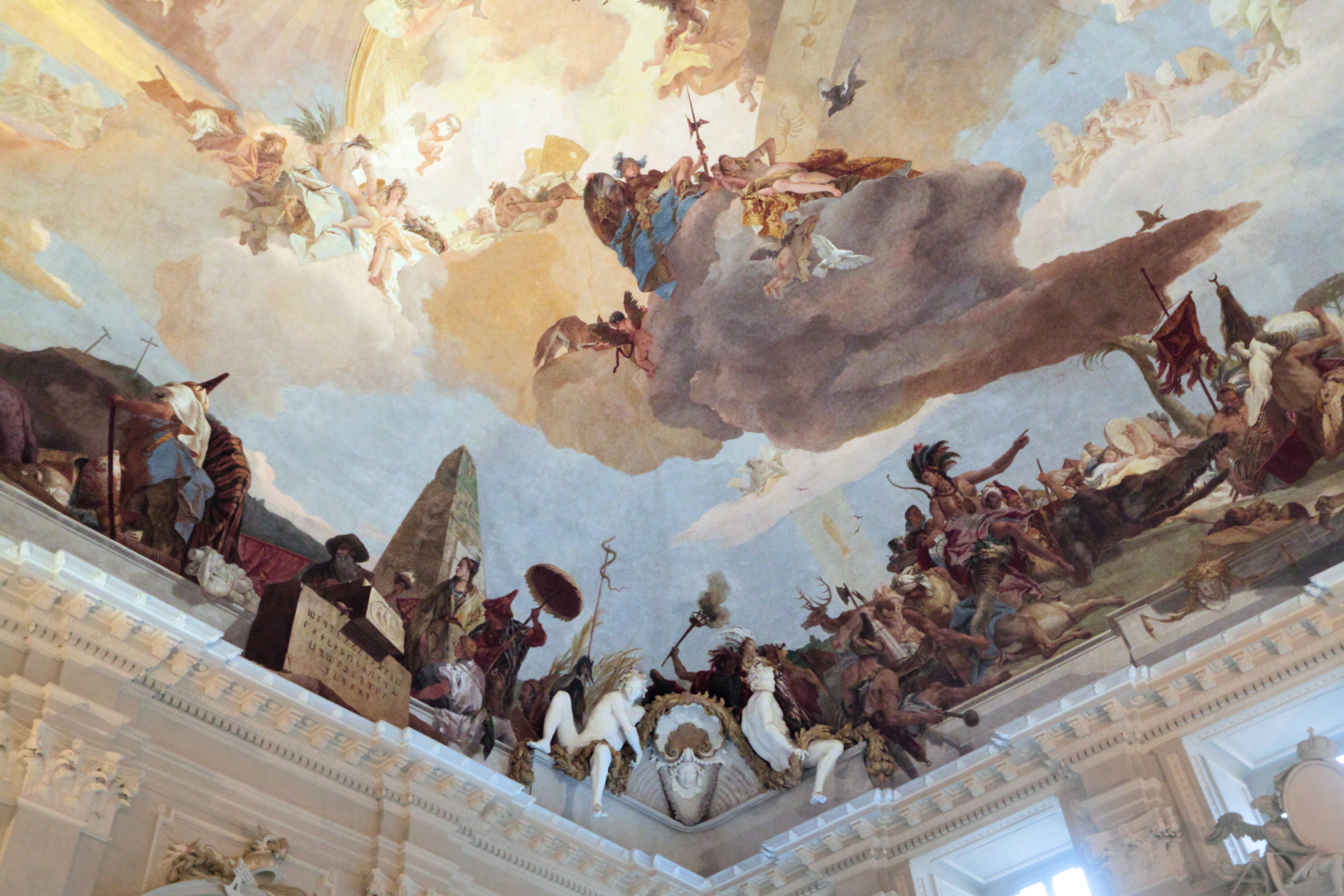
Asia-America

This fresco, the largest in the world, created from 1750 to 1753 by Venetian painter Giovanni Battista Tiepolo shows paintings of the four continents: Europe, America, Asia and Africa. Each continent is represented by a typical landscape and animals (or the painter's vision of these animals) and a female allegorical figure. Europe holds a sceptre, is symbolized by a bull, and has a boy playing with a cannon. America has natives with feathers, who practice cannibalism of prisoners, and a crocodile. Asia has a tiger and elephant, the crosses of Golgotha are visible in the background. Africans have a camel, and a caravan of turbanned Magi. Tiepolo was helped in his labors by his son Giandomenico and the stuccoist Antonio Bossi. There is also a picture of the Prince-Bishop with Mercury approaching from Olympus while Apollo launches the sun horses, surrounded by incarnations of the stars. The fresco also shows Tiepolo himself (in the southwest corner) and Neumann, in the center of the southern front, leaning on a cannon.

In preparation for his rendering of the large fresco, Tiepolo sketched a scaled-down version of the work; this sketch is on display in the Metropolitan Museum of Art.

Court architect Balthasar Neumann had to fight concerns about the dangers of such an enormous vault. Contrary to the vault with its colors, the stairs and the walls have hardly any decoration at all. While the vault is decorated in the Baroque style, the rest of the staircase is already decorated in the following Neoclassical style.

Neumann originally wanted to add a second staircase on the other side of the White Hall, but this was vetoed by the Prince-Bishop's advisers due to the costs involved.

The staircase was depicted on the back of the final version of 50 Deutsche Mark banknotes, which featured Neumann on the front.

==== White Hall ====
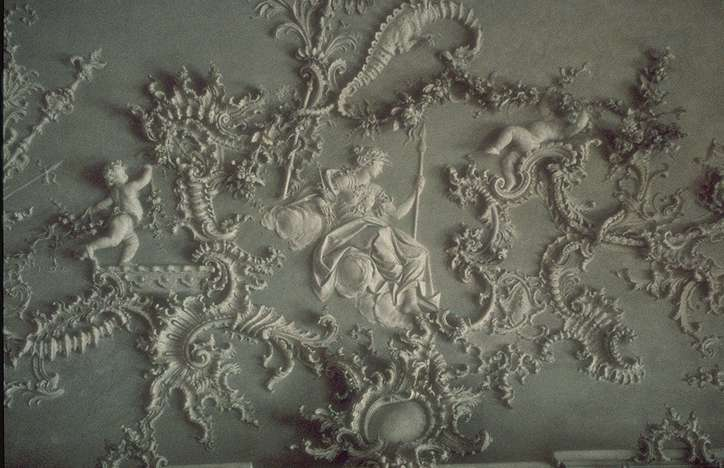
Detail of the stucco work of the White Hall

The Weisser Saal or White Hall in Rococo style was the audience chamber and is dominated by the stucco decorations of Antonio Bossi. The white stucco works on a light gray background are composed of a large quantity of rocailles, mixed with images of real items, especially of military purpose.

The lack of gold and colour allows the eye to rest between the splendours of the staircase and the Kaisersaal beyond. Five crystal chandeliers were used to light the room.

==== Imperial Hall or Kaisersaal ====
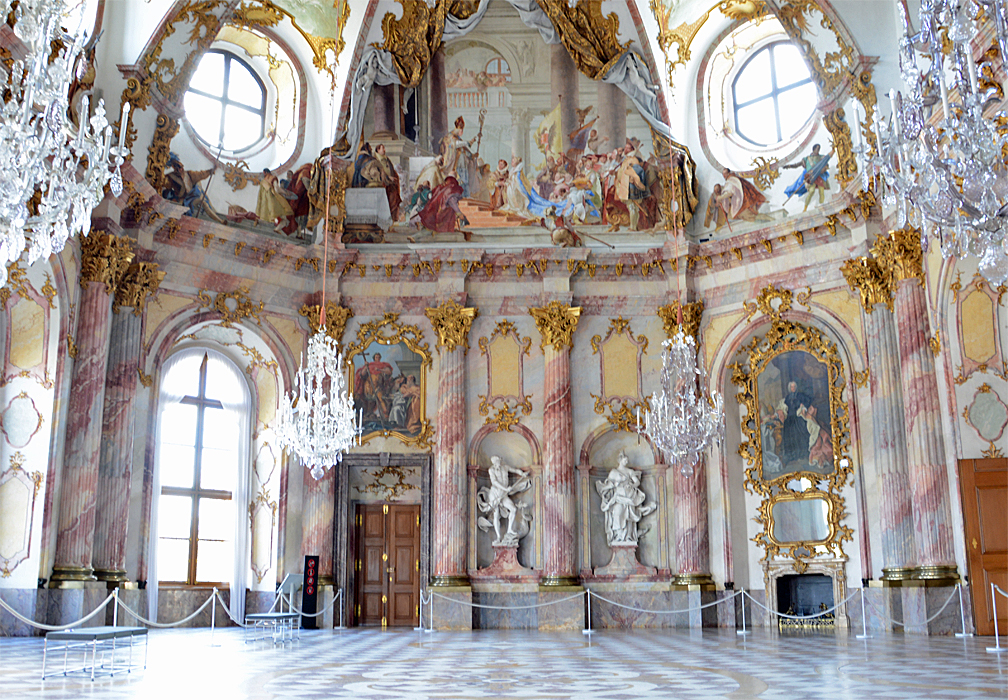
Kaisersaal

The marriage of Emperor Frederick I and Beatrix of Burgundy, by Tiepolo

This hall opens to the east from the White Hall and is located in the center of the garden front. It was used to receive visiting dignitaries, including the Emperors-to-be on their voyage to Frankfurt and on the return trip to Vienna. It was created in 1749–1751 at enormous cost.

The walls of the Imperial Hall consist of stucco work marble in shades of red, white and yellow. The dome is painted in white colour, decorated with golden stucco work and also frescoes by Tiepolo, showing an idealized history of the diocese of Würzburg. One picture, Die Trauung Kaiser Barbarossas und der Beatrix von Burgund durch den Würzburger Fürstbischof 1156 shows the marriage of Emperor Frederick I Barbarossa and Countess Beatrix of Burgundy, consecrated by Gerold, Bishop of Würzburg. The opposite picture shows Frederick II appointing the Bishop of Würzburg Duke of Franconia. On top of the dome a painting shows the Brautfahrt: Apollo in the sun chariot leads the bride Beatrix surrounded by Venus, Ceres and Bacchus towards the Emperor Frederick II, who is accompanied by the Bishop of Würzburg.

Giovanni's son Domenico created the supraportes: Emperor Justinian I publishes the Corpus Juris Civilis, Emperor Constantine the Great orders the execution of Gallus, Ambrose denies access to the church to Emperor Theodosius I. Bossi's figures show Poseidon and Juno as well as Flora and Apollo.

==== Southern and Northern Imperial Apartments or Kaiserzimmer ====
When all the doors are opened between these halls they create an enfilade stretching along the garden front extending a total of 150 meters. These rooms served as reception halls and as accommodation for important guests.

Spiegelsaal

The impact of both apartments is generated by a sequence of rooms of increasing degrees of decoration. The most decorated room of the Southern Apartment is the Spiegelsaal or Mirror Cabinet. Its walls consist entirely of glass panels, decorated on the back using either paintings, or drawings engraved into a gold ground and then underlaid with dark gloss paint. All the paintings and drawings show oriental, especially Chinese, scenes. The southern part also includes the Toskanasaal. The highlight of the Northern Apartment is the Green Lacquered Room. Its multilayered wall coverings consist of a metallic green color decorated with paintings and golden ornaments.

==== Court Chapel (Hofkirche) ====
Interior of the Residence Hofkirche

The Court Chapel is a prime example of the sacral Baroque style in Germany. The interior design is dominated by the curving walls and three intergradient oval dome vaults.

It extends upwards through both of the main floors of the Residence. The supporting columns are made from agate-coloured marble. The columns of the two side altars and the six statues are made from white marble, carved at Genoa. The side altars are based on designs by Hildebrandt and were painted in 1752 by Tiepolo (Assumption of Mary to the south, War in Heaven to the north). The high altar is made from stucco created to look like marble by Antonio Bossi. Above the altar is a matroneum with a statue of the Immaculate Conception in the centre and oratories on both sides. Bossi was also responsible for the colourful stucco work on the ceiling (1735) and with painters Högler and Thalhofer created the frescoes in the domes (1735–6): martyrdom of the three Franconian apostles Kilian, Totnan and Kolonat (over the choir), Coronation of the Virgin (in the centre) and War in Heaven (above the organ).

=== Court Gardens ===
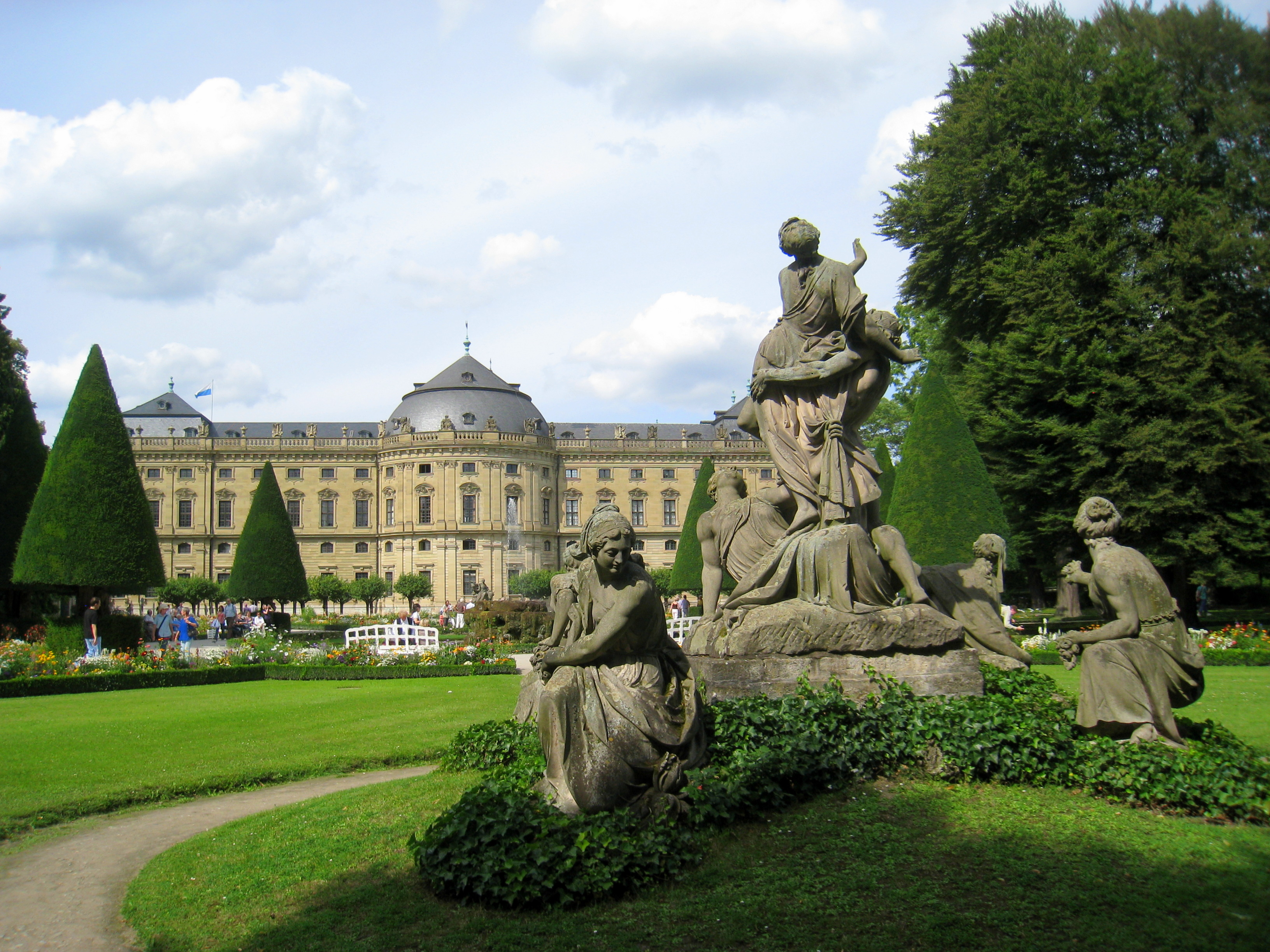
View of the Residence from the Court Gardens with the Abduction of Proserpina in the front

The Residence was built when Würzburg was still a fortified town. Therefore, the garden had to be planned within the fortifications. The solution included two bastions of the fortified town wall, using its differences in height to create a very special landscape. From west to east there is a rise in ground, until the level of the wall is reached. Near the residence itself, the Hofgarten (or Court Gardens) is designed in a very formal, Baroque style. Farther away, the style changes to an English garden with small forests and meadows. Designs for the former part were made by Johann Lukas von Hildebrandt, Neumann and François de Cuvilliés. It was mainly created in 1759–70. Johann Peter Alexander Wagner added putti, vases, urns and two monumental sculpture groups, the Rape of Europa and the abduction of Proserpina, sited in the central axis between the Orangery and the southern pavilion of the Residence. The figures were added to the park under Prince-Bishop Adam Friedrich von Seinsheim, who had the park at Veitshöchheim similarly decorated. Three monumental gates lead to the Court Gardens, commissioned by Friedrich Karl von Schönborn from Joh. Georg Oegg.

== Today ==
The gardens and representative rooms described above are open to the public. A memorial room is dedicated to the Residence's destruction in March 1945. It also honours Major John Davis Skilton, a "Monuments man" of the U.S. Army who was instrumental in preserving many of the art treasures after his arrival at Würzburg in June 1945.

Most of the rest of the residence is occupied by the Martin von Wagner Museum (moved here in 1963) and organizations of the University of Würzburg.

Some scenes of the 2011 film The Three Musketeers were filmed at Würzburg Residence.

=== Gallery ===
Main entrance.

Main staircase.

Fresco by Giovanni Battista Tiepolo over the main staircase.

Trompe-l'œil dome in der residence.

Hofkirche.

Ceiling of the Hofkirche.

Ceiling of the Spiegelsaal.

Ceiling of the Gartensaal.

Gardens.

Rape of Persephone by Johann Peter Wagner.

== See also ==
- List of Baroque residences
- 18th-century Western domes
