= Anselm Franz von Ingelheim =

Anselm Franz von Ingelheim may refer to:

- Anselm Franz von Ingelheim (Archbishop of Mainz) (1634–1695), 17th-century Roman Catholic archbishop-elector
- Anselm Franz von Ingelheim (Bishop of Würzburg) (1683–1749), 18th-century Roman Catholic prince-bishop
