= Franz Ludwig von Erthal =

Prince-Bishop of Würzburg and Bamberg from 1779 to 1795

- Prince-Bishop of Würzburg
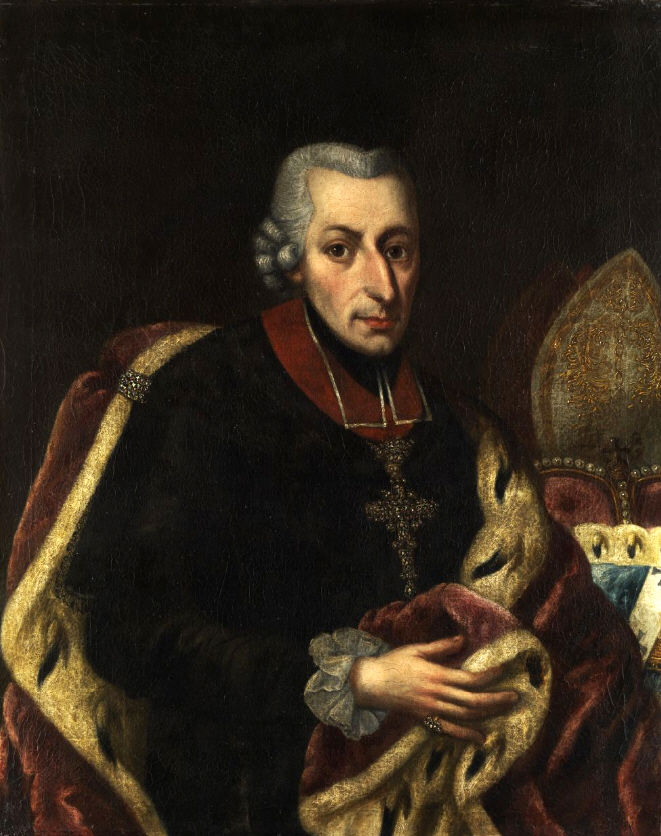
- Church: Catholic Church
- Diocese: Diocese of Würzburg
- In office: 12 July 1779 – 14 February 1795
- Predecessor: Adam Friedrich von Seinsheim
- Successor: Georg Karl Ignaz von Fechenbach zu Laudenbach
- Other post: Bishop of Bamberg (1779-1795)

Orders
- Consecration: 19 September 1779 by Friedrich Karl Joseph von Erthal

Personal details
- Born: 16 September 1730 Loarn, Prince-Bishopric of Würzburg, Franconian Circle, Holy Roman Empire
- Died: 14 February 1795 (aged 64) Würzburg, Prince-Bishopric of Würzburg, Franconian Circle, Holy Roman Empire

Franz Ludwig Freiherr von Erthal (16 September 1730 in Lohr am Main – 14 February 1795 in Würzburg) was the Prince-bishop of Würzburg and Bamberg from 1779 until his death. He was buried at the Würzburg Cathedral (#45 diagram).

== Early life and ancestry ==
Born into the House of Erthal, an ancient Franconian noble family, Franz Ludwig was the son of Baron Philipp Christoph von und zu Erthal (1689-1748), Lord Marshal and Vice-President of the Chamber of Electorate of Mainz, and his wife, Baroness Maria Eva von Bettendorf (d. 1738). He was younger brother of Friedrich Karl Joseph von Erthal, Prince-elector and Archbishopric of Mainz.

== Biography ==
From 1779 until his death, he was very prudent as the prince-bishop of Bamberg and Würzburg in personal union. He was permeated with the ideas of the Enlightenment and promoted the education of the clergy. In Bamberg, he built the first modern hospital and introduced a first public social insurance. The University of Bamberg received a chair for veterinary medicine under its government. Politically, he was loyal to the House of Habsburg and close to Emperor Joseph II.

Unlike his predecessor Adam Friedrich von Seinsheim, Erthal disapproved of worldly pleasures, and there were no hunts and opera performances at his court. The Würzburg Residenz was however completed during his reign.

Catholic Church titles
Preceded by Adam Friedrich von Seinsheim	Prince-Bishop of Würzburg; 1779–1795	Succeeded by Georg Karl Ignaz von Fechenbach zu Laudenbach
Preceded by Adam Friedrich von Seinsheim	Prince-Bishop of Bamberg; 1779–1795	Succeeded by Christoph Franz von Buseck
