= Christoph Franz von Buseck =

German bishop and monarch

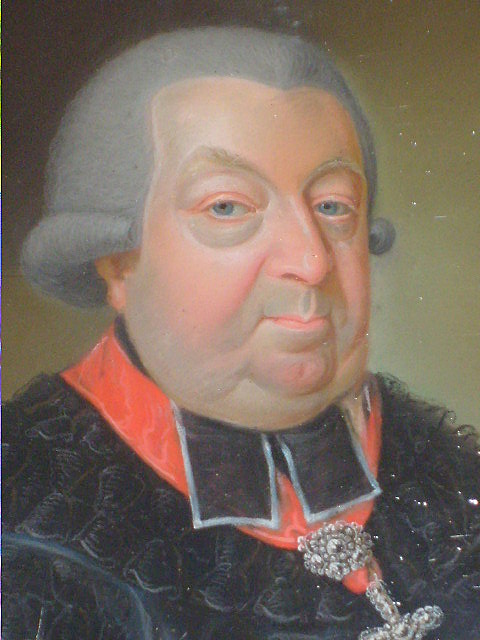
Prince-Bishop Christoph Franz von Buseck, 1795. Painting by JB Hirschmann.

Christoph Franz von Buseck (28 December 1724 - 28 September 1805) was the Roman Catholic bishop of Bamberg and the last Prince-Bishop of Bamberg.

== Early life ==
Von Buseck was born in Jagstberg to Ernst Johann Philipp Hartmann von Buseck and Mary Ann. Almost nothing is known of his early life.

== Tenure as Bishop ==
On 7 April 1794, von Buseck was elected Prince-Bishop of Bamberg and ordained to the priesthood. His nephew, Georg Karl von Fechenbach, the Prince-Bishop of Würzburg, consecrated him as a bishop on 16 August 1795 and he took office. Von Buseck proved to be a very weak ruler. In 1796, when Bamberg was invaded by the French, von Buseck fled to Prague. When the French invaded Prague in 1799, he fled to Saalfeld. He returned to Bamburg in 1800 and appointed his nephew as his coadjutor bishop and successor.

In the course of the German mediatization of 1802–1803, which saw the suppression of all the Holy Roman Empire ecclesiastical principalities, Bavaria occupied the former prince-bishopric on 29 September 1802 and annexed its territories. However, until his death on 28 September 1805, von Buseck remained bishop of Bamberg, but bereft of any temporal power. He was then succeeded by his nephew. After his nephew's death in 1808, the See remained vacant until 1818, by which time Bamberg had been elevated to an archbishopric following the Bavarian Concordat of June 1817.

== See also ==
- List of monarchs who lost their thrones in the 19th century

Catholic Church titles
Preceded by Franz Ludwig von Erthal	Prince-Bishop of Bamberg; 1795–1802	Succeeded by Prince-Bishopric Mediatised to Bavaria 1802
Preceded by Self (as Prince-Bishop)	Bishop of Bamberg; 1802–1805	Succeeded by Georg Karl Ignaz von Fechenbach zu Laudenbach
