= Georg Karl Ignaz von Fechenbach zu Laudenbach =

- Prince-Bishop of Würzburg
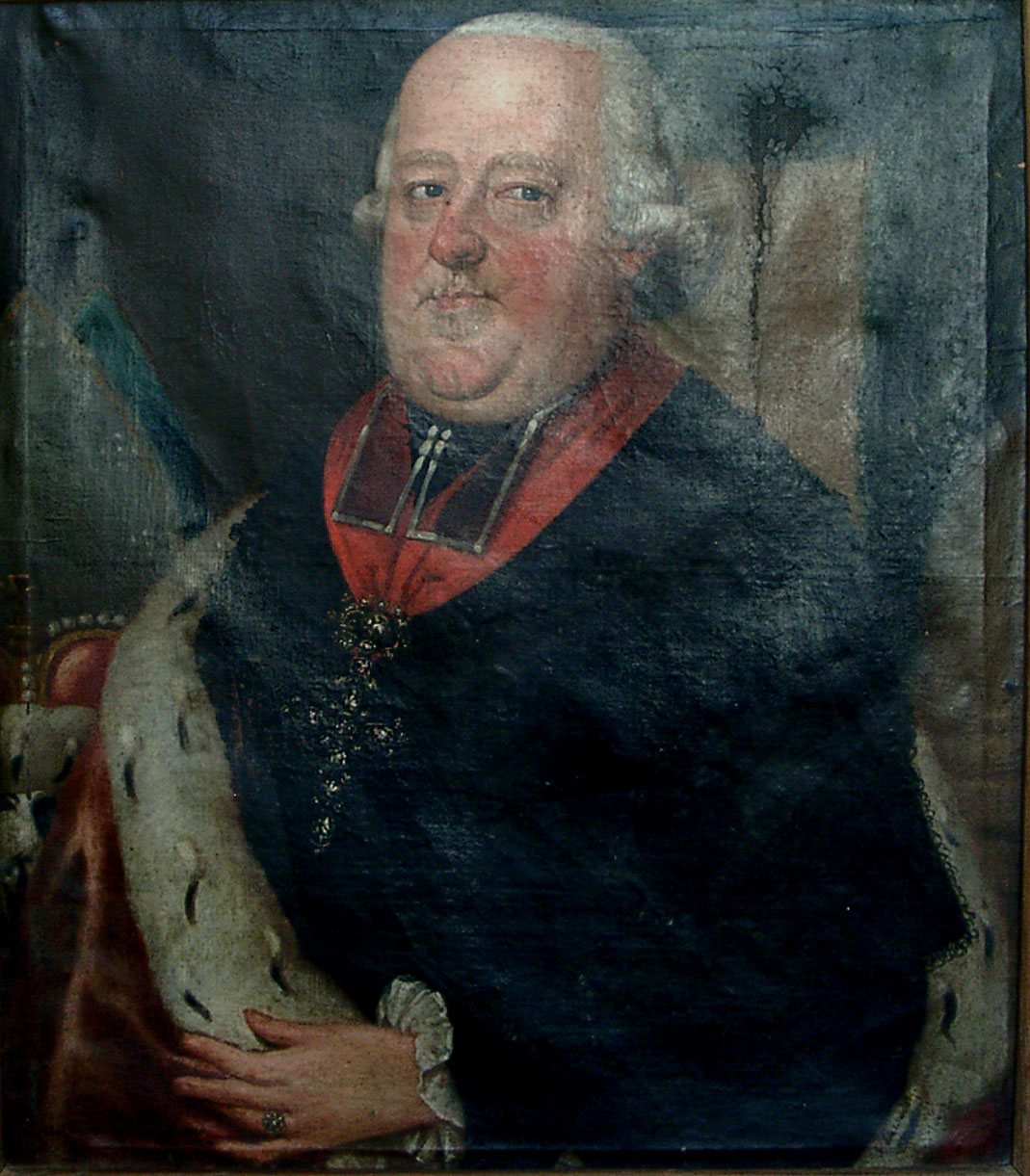
- Church: Catholic Church
- Diocese: Diocese of Würzburg
- In office: 1 June 1795 – 9 April 1808
- Predecessor: Franz Ludwig von Erthal
- Successor: Adam Friedrich Groß zu Trockau
- Other post: Diocese of Bamberg (1805-1808)
- Previous post: Coadjutor Bishop of Bamberg (1800-1805)

Orders
- Ordination: 18 February 1779
- Consecration: 21 June 1795 by Karl Theodor Anton Maria von Dalberg

Personal details
- Born: 20 February 1749 Mainz, Electorate of Mainz, Electoral Rhenish Circle, Holy Roman Empire
- Died: 9 April 1808 (aged 59) Bamberg, Kingdom of Bavaria, Confederation of the Rhine

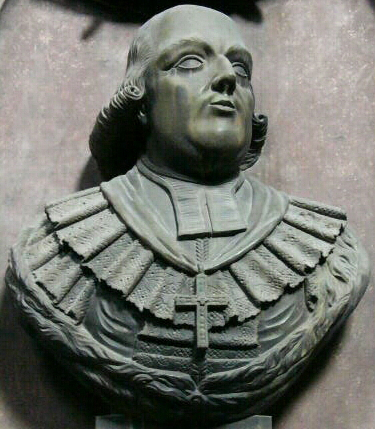
Epitaph in Würzburger Dom

Georg Karl Ignaz Freiherr von Fechenbach zu Laudenbach (20 February 1749 – 9 April 1808) was the last Prince-Bishop of Würzburg, holding office from 1795 until 1803, when the Prince-Bishopric of Würzburg was mediatised to the Electorate of Bavaria. He continued to serve as Bishop of Würzburg, though without temporal power, until his death. He was also Bishop of Bamberg from 1805 until his death.

Georg Karl Ignaz von Fechenbach zu Laudenbach was born in Mainz on 20 February 1749. He was ordained as a priest on 18 February 1779.

On 12 March 1795 the cathedral chapter of Würzburg Cathedral elected him to be the new Prince-Bishop of Würzburg, with Pope Pius VI confirming his appointment on 1 April 1795. He was consecrated as a bishop by Karl Theodor Anton Maria von Dalberg on 21 June 1795. On 26 March 1800 the cathedral chapter of Bamberg Cathedral elected him to be coadjutor bishop of the Prince-Bishopric of Bamberg.

The Treaty of Lunéville of 9 February 1801 decreed the secularization of the German prince-bishoprics. Bamberg was mediatised to the Electorate of Bavaria in 1802. The bishop fought bitterly to maintain his control of the Prince-Bishopric of Würzburg, but on 25 February 1803 the prince-bishopric was mediatised to the Electorate of Bavaria. He remained bishop, but no longer exercised temporal power in Würzburg. On 15 September 1805 the Bishop of Bamberg, Christoph Franz von Buseck, died, and Fechenbach succeeded as Bishop of Bamberg.

He died in Bamberg on 9 April 1808.

Catholic Church titles
Preceded by Franz Ludwig von Erthal	Prince-Bishop of Würzburg; 1795–1803	Succeeded by 1803: Mediatised to Bavaria
Preceded by Self (as prince-bishop)	Bishop of Würzburg; 1803–1808	Succeeded by Adam Friedrich Groß zu Trockau (from 1818)
Preceded by Christoph Franz von Buseck	Bishop of Bamberg; 1805–1808	Succeeded by Joseph von Stubenberg (from 1818)
