= Anselm Franz von Ingelheim (bishop of Würzburg) =

- Prince-Bishop of Würzburg
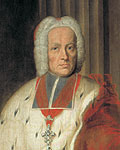
- Church: Catholic Church
- Diocese: Diocese of Würzburg
- In office: 28 November 1746 – 9 February 1749
- Predecessor: Friedrich Karl von Schönborn
- Successor: Karl Philipp von Greifenclau zu Vollraths

Orders
- Ordination: 31 December 1728
- Consecration: 27 August 1747 by Johann Bernhard Mayer

Personal details
- Born: 12 November 1683 Mainz, Electorate of Mainz, Electoral Rhenish Circle, Holy Roman Empire
- Died: 9 February 1749 (aged 65)

Anselm Franz of Ingelheim (12 November 1683 – 9 February 1749) was Bishop of Würzburg from 1746 until his death in 1749.

In contrast to his predecessor Friedrich Karl von Schönborn and his older brother and his predecessor in Würzburg, Johann Philipp Franz von Schönborn, Anselm Franz von Ingelheim supported the architect Balthasar Neumann very little. Neumann was dismissed as a senior postmaster, but he remained an officer. Ingelheim was considered to be greedy, and was said to have had only interest in goldsmithery and alchemy, so that the building of the Würzburg Residenz was stagnating. The Second Pentacle of Jupiter, from the Key of Solomon (Clavicula Salomonis) was reportedly found on his body, on the night of his death in 1749.

Catholic Church titles
Preceded by Friedrich Karl von Schönborn	Prince-Bishop of Würzburg; 1746–1749	Succeeded by Karl Philipp von Greifenclau zu Vollraths
