= Karl Philipp von Greifenclau zu Vollraths =

Karl Philipp Heinrich von Greifenclau zu Vollraths
- Prince-Bishop of Würzburg
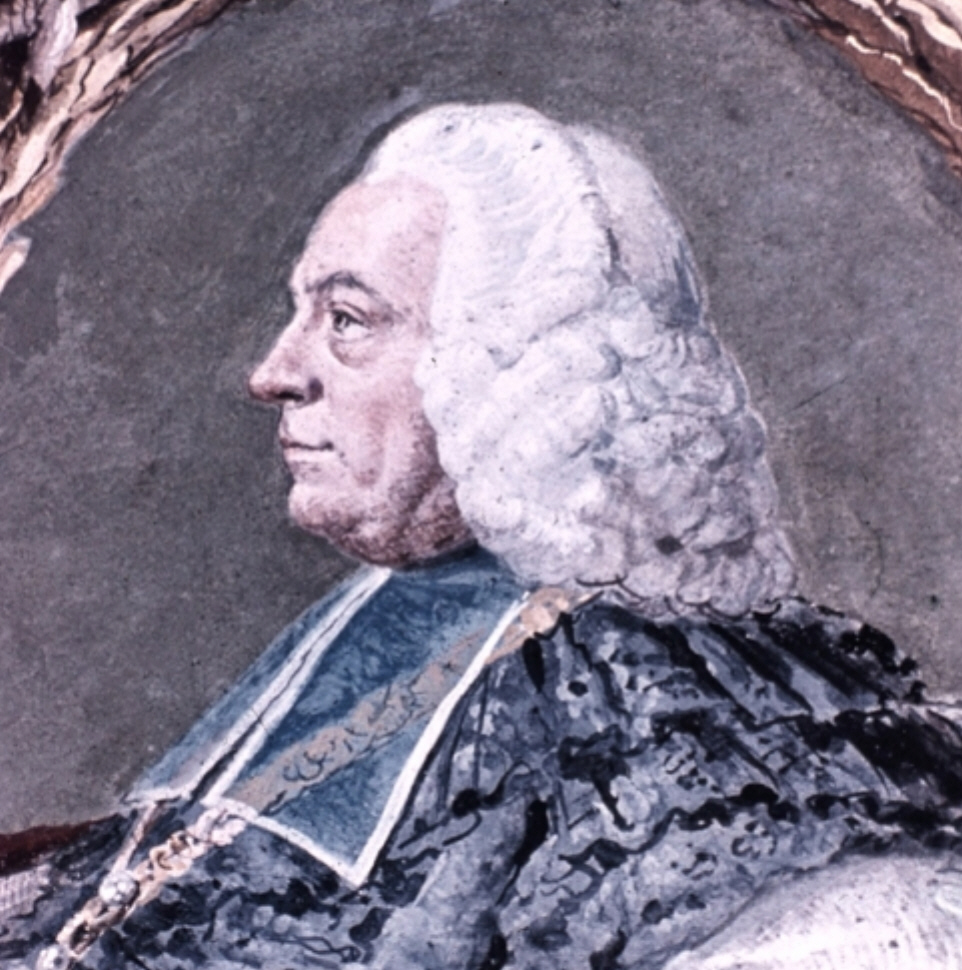
- Karl Philipp von Greiffenclau-Vollrads; Ceiling painting by Giovanni Battista Tiepolo in the Würzburg Residence
- Church: Catholic Church
- Diocese: Diocese of Würzburg
- In office: 21 July 1749 – 25 November 1754
- Predecessor: Anselm Franz von Ingelheim
- Successor: Adam Friedrich von Seinsheim

Orders
- Ordination: 30 May 1715
- Consecration: 5 October 1749 by Daniel Johann Anton von Gebsattel

Personal details
- Born: 1 December 1690 Vollrads, Electorate of Mainz, Electoral Rhenish Circle, Holy Roman Empire
- Died: 25 November 1754 (aged 63)

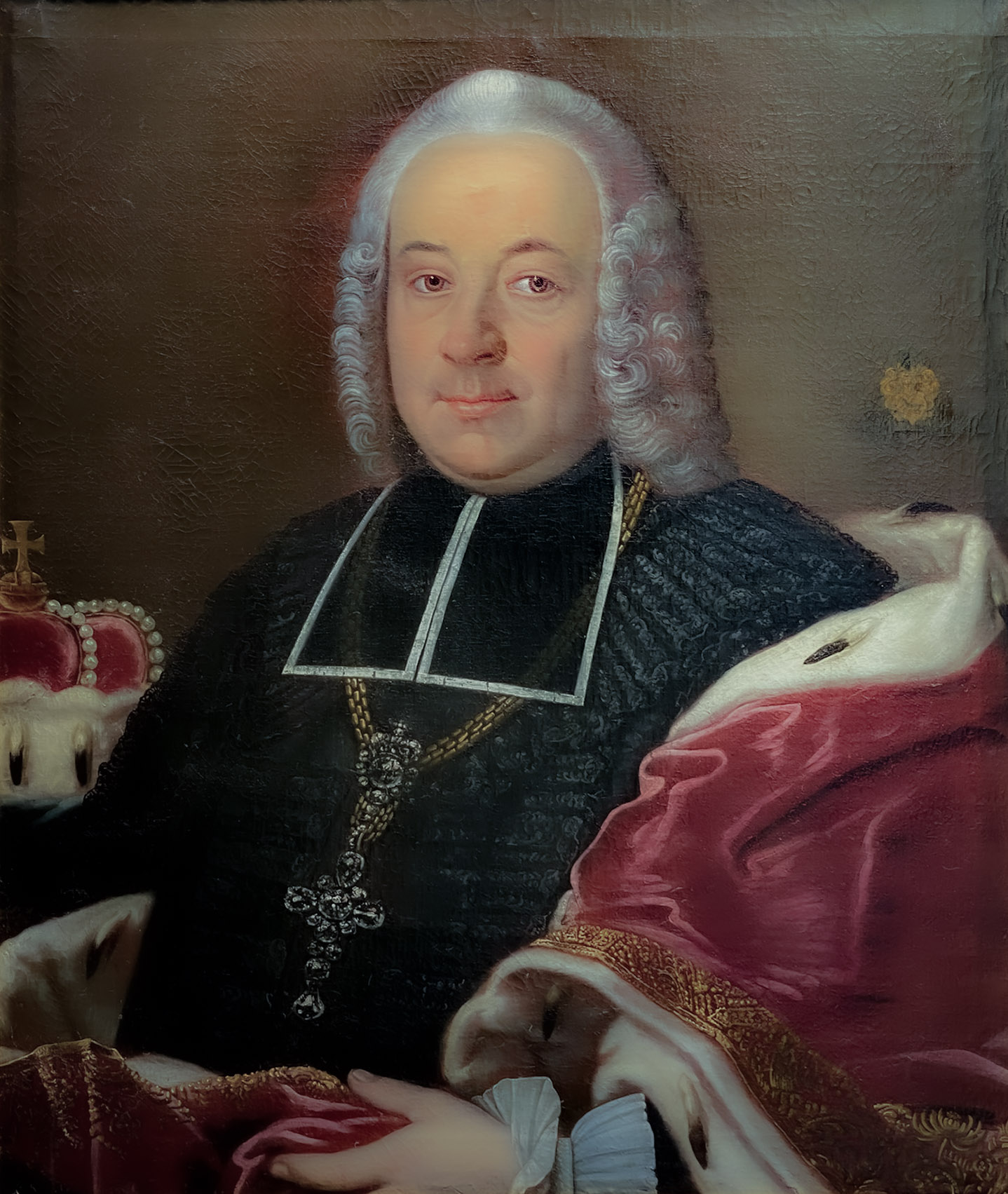
Karl Philipp von Greiffenclau zu Vollraths

Karl Philipp Freiherr von Greiffenclau zu Vollraths (sometimes also Greifenclau or Vollrads, 1 December 1690 – 25 November 1754) was the Prince-Bishop of Würzburg from 1749 to 1754.

== Biography ==
Karl Philipp von Greiffenclau zu Vollraths was born in Vollraths on 1 December 1690, the son of Johann Erwein von Greiffenclau (d. 1727) und Anna Lioba von Sickingen-Sickingen. His father's brother, Johann Philipp von Greifenclau zu Vollraths, was the Prince-Bishop of Würzburg from 1699 to 1719.

He was made a canon (Domizellar) of Würzburg Cathedral in 1705. He studied at the University of Mainz, before being ordained as a priest on 30 May 1728. He served as rector of the University of Mainz from 1739 to 1749.

On 14 April 1749 the cathedral chapter of Würzburg Cathedral elected him to be Prince-Bishop of Würzburg, with Pope Benedict XIV confirming his appointment on 21 July 1749. He was consecrated as a bishop by Daniel Johann Anton von Gebsattel, auxiliary bishop of Würzburg on 5 October 1749.

Karl Philipp von Greiffenclau resumed the Schönborn patronage in Würzburg, and immediately after his reign of government had begun, Balthasar Neumann was reappointed as director of the Würzburg Residence. In 1750, he commissioned Giovanni Battista Tiepolo to paint frescoes in the Residence.

He died of tuberculosis on 25 November 1754 and is buried in Würzburg Cathedral.

Catholic Church titles
Preceded by Anselm Franz von Ingelheim	Prince-Bishop of Würzburg; 1749–1754	Succeeded by Adam Friedrich von Seinsheim
