= Chapel of the Holy Cross =

Chapel of the Holy Cross is a chapel dedicated to the Christian Cross. Other names are Chapel of the Cross, Holy Cross chapel, and in German Heilig-Kreuz-Kapelle and Kreuzkapelle.

- Chapel of the Holy Cross (Montmajour), France
- Holy Cross chapel, Mattancherry, India

== Germany ==
- Heilig-Kreuz-Kapelle (Blieskastel), Saarland, Germany
- Kreuzkapelle, Bad Camberg, Hesse, Germany
- Kreuzkapelle, Kitzingen

== United States ==
- Chapel of the Cross (Mannsdale, Mississippi)
- Chapel of the Cross (Chapel Hill, North Carolina), at University of North Carolina, Chapel Hill
- Chapel of the Holy Cross (Sedona, Arizona)
- Chapel of the Holy Cross (Holderness, New Hampshire), at Holderness School
