= Balthasar Neumann =

German architect (1687-1753)

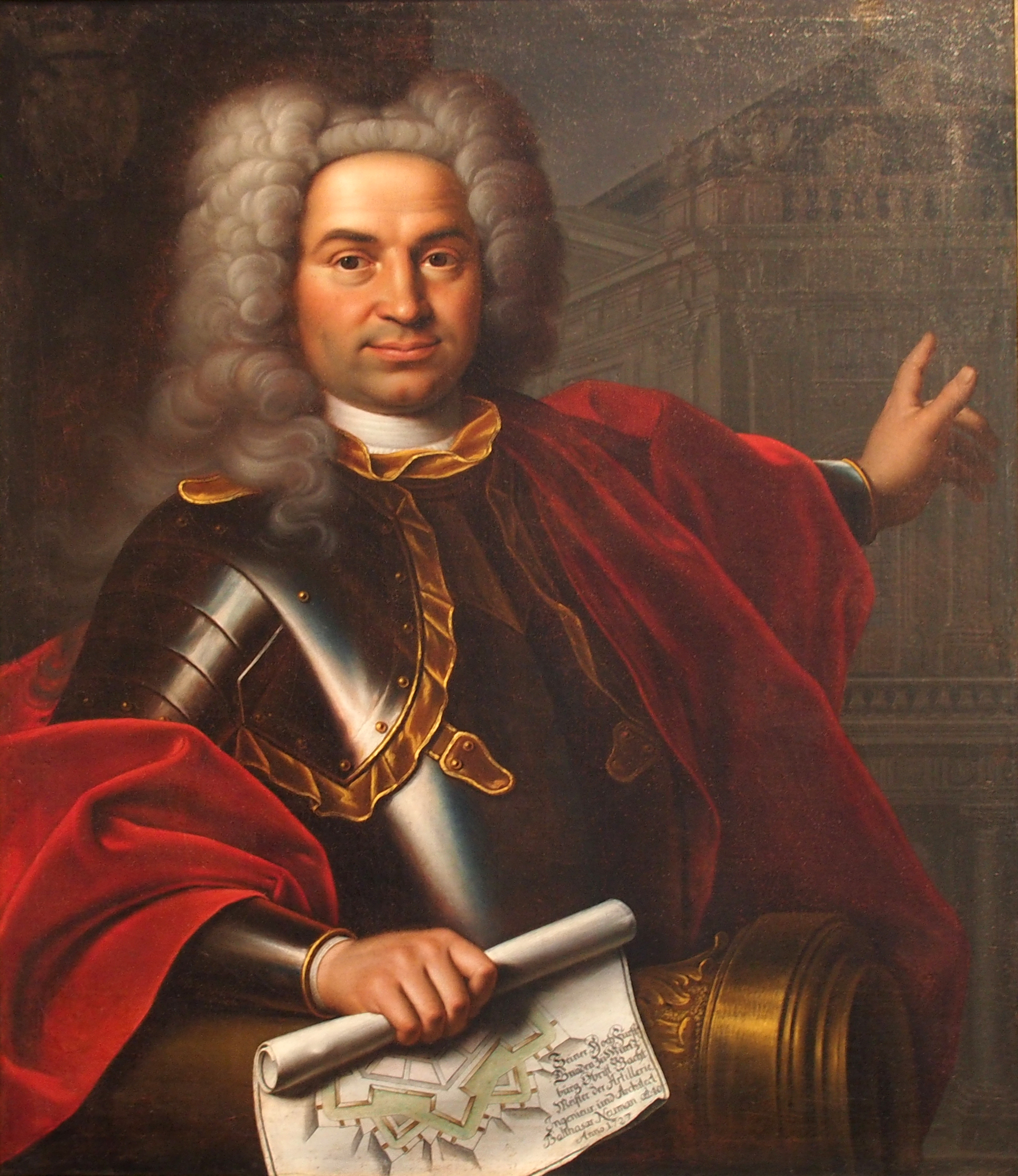
- Born: Johann Balthasar Neumann c. 27 January 1687; Eger, Bohemia, Holy Roman Empire (today Cheb, Czech Republic)
- Died: 19 August 1753 (aged 66); Würzburg, Prince-Bishopric of Würzburg, Holy Roman Empire
- Occupation: Architect
- Buildings: Würzburg Residence, Basilica of the Fourteen Holy Helpers

Johann Balthasar Neumann (c. 27 January 1687 – 19 August 1753), usually known as Balthasar Neumann, was a German architect and military engineer and one of the most important designers of late Baroque architecture in Central Europe. He developed a distinctive architectural style integrating Austrian, Bohemian, Italian, and French influences.

His most notable works include the Würzburg Residence, described by UNESCO as one of the most important palaces of the High Baroque period, and the Basilica of the Fourteen Holy Helpers (Vierzehnheiligen), widely regarded as a masterpiece of German Baroque architecture.

== Early life ==
Neumann is believed to have been born on 27 January 1687 in Eger, Kingdom of Bohemia (now Cheb, Czech Republic), the seventh of nine children of the cloth-maker Hans Christoph Neumann (d. 1713) and his wife Rosina (1645–1707). He was baptized on 30 January 1687.

He initially apprenticed at a bell and gun foundry in Eger. After travelling as a journeyman, he arrived in Würzburg in 1711. In 1712 he began studying geometry, architecture and land surveying, and entered military service in the Würzburg artillery, where he remained until his death, ultimately attaining the rank of colonel.

Among his early technical works were measurement instruments (1712, now in the Deutsches Museum, Munich; 1713, Mainfränkisches Museum, Würzburg), a map of Würzburg (1715; copy in the Bavarian War Archive, Munich), and drawings for a new abbey at Ebrach (1716, now lost).

In 1717 Neumann participated in the Austro–Turkish War, advancing with his unit from Vienna to Belgrade. In 1718 he travelled through northern Italy, studying architecture and briefly working on civilian construction projects in Milan.

== Early commissions ==
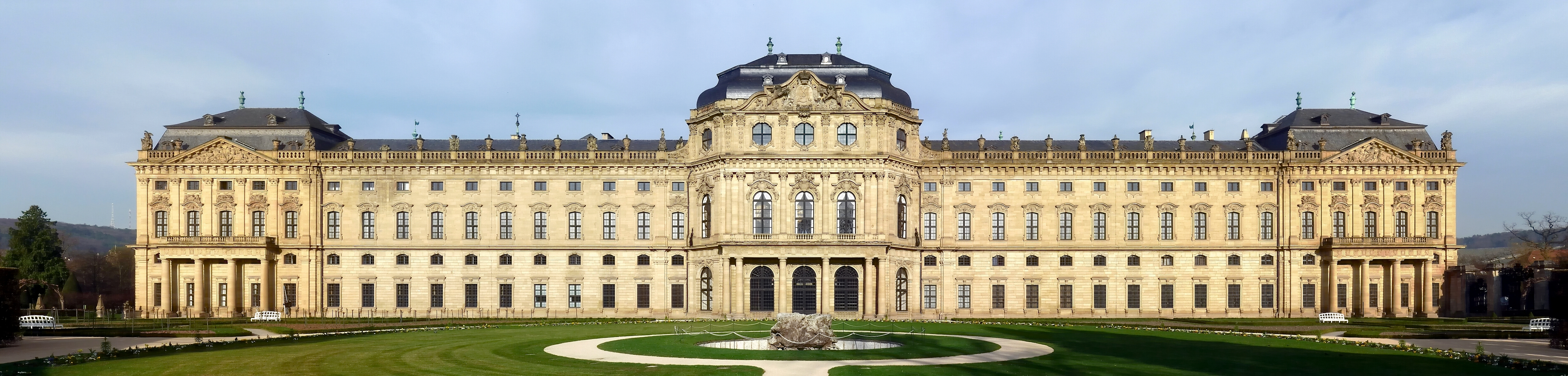
Neumann's Würzburg Residence and part of its Court Gardens

Neumann's career as an architect took off under Johann Philipp Franz von Schönborn, Prince-Bishop of Würzburg, who asked the young engineer in 1719 to plan, and in 1720 to lead construction of, his new palace, the Würzburg Residence. Although other architects participated, Neumann was able to give the project his personal imprint, which became his life's work.

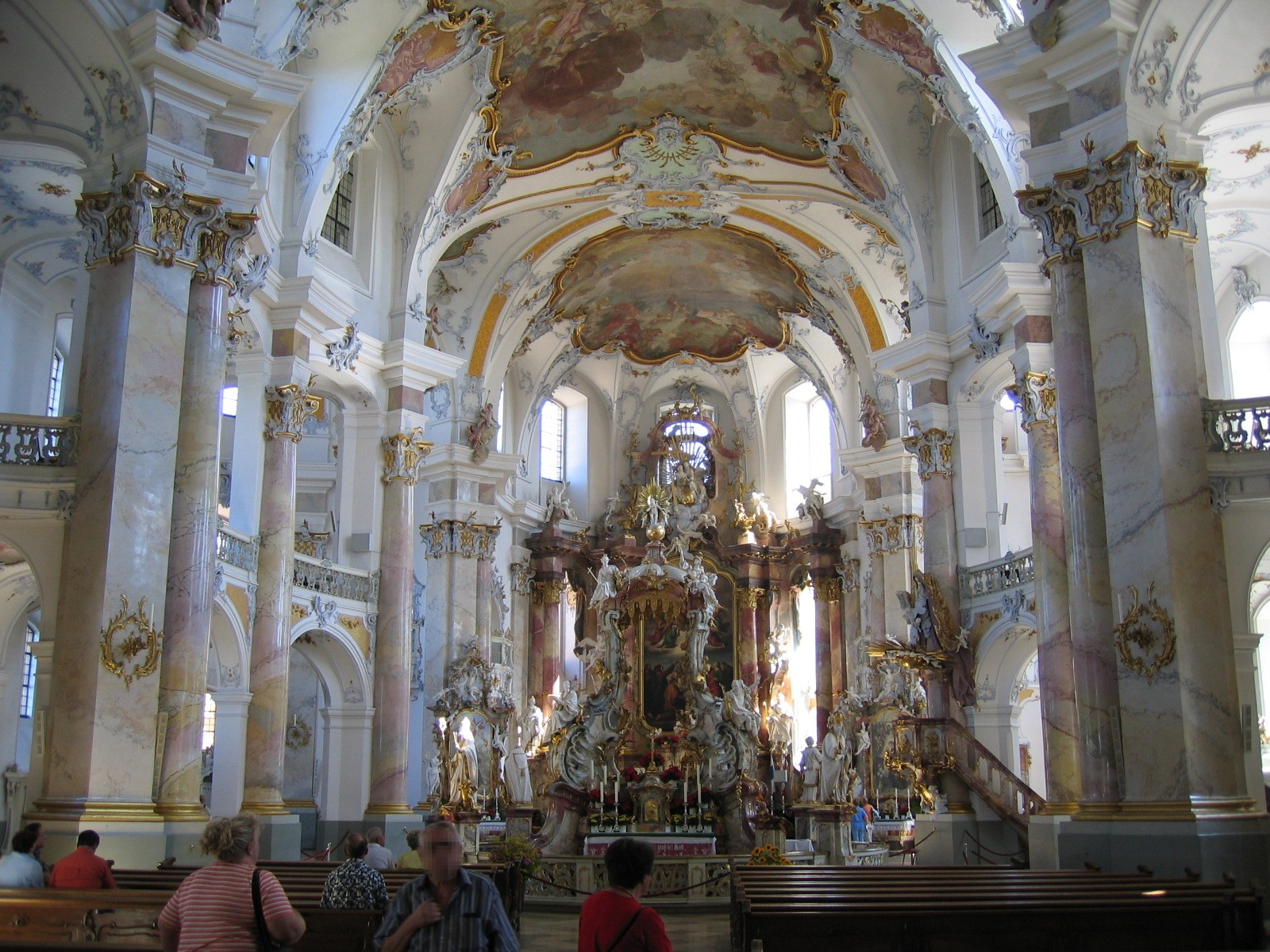
Interior of the Basilica of the Fourteen Holy Helpers

Neumann’s second major commission for the Prince-Bishop was the Schönborn Chapel (Schönbornkapelle) of Würzburg Cathedral, begun in 1721. In 1723 he travelled to France, where he studied contemporary architectural developments. In Paris and Versailles he met the royal architects Germain Boffrand and Robert de Cotte, consulting them on aspects of the Würzburg projects.

Upon returning to Würzburg, Neumann began construction of a hunting lodge known as Mädelhofen in 1724; the project remained unfinished and was demolished in 1725.

In 1725, Neumann married Maria Eva Engelberts (1704–1745). The couple had eight children, including three sons and five daughters.

== Patronage under the Schönborns ==
Under Prince-Bishop Christoph Franz von Hutten (1673–1729), Neumann received fewer commissions in Würzburg and increasingly worked for monastic patrons. His church at Münsterschwarzach Abbey (begun after 1727, demolished after 1821) marked an important stage in his development as a designer of ecclesiastical architecture.

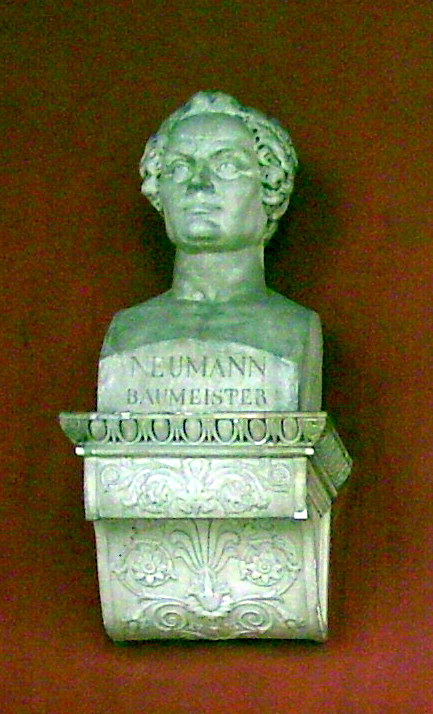
A Bust of Balthasar Neumann

Another significant project of this period was the church at Kloster Holzkirchen (1728–1730), in which Neumann combined elements of French spatial planning, Italian dynamism, and German Baroque structural traditions.

Friedrich Karl von Schönborn (1674–1746), who succeeded Hutten as Prince-Bishop and simultaneously served as Prince-Bishop of Bamberg, became Neumann’s principal patron. As Imperial Vice-Chancellor (Reichsvizekanzler), Schönborn resided at the imperial court in Vienna until 1734. He appointed Neumann director of all military, civil, and ecclesiastical construction in both bishoprics. In 1729 and 1730, Neumann was summoned to Vienna, where he exchanged views with Johann Lukas von Hildebrandt, Schönborn’s court architect. Hildebrandt’s influence is evident in aspects of the Würzburg Residence and in the hunting lodge at Werneck (begun after 1733).

As chief engineer of the joint Hochstifts, Neumann was responsible for overseeing fortifications, transport and water engineering and for improving urban planning in both practical and aesthetical terms. From 1731, he also taught military and civilian architecture at Würzburg University.

== Later commissions ==
Neumann also worked for Damian Hugo Philipp von Schönborn (1676–1743) and Franz Georg von Schönborn (1682–1756). For the former, Prince-Bishop of Speyer, he designed the Corps de Logis of Schloss Bruchsal (begun after 1731), notable for its monumental staircase. In Bruchsal he also designed the Church of St. Peter (1740–1746), intended as the burial church of the Prince-Bishops of Speyer.

For the Elector of Trier, Neumann designed the Dikasterialgebäude of Ehrenbreitstein Fortress (1739–1748) and the summer palace Schönbornslust at Kesselheim near Koblenz (1748–1752; demolished 1806).

These commissions brought him into contact with patrons in western Germany. Among several projected works, only the staircase and New Apartments of the Augustusburg Palace (from 1743) were executed. Plans prepared for the ducal palace in Stuttgart (after 1747), Schwetzingen Palace (1749), and the Karlsruhe Residence (after 1750) remained unrealised.

As a church architect, Neumann drew upon the work of Guarino Guarini, as well as the Bohemian architectural tradition transmitted to Franconia by Johann Dientzenhofer. He made frequent use of centralized and rotunda-based spatial compositions, a development that reached its fullest expression in the Basilica of the Fourteen Holy Helpers (Vierzehnheiligen, begun 1743) and the Abbey Church of Neresheim (begun 1747).

Among his final large-scale proposals was a redesign of the Hofburg Palace in Vienna (after 1746), which was not executed. Neumann also worked on St. Paulinus’ Church, designing much of its interior decorative program.

== Death and commemoration ==
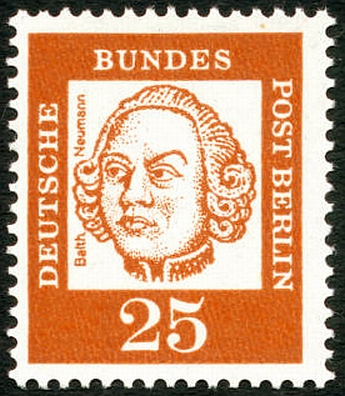
West Berlin Postage Stamp depicting Balthasar Neumann

Neumann died in Würzburg on 19 August 1753 and was buried in the Marienkapelle there.

He was commemorated on the final series of the German 50 Deutsche Mark banknote (issued 1991–2002), which featured his portrait alongside the grand staircase of the Würzburg Residence.

Neumann is also depicted in Giovanni Battista Tiepolo’s ceiling fresco above the staircase of the Würzburg Residence, shown in a pseudo-military uniform leaning over a cannon.

== Selected works ==
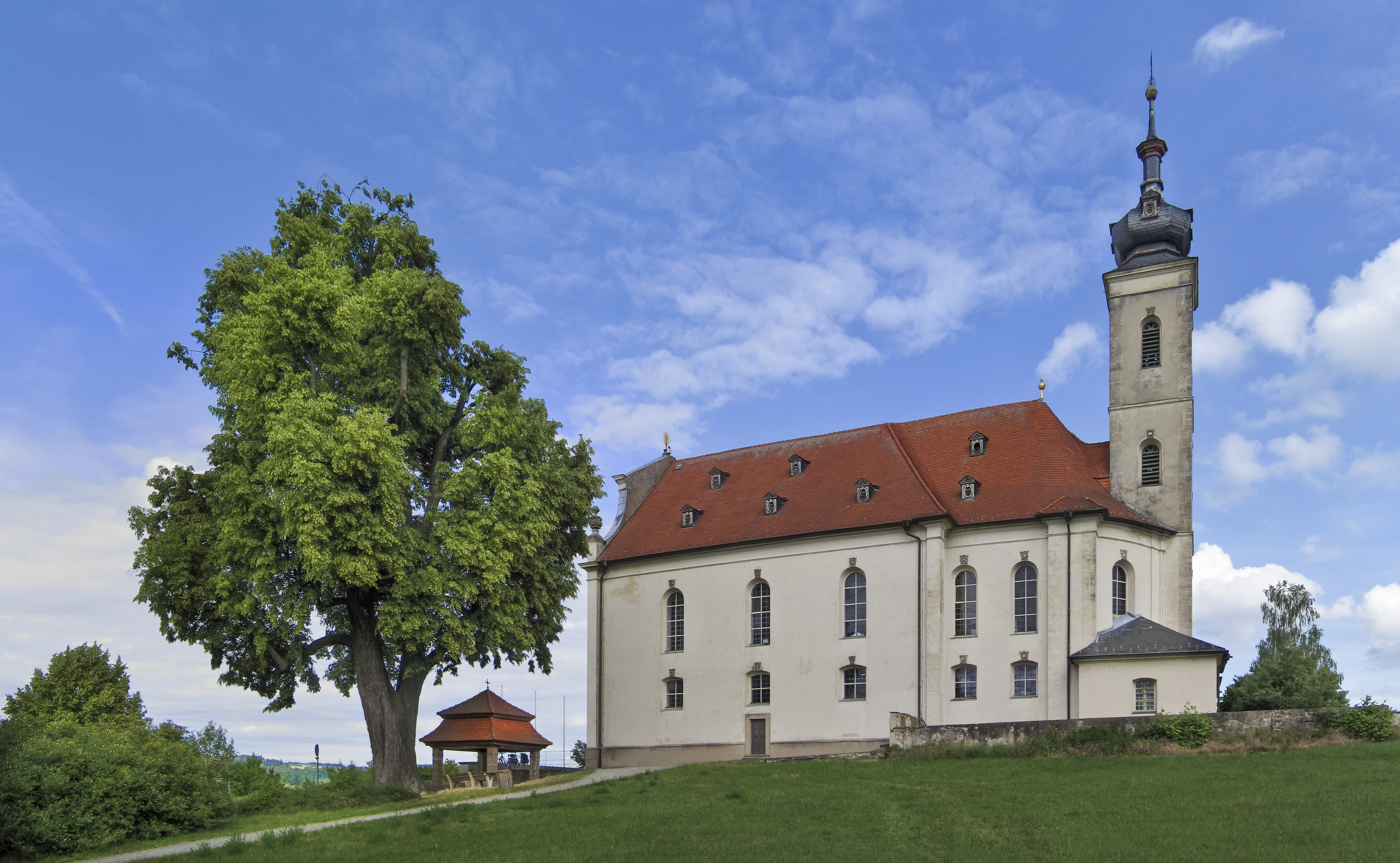
Pilgrimage Church of the Visitation at Maria Limbach, one of Neumann's final projects

=== Ecclesiastical architecture ===
- Pilgrimage church at Gößweinstein (Wallfahrtskirche), 1730–1739.
- Parish church at Heusenstamm, 1739–1744.
- Würzburg, Käppele (1748–1749).
- Kreuzkapelle, Kitzingen-Etwashausen (1741–1745).
- Jesuit Church, Mainz (1742–1746; demolished 1805).
- High altar, Worms Cathedral (1738–1740).
- Pilgrimage church at Maria Limbach (1751–1755), his final project.
- Augustinerkirche, Würzburg (1741–1744).

=== Secular and administrative buildings ===
- Propsteigebäude of the Augustinian Canons, Heidenfeld (1723–1733).
- Katharinenspital, Bamberg (1729–1738).
- Domkapitelhaus, Bamberg (1730–1733).
- Klerikalseminar, Bamberg (1731–1737).
- Orangery, Schloss Seehof (1733–1737).
- Geschäftshaus am Marktplatz, Würzburg (1739–1741).
- Abbey and convent buildings at Oberzell (1744–1760).
