= Adam Friedrich von Seinsheim =

Adam Friedrich August Anton Joseph Maria Graf von Seinsheim
- Prince-Bishop of Würzburg
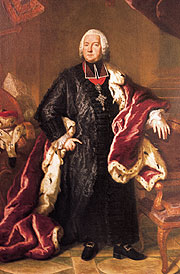
- Church: Catholic Church
- Diocese: Diocese of Würzburg
- In office: 17 March 1755 – 18 February 1779
- Predecessor: Karl Philipp von Greifenclau zu Vollraths
- Successor: Franz Ludwig von Erthal
- Other post: Bishop of Bamberg

Orders
- Ordination: 29 September 1753
- Consecration: 15 June 1755 by Franz Christoph von Hutten zum Stolzenberg

Personal details
- Born: 16 February 1708 Regensburg, Prince-Bishopric of Regensburg, Bavarian Circle, Holy Roman Empire
- Died: 18 February 1779 (aged 71) Würzburg, Prince-Bishopric of Würzburg, Franconian Circle, Holy Roman Empire

Adam Friedrich Graf von Seinsheim (16 February 1708 – 18 February 1779) was the Prince-Bishop of Würzburg from 1755 to 1779 and Prince-Bishop of Bamberg from 1757 to 1779.

Adam Friedrich von Seinsheim was born in Regensburg on 16 February 1708, the son of Maximilian Franz Graf von Seinsheim (1681-1739) and his wife Anna Philippina Gräfin von Schönborn (1685-1721). His mother was the sister of Franz Georg von Schönborn, Archbishop-Elector of Trier; Friedrich Karl von Schönborn, Prince-Bishop of Bamberg and Würzburg; and Damian Hugo Philipp von Schönborn, Prince-Bishop of Speyer.

He became a canon of Bamberg Cathedral and Würzburg Cathedral in 1718. He studied Christian theology at the University of Salzburg (master's degree 1724) and at the Collegium Germanicum 1725-27; and law at the University of Würzburg and Leiden University. In 1747, he became provost of the Church of St. Gangolf in Bamberg. He was ordained as a priest on 29 September 1753.

The cathedral chapter of Würzburg Cathedral unanimously elected him Prince-Bishop of Würzburg on 7 January 1755, with Pope Benedict XIV confirming his appointment on 17 March 1755. He was consecrated as a bishop by Cardinal Franz Christoph von Hutten zu Stolzenfels, Prince-Bishop of Speyer, on 15 June 1755. At the insistence of Francis I, Holy Roman Emperor, he was elected Prince-Bishop of Bamberg on 21 April 1757, thus creating a personal union between the Prince-Bishopric of Würzburg and the Prince-Bishopric of Bamberg. The pope confirmed this appointment on 23 May 1757.

Adam Friedrich von Seinsheim supported the imperial side during the Seven Years' War. Troops from the Kingdom of Prussia invaded both bishoprics during the course of this war.

He died of pneumonia in Würzburg on 18 February 1779 and is buried there.

Catholic Church titles
Preceded by Karl Philipp von Greifenclau zu Vollraths	Prince-Bishop of Würzburg; 1755–1779	Succeeded by Franz Ludwig von Erthal
Preceded by Franz Konrad von Stadion und Thannhausen	Prince-Bishop of Bamberg; 1757–1779	Succeeded by Franz Ludwig von Erthal
