= Marienberg Fortress =

Cultural heritage monument in Würzburg, Bavaria

- Festung Marienberg
- Near Würzburg, Germany
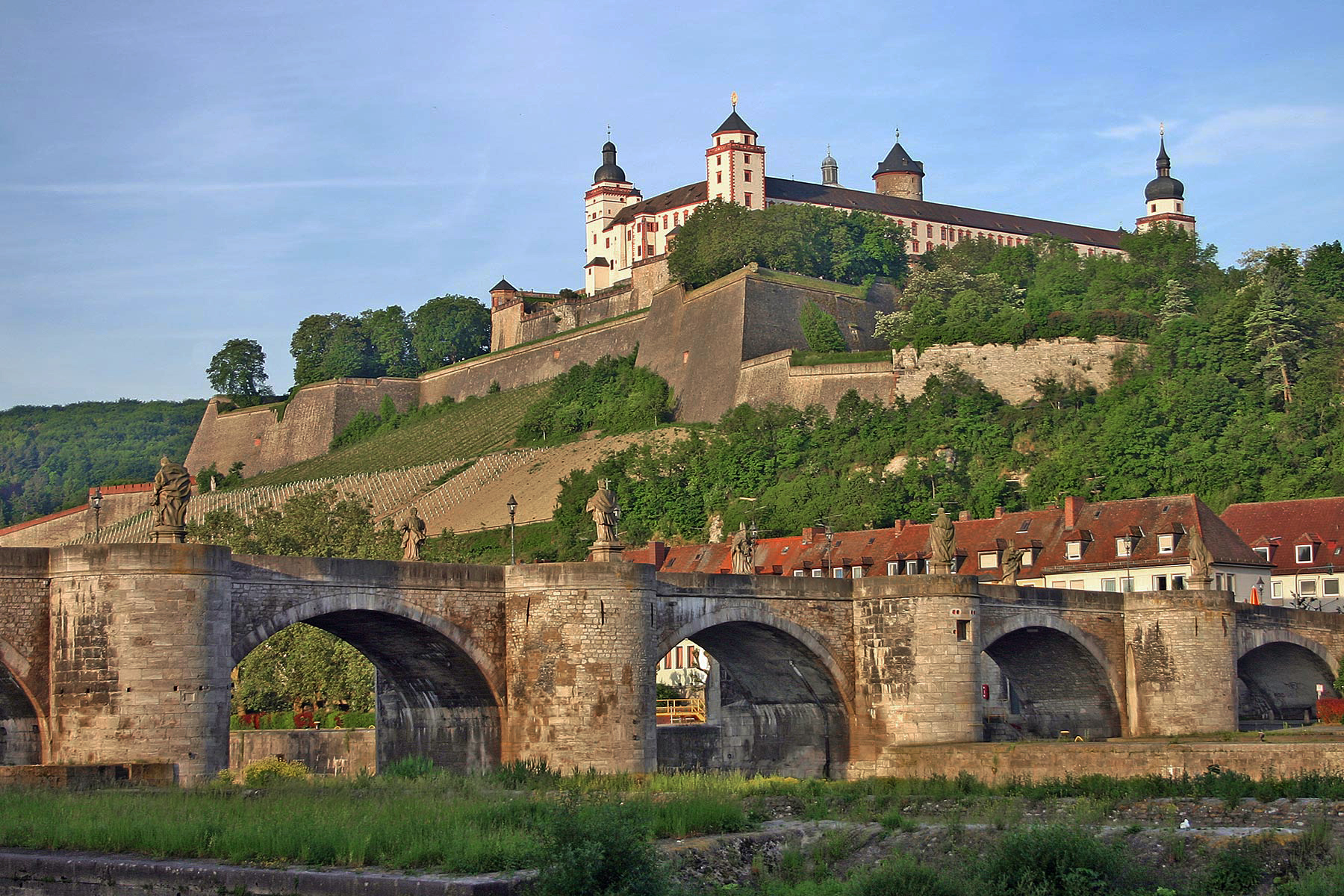
- Fortress Marienberg and the Old Bridge

Site information
- Type: Fortress
- Owner: Bavarian Administration of State-Owned Palaces, Gardens and Lakes
- Open to the public: Yes

Location
- Coordinates: 49.789722°N 9.921389°E

Site history
- Built: mostly 13th to 18th century
- Built by: Bishops of Würzburg

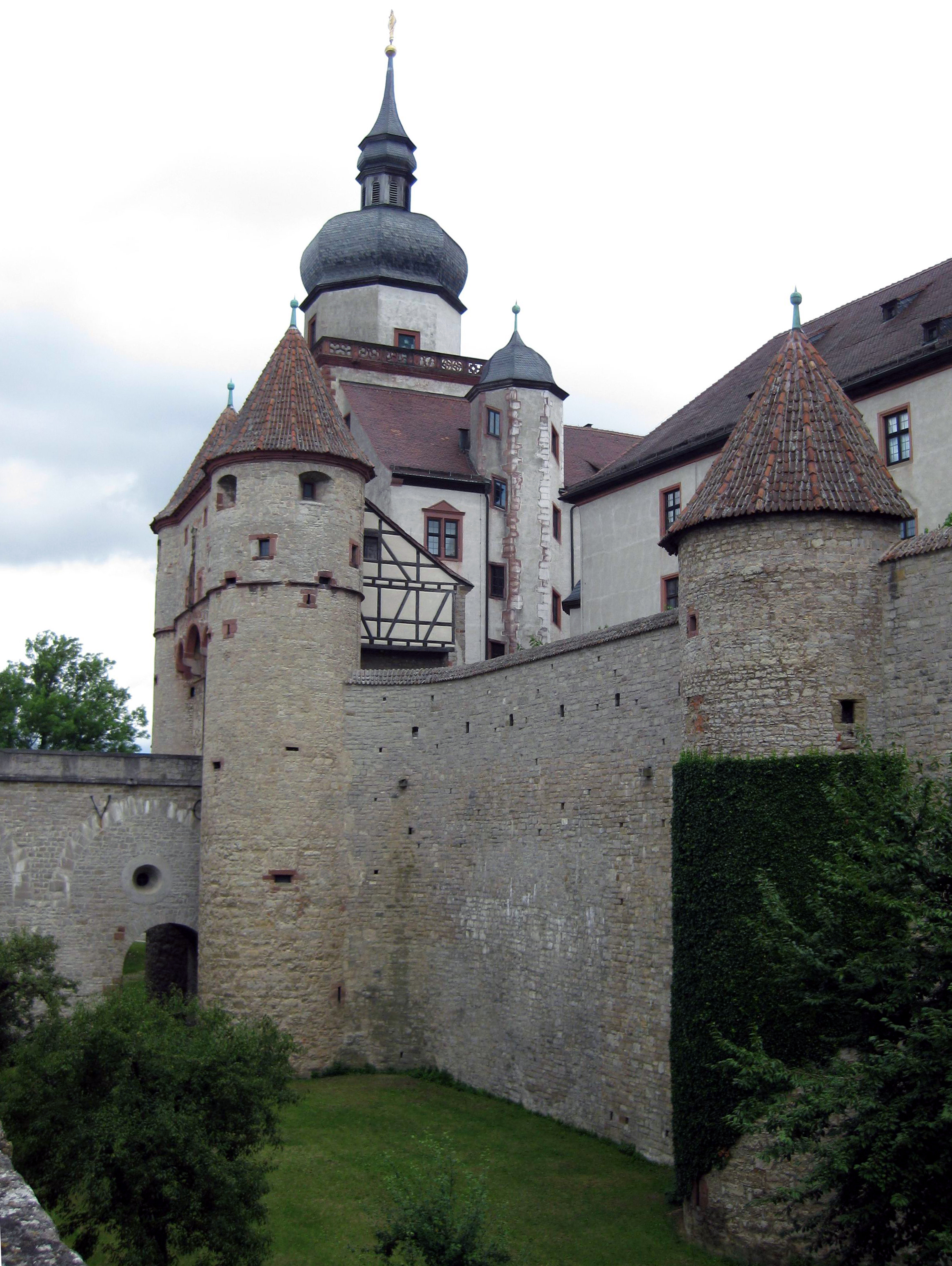
Scherenbergtor and medieval wall with the Kiliansturm in the background

Marienberg Fortress (German: Festung Marienberg) is a prominent landmark on the left bank of the Main river in Würzburg, in the Franconia region of Bavaria, Germany. It is a symbol of Würzburg and served as a home of the local prince-bishops for nearly five centuries. It has been a fort since ancient times, although most of the current structures were built in Renaissance and Baroque styles between the 16th and 18th centuries. After Gustavus Adolphus of Sweden conquered the area in 1631 during the Thirty Years' War, the castle was reconstructed as a Baroque residence. After it ceased to serve as residence of the Bishops of Würzburg, the fortress saw repeated action in the wars of the late 18th and 19th centuries. It was severely damaged by British bombs in March 1945 and only fully rebuilt in 1990. Today, it houses two museums.

== Geography ==
The fortress is located on a prominent spur of the 266-metre-high (873 ft) Marienberg, which rises about 100 metres over the Main river on the opposite side of the city of Würzburg. On the slopes around the castle are vineyards.

== History ==
=== Prehistory and Middle-Ages ===
Around 1000 BC, a Celtic refuge castle was built on the site by members of the Urnfield culture. Archaeological findings indicate that the locals of the later Hallstatt culture had trade contacts with Ancient Greece and that the hill marked an extreme northern point on the wine trade network of the time circa 500 BC. The hill may have been a Fürstensitz, the seat of a "prince".

From 100 AD onwards, control of the area changed hands several times between different "tribes" (Suevi, Marcomanni, Allemanni and Burgundians), before the area was taken by the Franks in the 6th century. Würzburg became the occasional seat of a Franconian-Thuringian duke under the Merovingians. His court resided on the right bank of the Main, however. In the 7th century, a written document mentioned Uburzi (which later became Virteburch and then "Würzburg"), referring to the fortification on the hill. The name Marienberg was in use only from high medieval times onward. After missionary work in the area led by Saint Kilian in the late 7th century, in the early 8th century, the Franks under Duke Hedan II constructed a chapel dedicated to the Virgin Mary and a fortification (earth ramparts and half-timbered houses) on the hill. The chapel – probably built at the site of a former pagan holy site dedicated to a mother goddess – and later churches that replaced it, was the reason why the hill and fortress eventually became known as Marienberg ("Mary's Mount"). This was probably the first Christian church built of stone north of the Alps outside of the territory formerly controlled by Rome (i.e. east of the Rhine and on the far side of the Limes).

Saint Boniface came to Franconia in 719, by which time there was no longer a duke at Würzburg, and some of the local clergy practiced pagan customs. Boniface appointed his follower Saint Burchard as the first Bishop of Würzburg in 741. Saint Mary's Church (explicitly mentioned in a document from 822) became the See's cathedral. Over the next decades, the town of Würzburg began to grow and in 788 the hill-top church lost the role of cathedral to a predecessor of Würzburg Cathedral (except for a brief interlude after the latter was destroyed in a fire in 855). At that point, the remains of Saint Kilian, Saint Colman and Saint Totnan were moved from Saint Mary's to be reinterred at the new cathedral. However, Saint Mary's continued to serve as the burial site for the intestines of the Prince-Bishops. Their bodies were buried in the cathedral, their hearts until 1573 at Ebrach Abbey.

No mention is made of any fortification on Marienberg until, in the 13th century, the Prince-Bishops of Würzburg moved their residence to Marienberg. Beginning around 1200, medieval fortifications were constructed on the hill. Under Bishop Konrad von Querfurt, Saint Mary's became the court chapel of the See. He and Bishop Hermann von Lobdeburg built what is today known as the Bergfried and the first palas. Lobdeburg used the castle as a temporary residence in 1242. After relations between the bishop and the people of the town – who supported the Emperor against their bishop – deteriorated in 1253, he moved his court permanently to the fortress. His successors remained there until the 18th century. Relations between bishop and town were fraught and the main reason for keeping an armed contingent stationed in the fortress. After 1308, the palas was enlarged under Bishop Andreas von Gundelfingen with construction paid for by the townspeople to compensate their liege lord for a riot that year. Since access to water was at a premium on the hill and earlier attempts to link the fortress to a spring at Höchberg were less than satisfactory, the Tiefer Brunnen ("deep well", going down 100 metres) was dug inside the fortress. The reign of Bishop Otto II. von Wolfskeel saw the construction of an additional ring of fortifications. In 1373, the burghers of Würzburg attacked the fortress with catapults whilst the fortress fired back with blackpowder weapons, the first documented use of guns in Würzburg. The first half of the 15th century saw a decline of the Hochstift and construction on the fortress mostly ceased. Only after 1466, under Bishop Rudolf von Scherenberg, were more fortifications and the Scherenbergtor added, as well as some towers and outbuildings.

=== Modern era ===
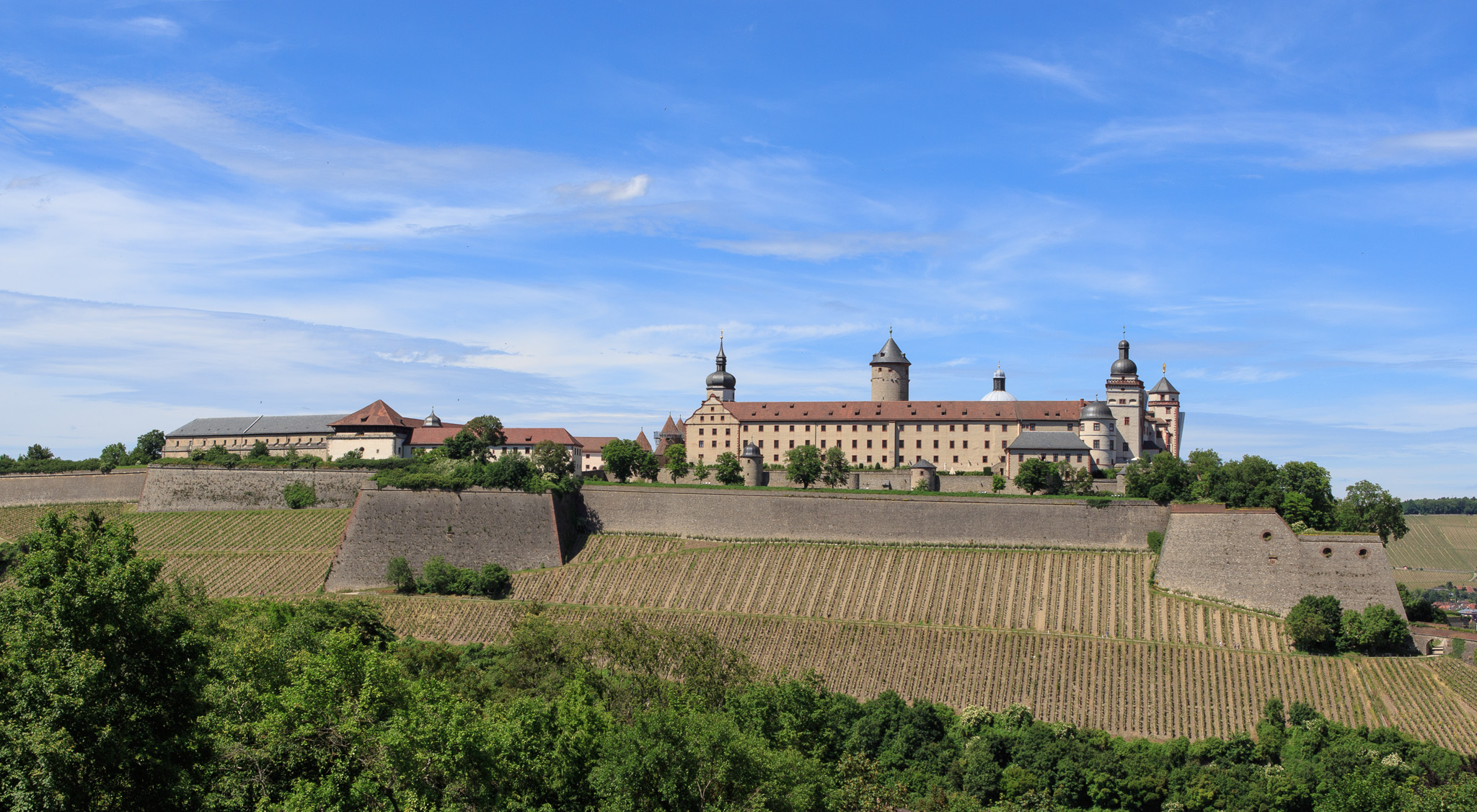
Festung Marienberg rises above vineyards

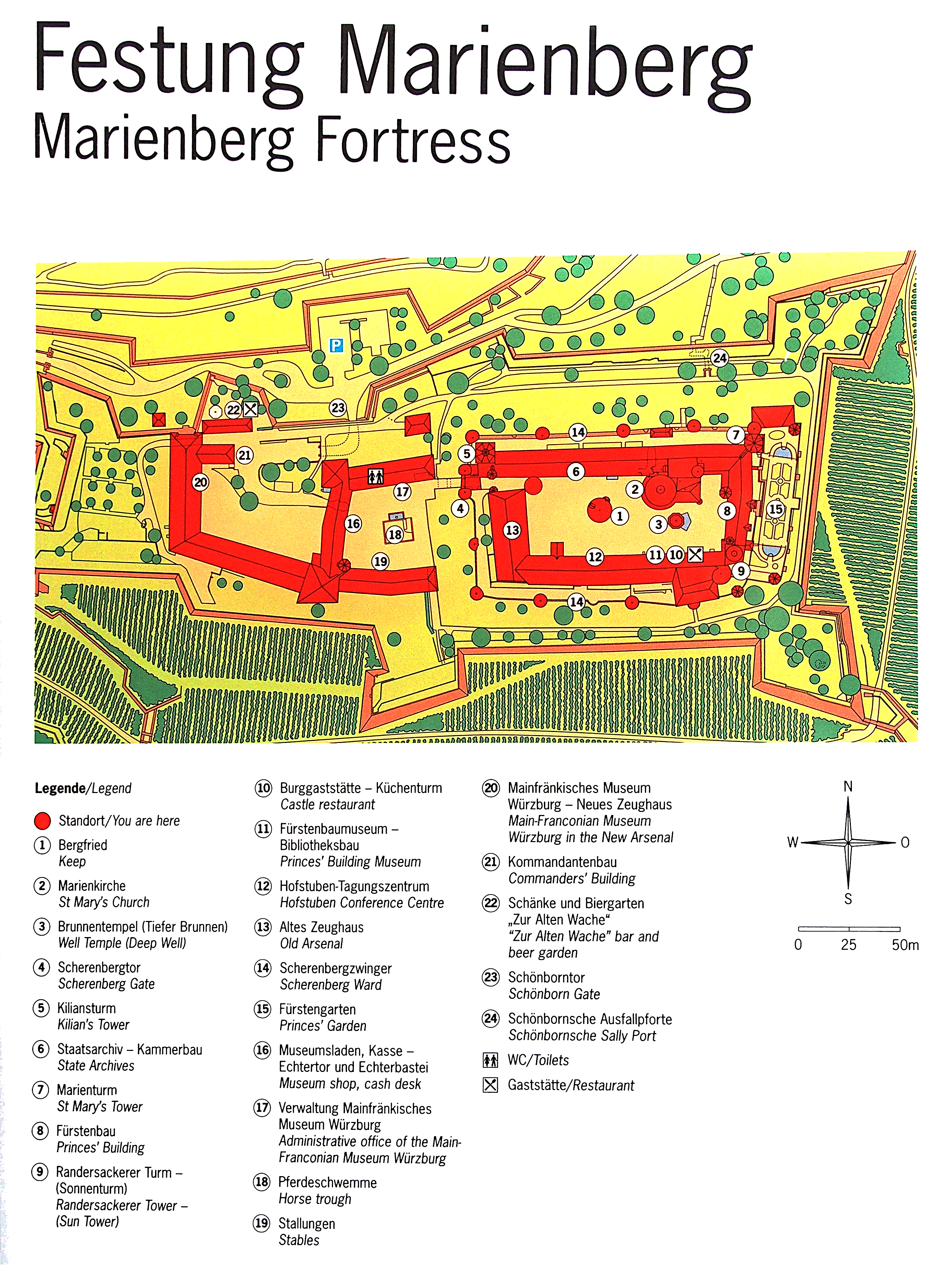
Map of Festung Marienberg

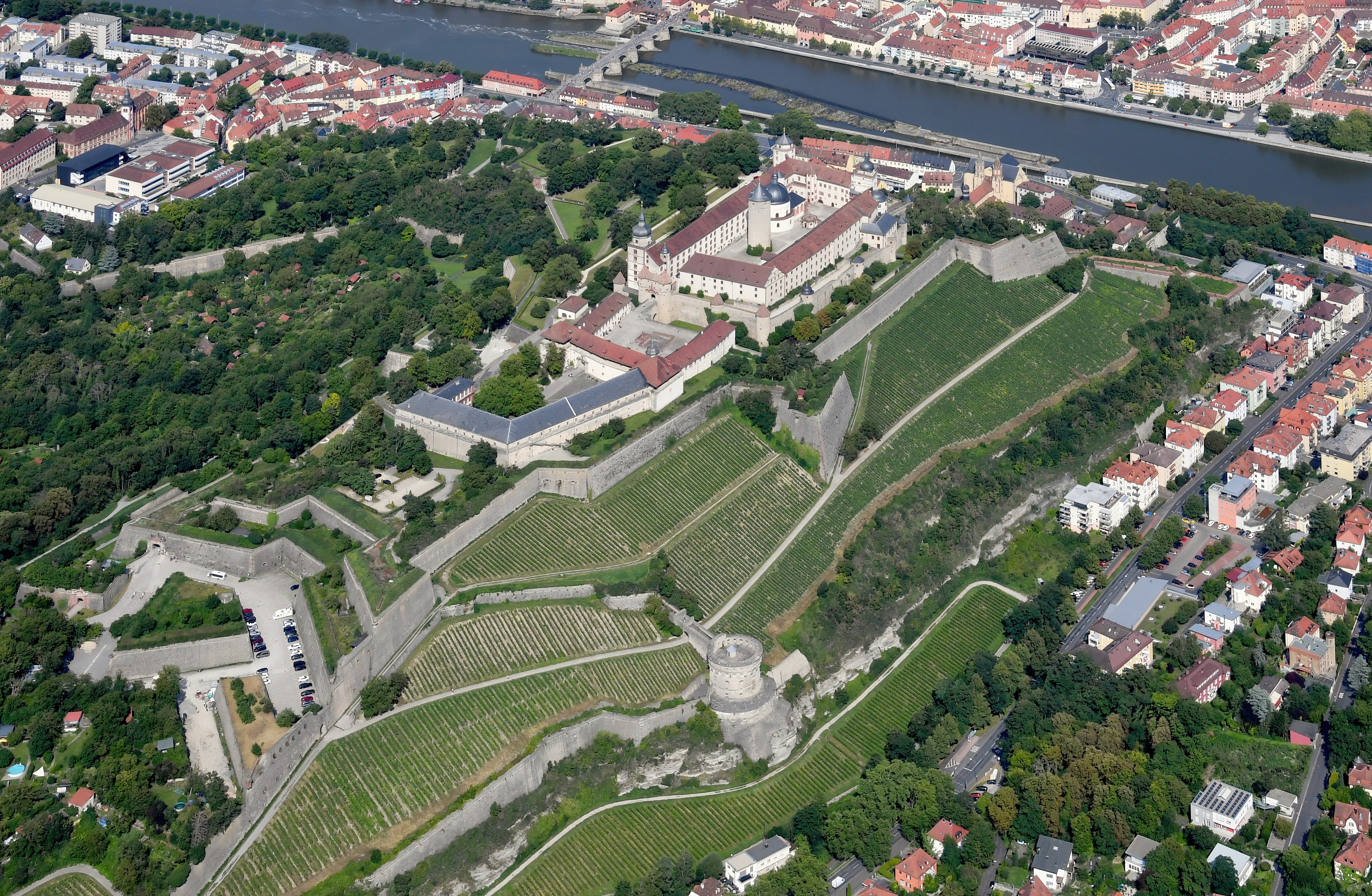
Aerial view of the Marienberg Fortress

Bishop Lorenz von Bibra had the fortress rebuilt as a Renaissance residence and added fortifications after 1495.

In 1525, during the German Peasants' War (Bauernkrieg), the fortress successfully withstood a siege by peasants led by Götz von Berlichingen. In May of that year, a peasant army of 15,000 men surrounded the fortification, but could not penetrate the concentric walls. By this time the ruling Prince-Bishop Konrad II of Thüngen had already fled the fortress. The defence was commanded by the knight Sebastian von Rotenhan and Frederick I, Margrave of Brandenburg-Ansbach. When their political leader, Florian Geyer, went to Rothenburg ob der Tauber in early June to procure the heavy guns needed to attempt to breach the walls, the leaderless peasant army camped around the castle was outflanked by the professional army of the Swabian League. In the ensuing battle, more than 8,000 peasants were killed. Bishop Konrad von Thüngen was able to return to his fortress, from which he had earlier fled. Also that year, sculptor Tilman Riemenschneider was imprisoned in the fortress and tortured along with the other members of Würzburg's city council, as punishment for allying themselves with the peasants.

Bishop Julius Echter von Mespelbrunn took office in 1573. He again reconstructed the fortress and further increased the size of the fortifications, after a fire in 1572 had damaged much of the medieval castle. Under his reign, the transformation of the fortress into a Renaissance residence was completed. In 1600, a fire destroyed the north wing of the main building and damaged some of the towers and the chapel. By 1607, the northern part of the fortress had been rebuilt. The goal was a rectangular four-wing palace, with towers at the corners, in accordance with the fashion of the time. However, the fourth tower was never built. Echter also had the chapel rebuilt and added a new well house.

In 1631, after some days of fighting the fortress was taken by Swedish forces under Gustav II Adolf of Sweden in the Thirty Years' War. Swedish troops plundered the fortress. Most of the well-known library was carried off to Uppsala. The fortress was held by the Swedish and their allies until 1635. Bernard of Saxe-Weimar had been appointed Duke of Franconia. In 1635, Bishop Franz von Hatzfeld was able to return to Würzburg.

After 1642, the princely residence was completely rebuilt and redesigned under Bishop Johann Philipp von Schönborn. In 1648, the fortress became a Reichsfestung and its fortifications were again increased considerably over the next decades.

After 1708, the palas (Fürstenhaus) and church were redesigned in Baroque style. The fortifications achieved their current form with the addition of a number of outer works to the southeast (Höllenschlund) in 1711–1715. In 1712, Charles VI was received by the Prince-Bishop at the castle, the last time a Holy Roman Emperor visited the fortress. Shortly thereafter, in 1719/20 the court of the Bishops moved into a palace on the other side of the Main river which was later replaced by today's Würzburg Residence. Marienberg now became just a military structure. Work on the last tower to be built (Maschikuliturm) began in 1724.

The fortress saw repeated action during the wars of 1795–1815. In 1796, during the War of the First Coalition, the well-stocked fortress was handed over by its garrison to the French. In 1800/01, however, it was successfully defended against a new French attack by Imperial General Dall'Aglio during the War of the Second Coalition. In 1803, the fortress was occupied by troops of the Electorate of Bavaria after the Bishopric of Würzburg was secularized. From 1805 to 1814, Marienberg was a fortress of the Grand Duchy of Würzburg, part of the Confederation of the Rhine, the puppet state of the First French Empire. In 1813/14, French troops tenaciously defended the fortress against coalition forces. The French Emperor Napoleon visited the fortress in 1806, in 1812 before the Russian campaign, and twice in 1813.

In 1814, Fortress Marienberg passed to the Kingdom of Bavaria. The Prussians under Edwin Freiherr von Manteuffel bombarded the fortress from the south in 1866 during the Austro-Prussian War. Marienberg lost its official status as "fortress" in 1867. During the Franco-Prussian War of 1870/71 it was used as a garrison and prison camp. Due to disuse, by 1900 the fortress had fallen into disrepair.

From 1914 to 1918, during World War I, the fortress served as barracks for artillery. During the German revolution, revolutionaries seized control of the fortress in 1918 but it was retaken by government troops. After the war, the Fürstenbau served as a barracks for the Landespolizei (state police), as a military depot and as an emergency accommodation (100 apartments). In 1935, the Bavarian Administration of State-Owned Palaces, Gardens and Lakes became the owner of the fortress and began its restoration.

Towards the end of World War II, the Echterbastei served as a medical depot and then as a depository of cultural treasures. During the bombing of Würzburg by the Royal Air Force on 16 March 1945, significant parts of the fortress were destroyed by fire caused by incendiary bombs. Reconstruction commenced after 1950 and was finished only in 1990.

== Architecture ==
Given the repeated destruction of the fortress' structures over the centuries, most recently and significantly in the bombing of 1945, many of the edifices visible today have been reconstructed to a lesser or greater extent. References in the following to a specific period thus do not necessarily imply that the substance of the extant structure dates to that period—it may have been rebuilt in the period's style.

=== Inner court ===
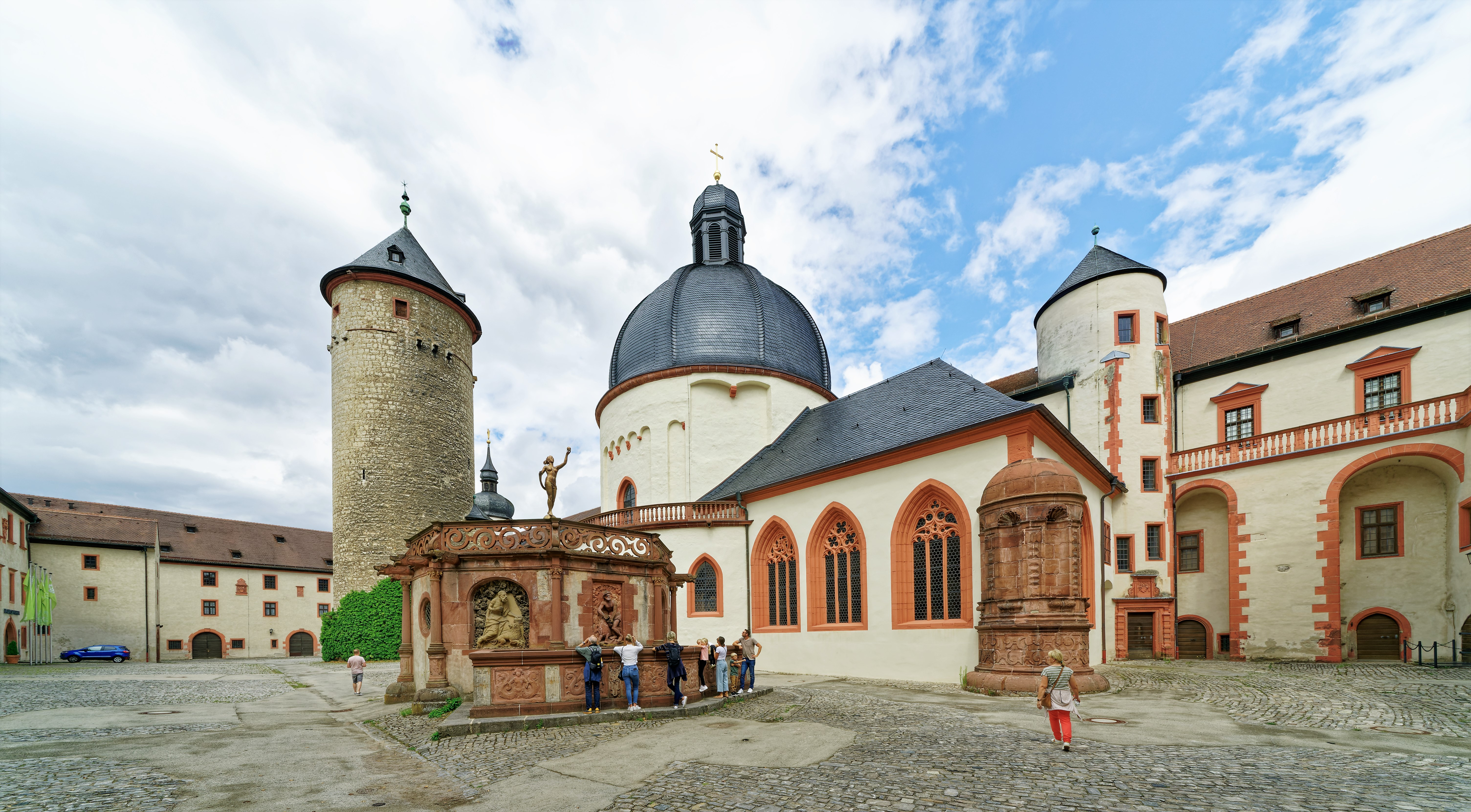
Inner court with Bergfried, well house and Marienkirche

The inner court features the free-standing Romanesque 13th century Bergfried (keep), the Renaissance well house from 1603 and the Marienkirche (or St Mary's Church). The Bergfried was originally known as Mittlerer Turm or Wartturm; the actual keep of the fortress was the predecessor of today's Kilianstum. The church's foundations go back to the 8th century, but the structure has seen repeated alterations over the centuries. While the basic form of two cylinders placed on top of each other remains, the building's proportions were changed in the 13th century and the size of the windows increased. The domed roof and the Echterchor were added by Bishop Echter. The interior also mostly dates to his reign, and reflects the Renaissance style with first indications of the coming Baroque period. The altars inside are Baroque.

=== Fürstenbau ===
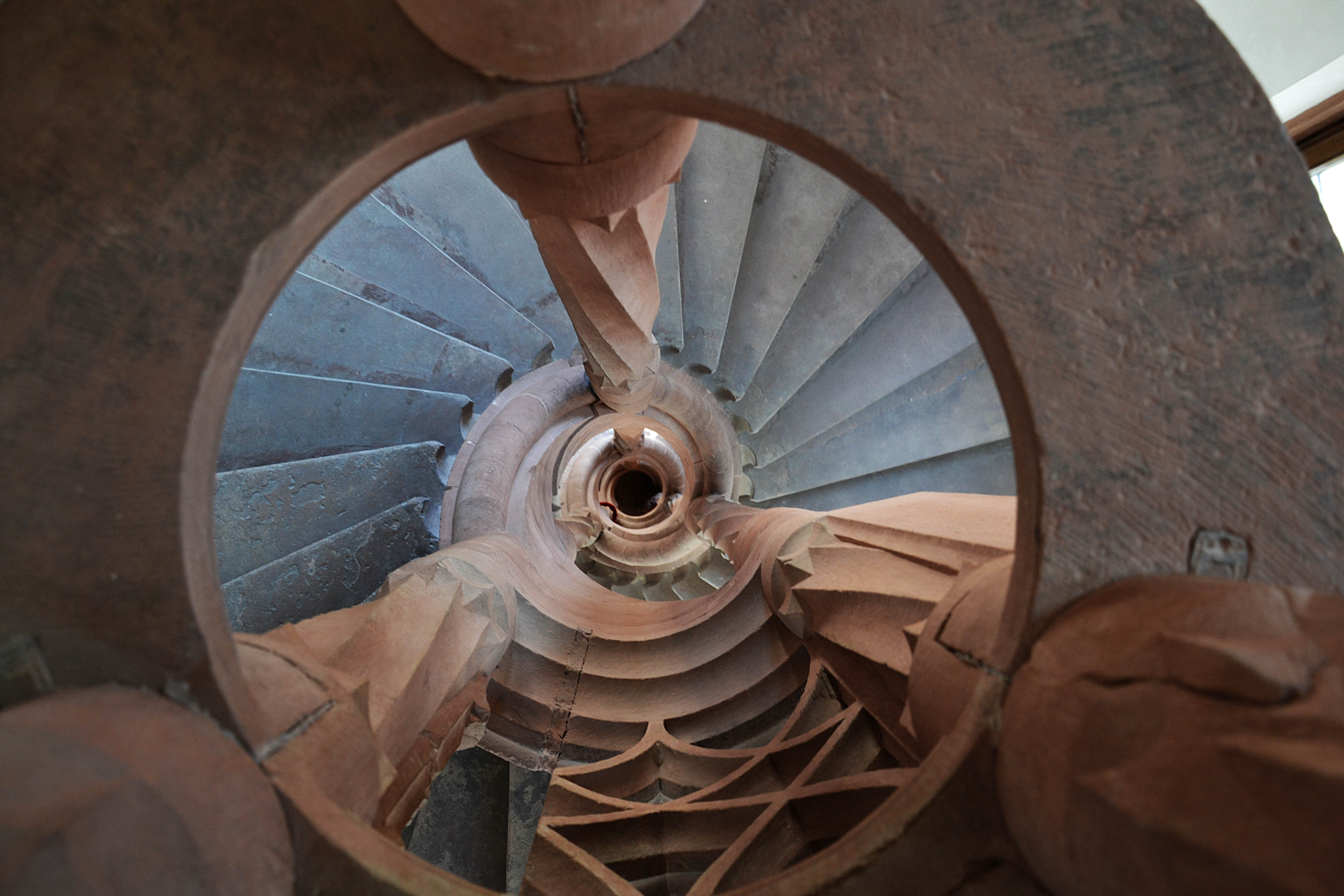
Bibra Treppe within the Bibra Tower, Fürstenbau

Surrounding the inner court is the four-wing Fürstenbau. Three of its four corners are marked by towers named (clockwise from the northwest) Kiliansturm, Marienturm and Randersackererturm. These mostly date to the rebuilding of the castle in the early 17th century. The Fürstenbau itself mostly reflects later 16th/17th century architecture and design but also features the Bibra Treppe (stairway) built in 1511. In the great hall (Fürstensaal) some 13th-century structures have been revealed.

=== Fortifications and Vorburg ===
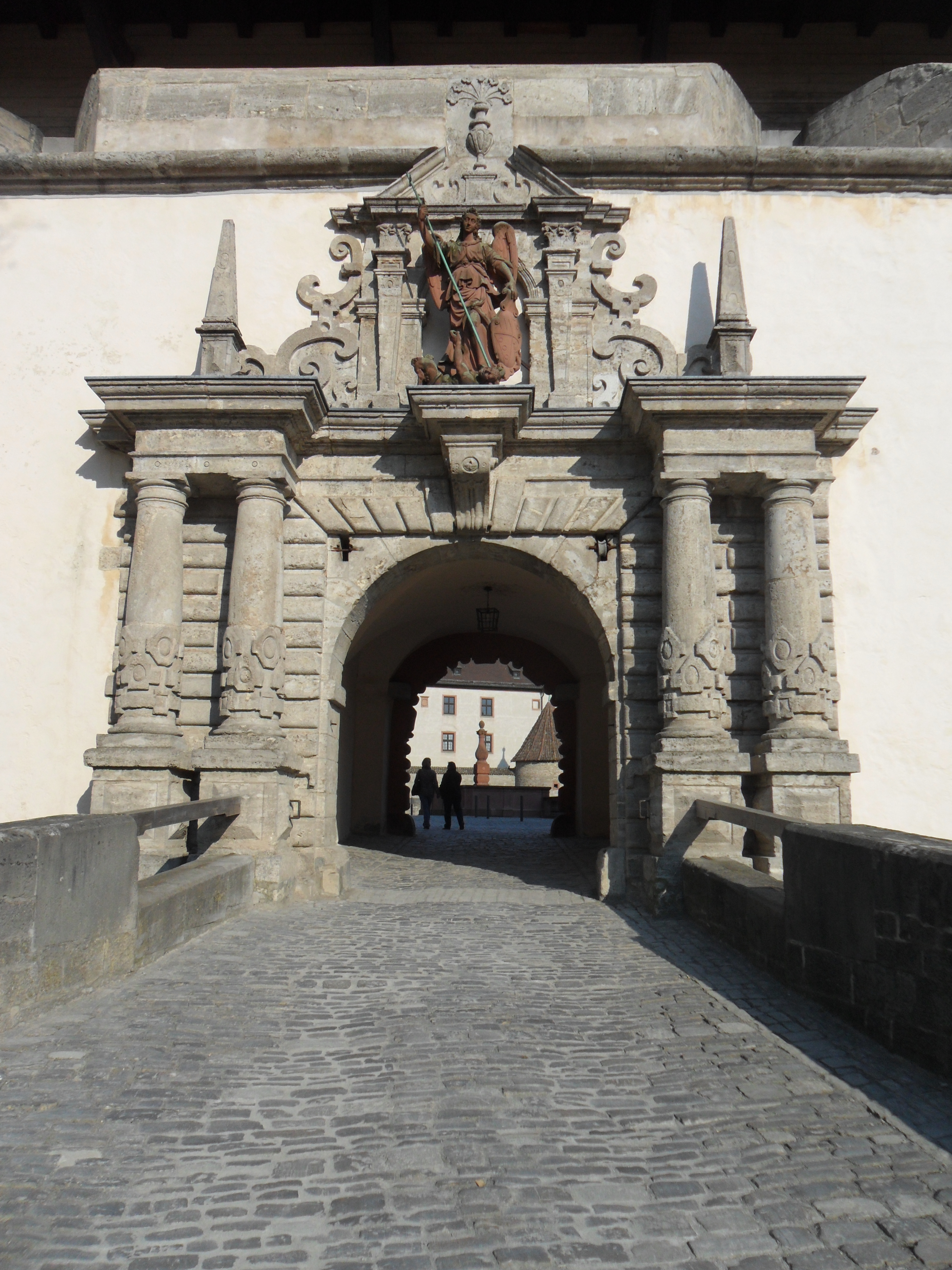
Echtertor

The Fürstenbau is surrounded by medieval fortifications (walls and towers), enclosing an outer ward known as Scherenbergzwinger (actually built under Bishop Otto von Wolfskeel). To the east this includes the Fürstengarten, a formal Baroque garden facing the city. Entrance to the inner castle is via the Gothic Scherenbergtor.

Beyond a moat, crossed by a stone bridge which in 1716 replaced the previous drawbridge, lie the outer ring of fortifications and the Echtersche Vorburg. This three-wing part of the fortress includes a large horse trough in the middle of a courtyard, stables and the Echterbastei with Echtertor. Most of these were built during Bishop Echter's reign and under his successors in the 17th century.

=== Outer court and outer bastions ===
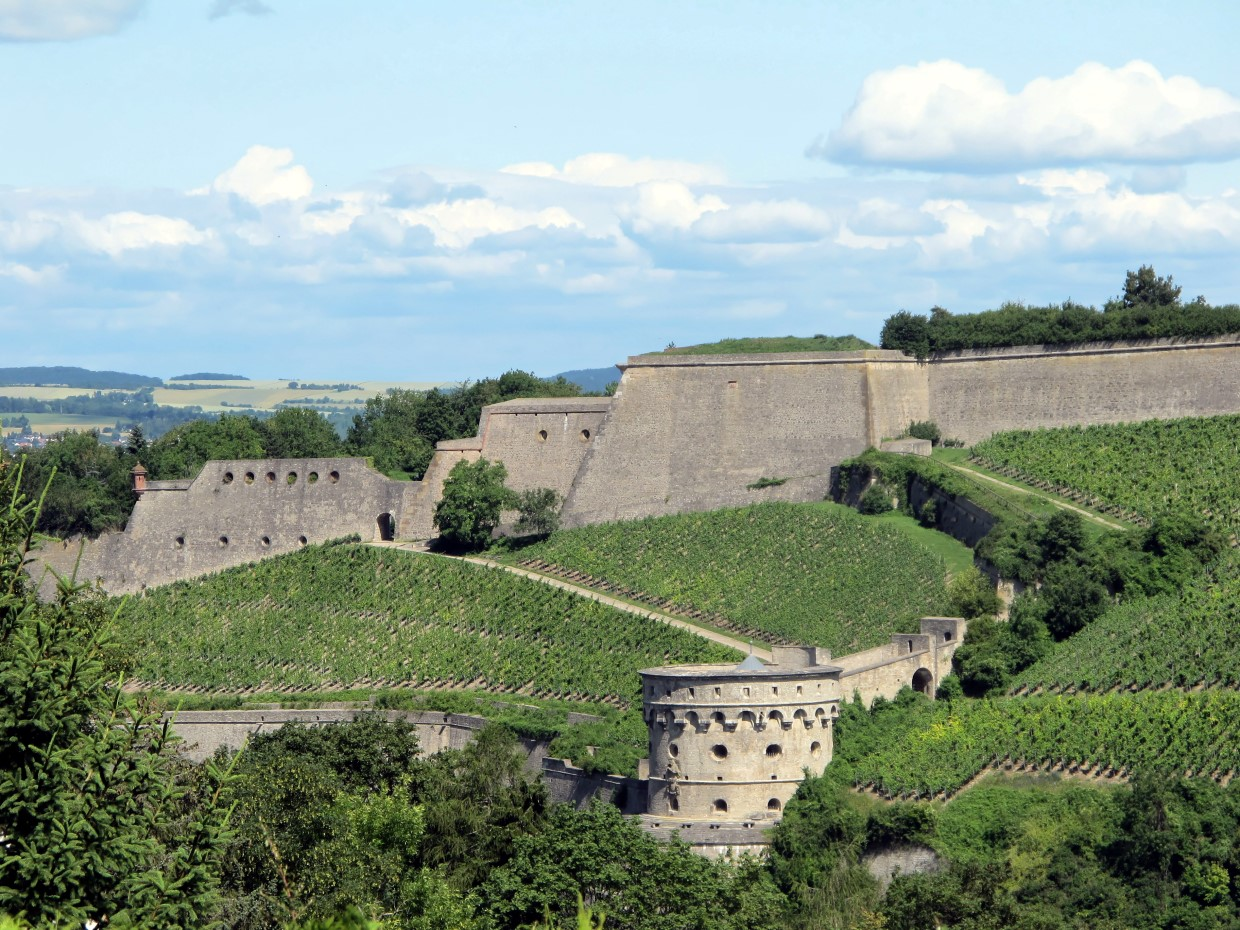
Maschikuliturm, surrounded by vineyards, and western bastions

The outer court is made up of the Neues Zeughaus and the Kommandantenhaus (both early 18th century). Access to this part of the fortress is by the Schönborntor.

The outer bastions surrounding the castle – Bastei Cesar, Bastei St. Johann Nepomuk, Bastei St. Johann Baptist and Bastei St. Nikolaus – were built under Johann Philipp von Schönborn from 1649 to 1658.

Further out, more bastions once existed, but some were built over or are now covered by parks. However, extensive outworks from the early 18th century remain around the core fortress, notably to the west. These are pierced by the inner and outer Höchberger Tor.

To the south is the squat Maschikuliturm, designed by Balthasar Neumann, architect of the Residenz, the last tower to be added to the fortress in the 1720s. The south-easternmost point is the bastion Höllenschlund.

== Today ==
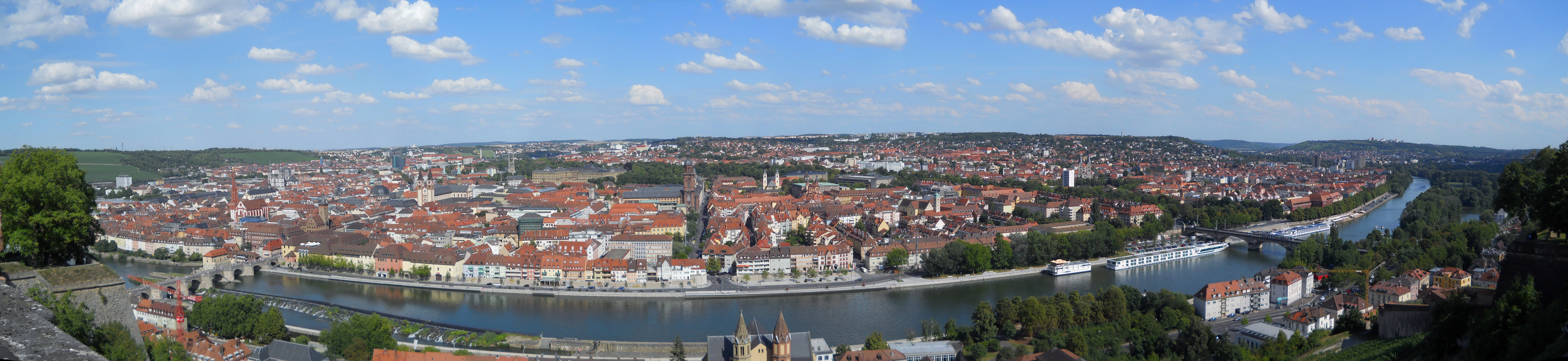
View of Würzburg from the Marienberg Fortress gardens

Today, Festung Marienberg is mostly accessible to the public. This includes the Scherenbergtor (gate), the Burgfried (keep), Saint Mary's Church and the well house.

Since 1946, the Baroque Zeughaus (armory), originally built 1702-1712 but reconstructed after being destroyed in 1866 and 1945, houses the Museum für Franken, formerly the Mainfränkisches Museum, a collection of Franconian works of art from the Middle Ages to the Baroque period, including world-famous Gothic sculptures by Tilman Riemenschneider. There is also a collection of earlier artefacts from Franconia, stretching back to the Paleolithic period. Founded in 1913 as Fränkisches Luitpoldmuseum in the town, the museum's previous location was destroyed by British bombers in March 1945. In 1950–1954, the Echterbastei (also damaged in the bombing) was rebuilt and the museum expanded into this part of the fortress.

The Fürstenbaumuseum in the Fürstenbau (palas) of the fortress, established in the 1930s (originally as two museums), relates 1,200 years of the history of Würzburg and the fortress. It features the Bibra Stairs and apartments, and the Julius Echter apartments. These do not contain the original furnishments, which were either lost in the Swedish sacking of the castle or transported to the new Residenz in 1720, but period pieces. There are also exhibits of ecclesial treasures.

There are two restaurants in the fortress.

== Gallery ==
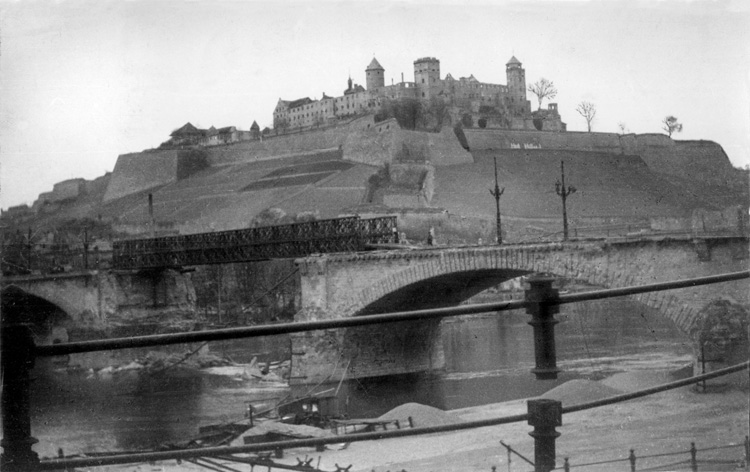
Bailey bridge built over bombed out Ludwig Bridge at base of Marienberg Fortress by the 119th Armored Engineer Battalion of the U.S. 12th Armored Division, April 1945

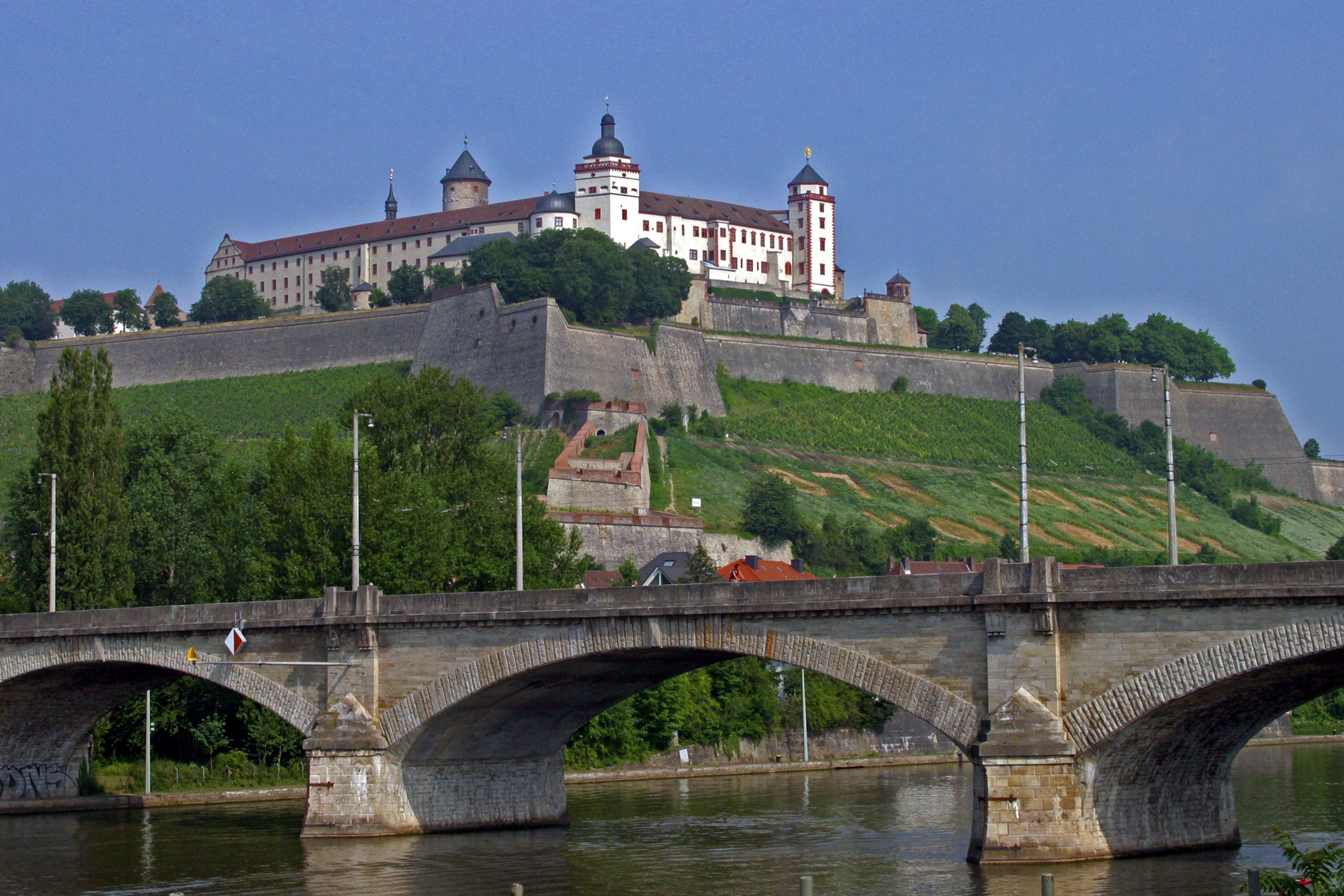
Fortress Marienberg,14 June 2003

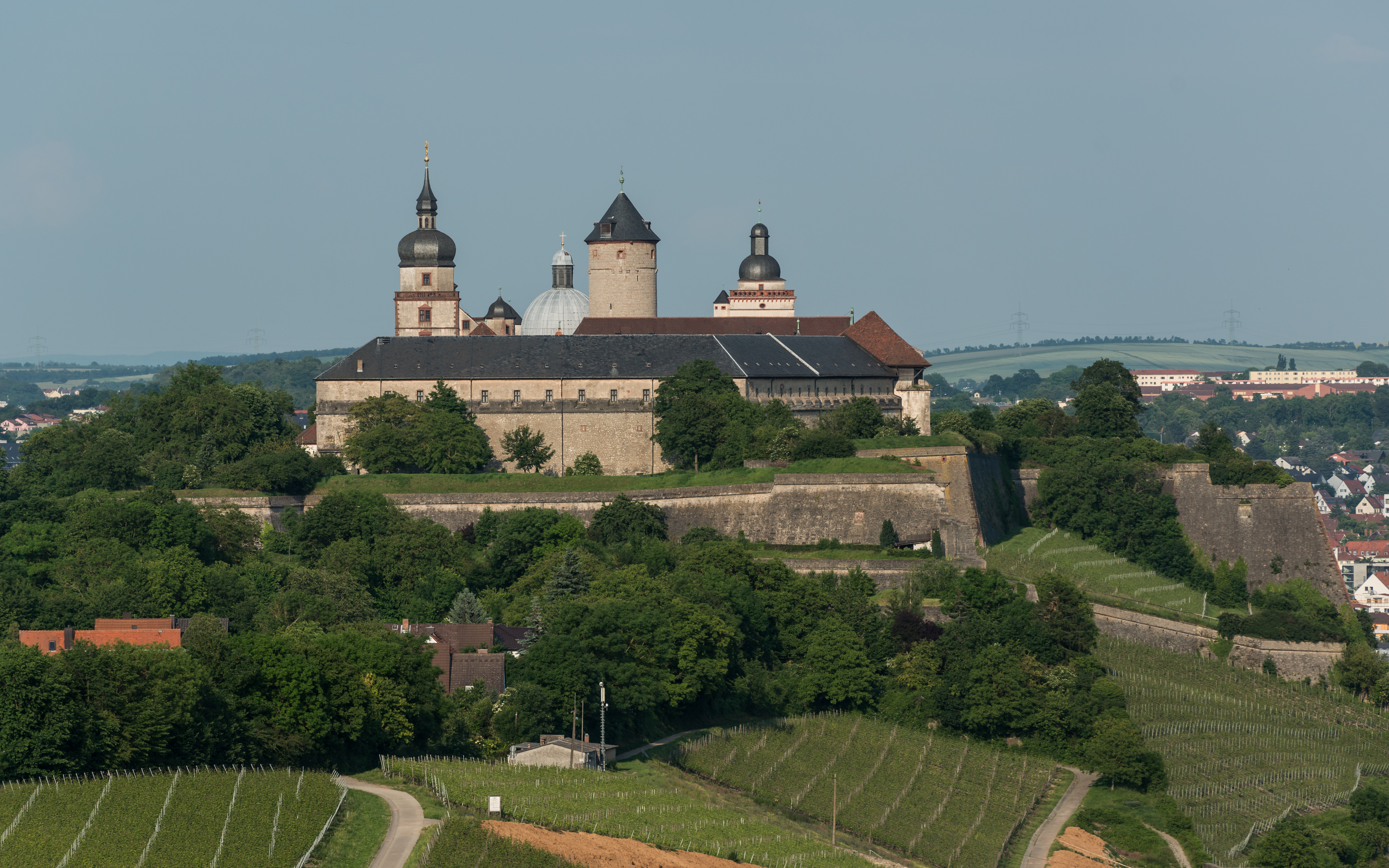
View from west

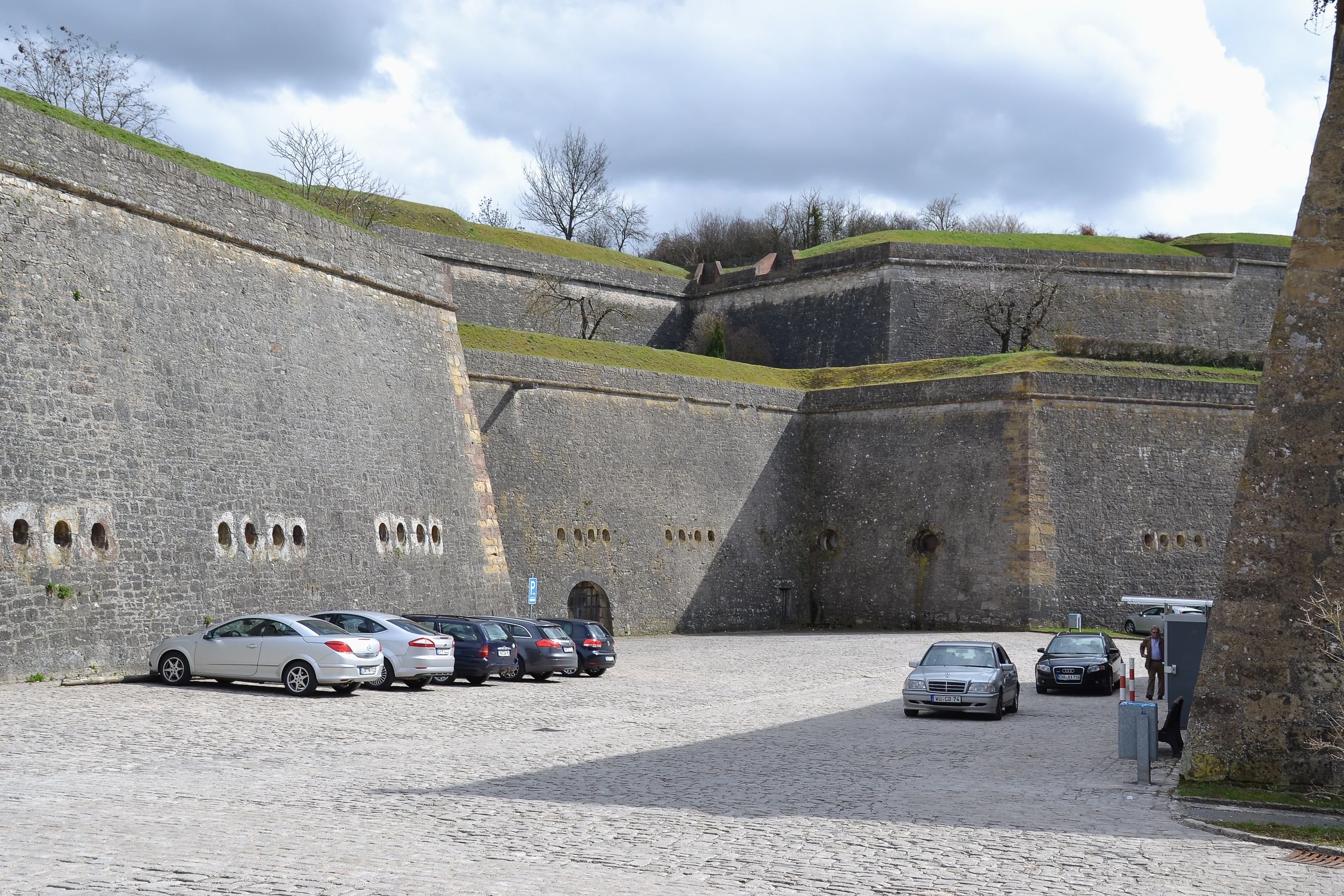
Parking between bastions at the Fortress

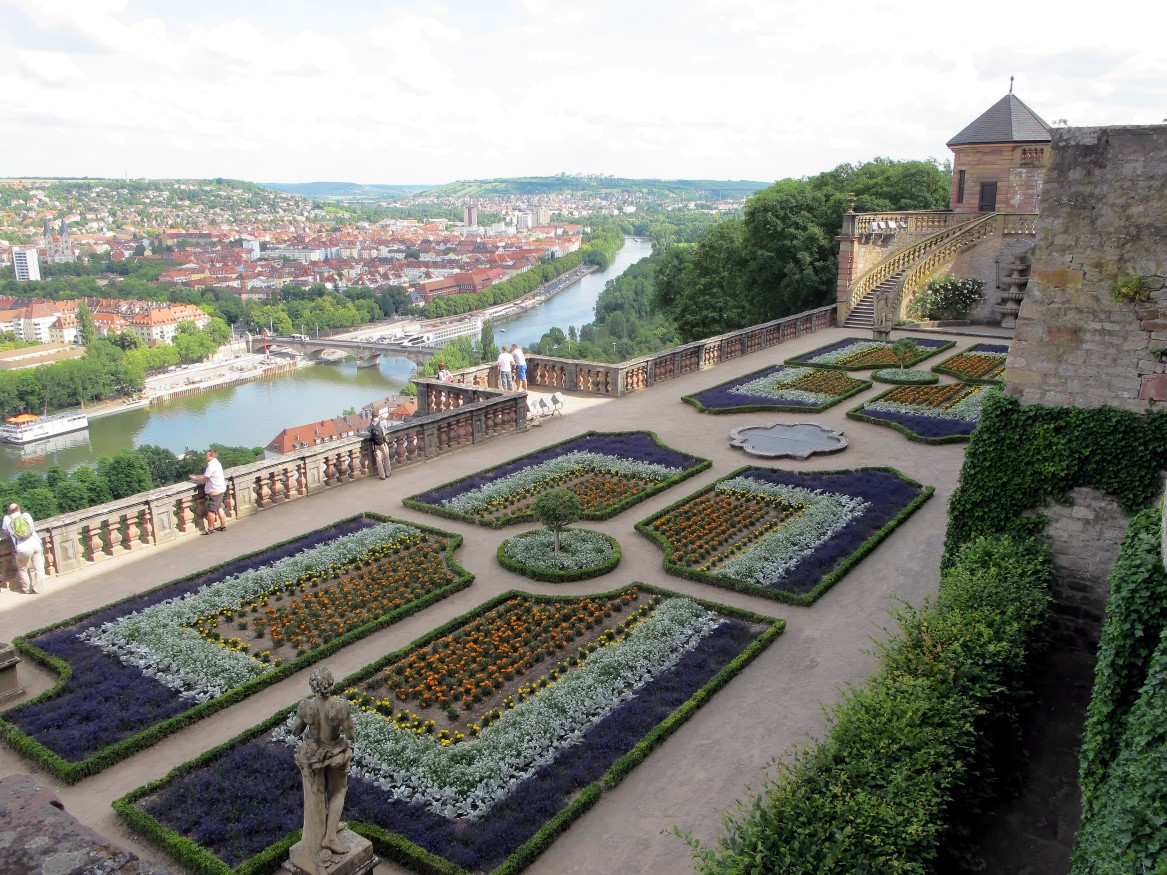
The Fürstengarten (Prince's Garden) overlooking the city

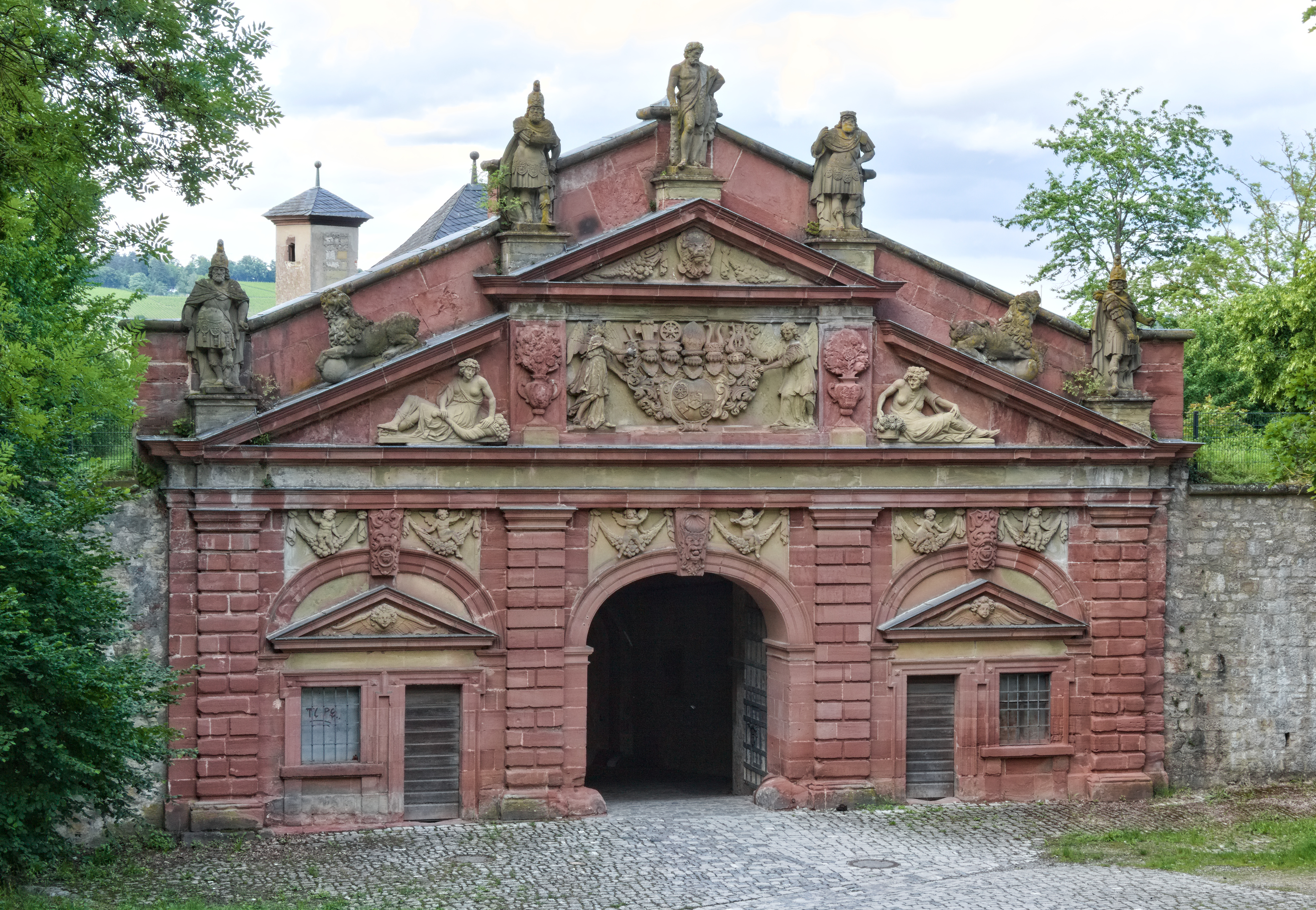
Interior facade of the Neutor (New Gate)

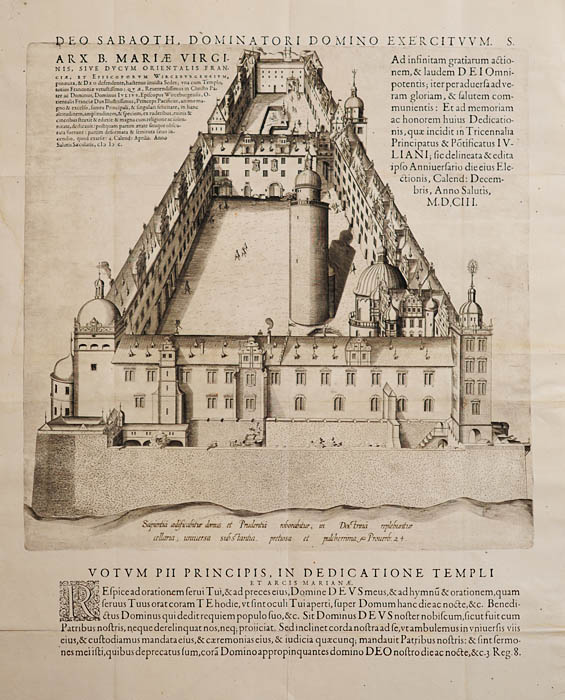
1603 engraving of the Fortress by Johann Leypoldt
