= St. Burchard's Abbey, Würzburg =

Former monastery in Würzburg, Germany

St. Burchard's Abbey
- Kloster St. Burkard, Würzburg
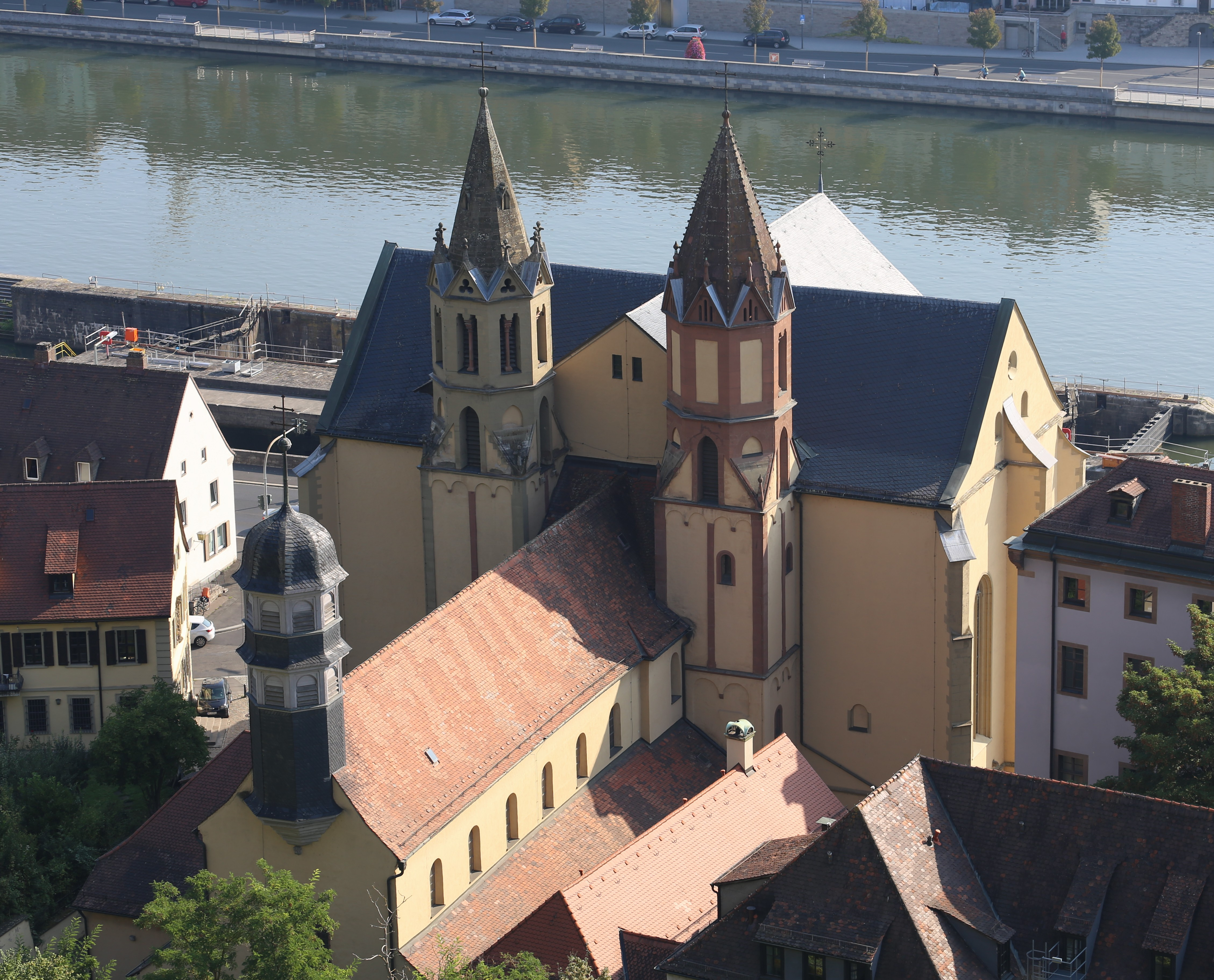
- View of the church from Marienberg Fortress

- Location within Bavaria Location within Germany
- Interactive map of St. Burchard's Abbey

Monastery information
- Order: Benedictines
- Established: ca. 750
- Disestablished: 1803
- Dedication: Mary, Andrew, Magnus, Burchard
- Diocese: Diocese of Würzburg
- Controlled churches: St. Burchard

People
- Founder: Bishop Burchard of Würzburg

Architecture
- Style: Romanesque/Gothic

Site
- Location: Würzburg, Germany
- Coordinates: 49°47′23.5″N 9°55′29.6″E
- Public access: yes
- Website: http://www.st-burkard.de/

St. Burchard's Abbey was a Benedictine monastery in Würzburg, Germany, initially known as St. Andrew's Abbey. It was the first abbey established in Würzburg, founded ca. 750. In 1464, it was transformed into a Stift.

Since the dissolution of the Stift in 1803, the abbey church has been used as the parish church St. Burkard.

== History ==
St. Andrew's was founded by Bishop Burchard of Würzburg (742-53) on the left bank of the Main at the foot of the Marienberg shortly after 748. It was the first abbey in Würzburg and initially dedicated to Andrew the Apostle, Mary and Magnus. It was known as St. Andrew's Abbey.

Until ca. 788 it was also the seat of the clerics attached to the cathedral (then located on the peak of the Marienberg). In the 10th century, the monastery was deserted, having been transformed into a collegiate church at some point earlier. In 986, Hugo von Rothenburg, Bishop of Würzburg, refounded the abbey and once again called Benedictines to the place. He also moved the remains of Burchard to be reburied in the abbey's church, which was renamed St. Burchard.

The old abbey building burned down around the year 1000. Only after around 1033, Abbot Willemund had the abbey church rebuilt in Romanesque style. It was dedicated in 1042 in the presence of Emperor Heinrich III by Bishop Bruno of Würzburg.

During the High Middle Ages the abbey was influenced by ideas from Gorze Abbey (ca. 1057) and Hirsau Abbey (12th century). Construction included the narthex (1168) under Abbot Engelhard and the polygonal topping-up of the two eastern towers (1249) under Abbot Konrad.

Since its establishment, the abbey had been a proprietary monastery of the Bishop of Würzburg. It thus did not have a Vogt. The convent was completely made up of nobles. In late Medieval times life in the abbey significantly deviated from the Benedictine rule.

Yielding to the request of the monks, Pope Pius II, in a papal bull dated 4 February 1464, changed the abbey church into a collegiate church (Ritterstift), and permitted the former monks to remain as canons. The abbot, Johann von Allendorf, became Probst. Through this change the abbey became the second noble Stift in Würzburg (next to the Domstift of the cathedral). The provost was henceforth always a member of the cathedral chapter.

In 1495, a late-Gothic high altar was added. Around that time construction of the polygonal east choir and the transept started. However, few works of art survived the destruction caused by the Peasants' War of 1525. One of them was a Madonna by Tilman Riemenschneider (ca. 1490).

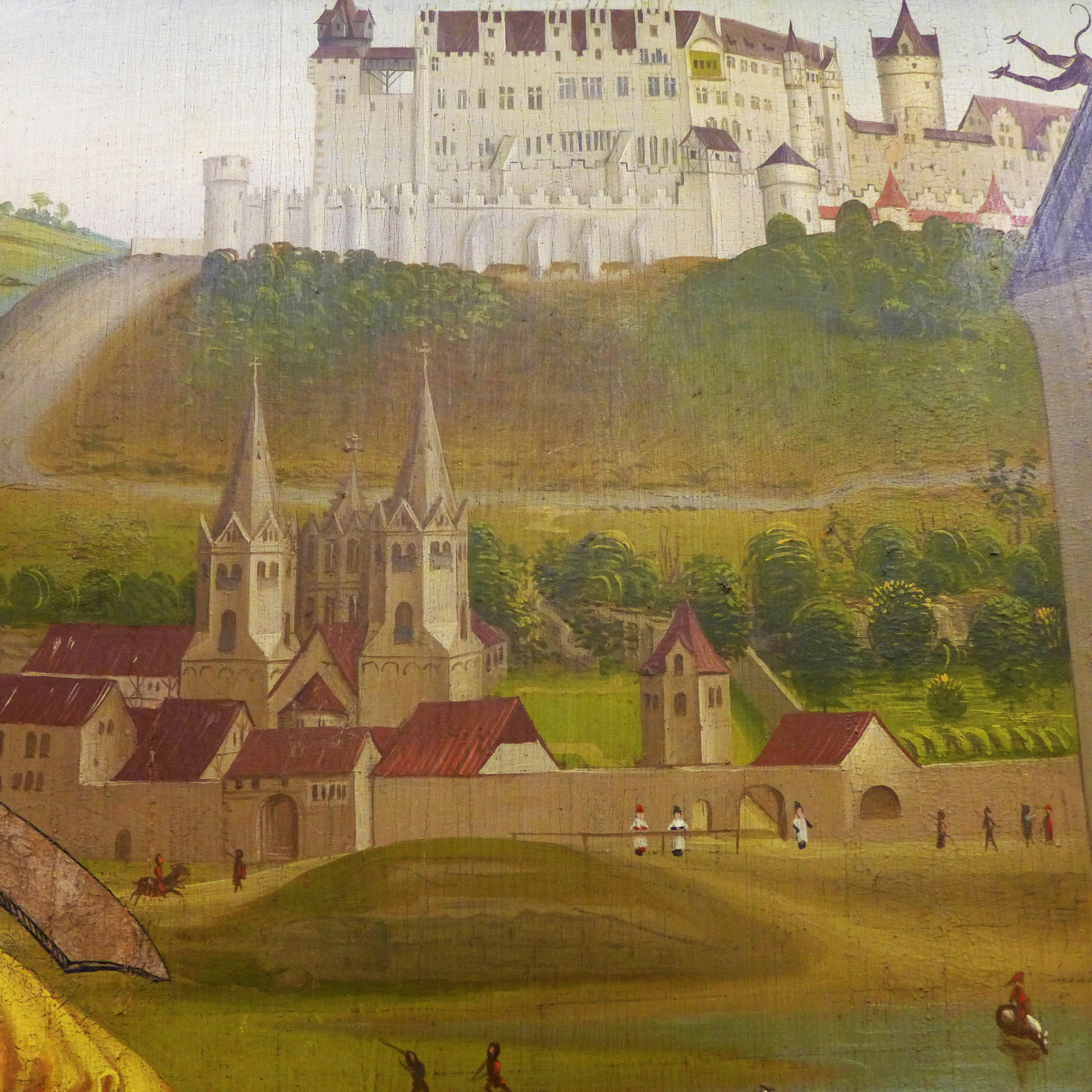
The abbey ca. 1490

Due to the possession of significant forest properties the abbey had sufficient income throughout its history. Nevertheless, debts were a problem from time to time. In the 16th century, "loose morals" among the then 18 canons became an issue. As a consequence, Bishop Julius Echter von Mespelbrunn temporarily put St. Buchard under forced administration.

During the Thirty Years' War the abbey wasa sacked by Swedish troops and the church was severely damaged. Only from 1667 did the Stift again have its own consecrated church. During the Counter-Reformation and Baroque periods the canons focused on the pastoral care of its 17 parishes.

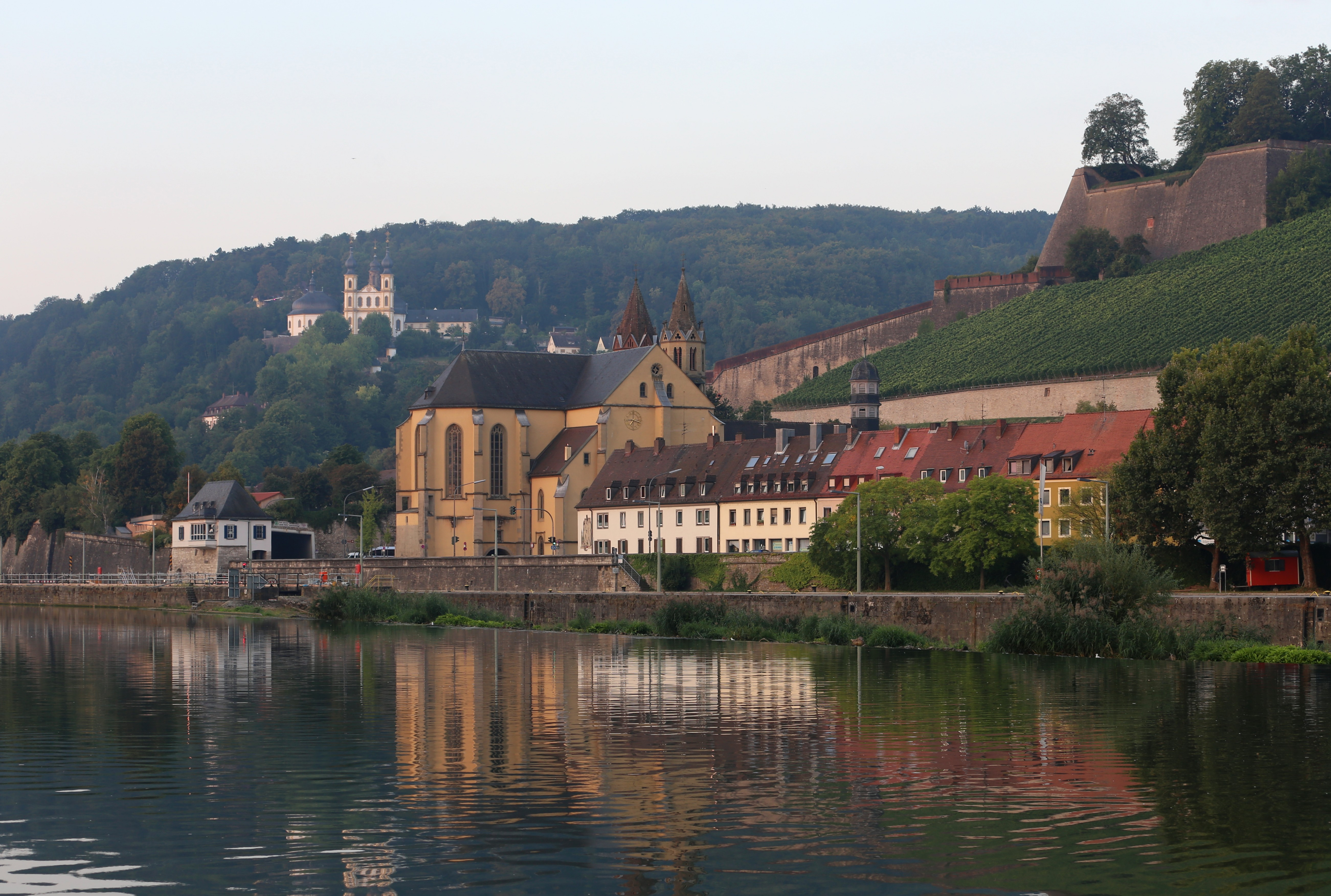
The church at the foot of Marienberg, with the Käppele in the back

In 1663-7, Bishop Johann Philipp von Schönborn had the original west choir, western transept and western tower demolished to make room for a new fortification of the slopes beneath Marienberg Fortress and a shipping canal. At that time the interior of the east choir and east transept was finished, the work having been repeatedly interrupted by war.

In 1803, the abbey was dissolved in favour of the Electorate of Bavaria. At the time, it consisted of the provost, the dean, eight canons, nine Domizellare (aspirants to the position of canon) and twelve vicars who were responsible for the parish work. The abbey church (Stiftskirche) became a parish church.

On 16 March 1945, during the Allied Bombing of Würzburg in World War II the church was mostly spared. The truss was burned as was the nave, but choir and transept survived. The church was re-opened in 1950.

== Description ==
=== Church ===
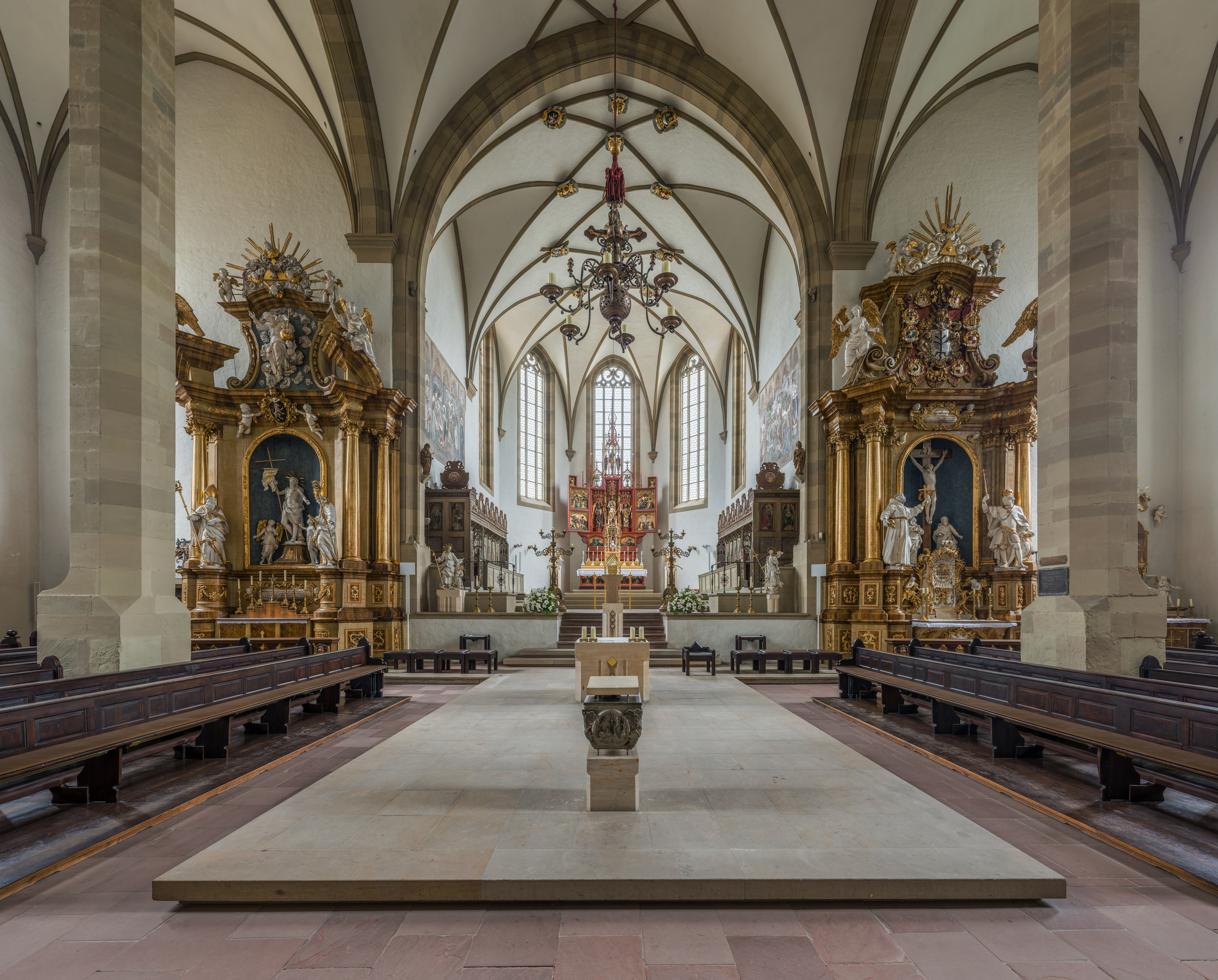
Crossing and altar

The architectural features include Romanesque and Gothic ones. The Romanesque three-aisled nave, the two towers and the north portal from the times of the Salian dynasty are partially still extant.

One feature that illustrates the transition to early-Gothic is a capital with reliefs now used as an offering box.

The Katharinenglocke (bell) from the mid-13th century is the oldest extant bell in the diocese.
