= Hedan II =

Ruler of Thuringia

Heden, Hedan, or Hetan II (died 741), called the Younger, was a Duke of Thuringia, one of the "older" stem duchies (Stammesherzogtums), from around 700 until his death. He may have been the Hedan who married Saint Bilihild.

One of the chief sources for his life is the Passio minor sancti Kiliani. According to the Passio, after the revenge of God came upon his father Gozbert, who had married his brother's widow Geilana, who was reproved for it by Kilian, who in turn paid the price for his temerity, Hedan was chased from the realm, and his mother Geilana ruled as duchess (689). Sometime later Hedan returned as an adult and took over (before 704). The duchy over which Hedan and his ancestors ruled was the region around the river Main. Only under Hedan did the duke take up an extensive interest in the lands to the east, the region today called Thuringia. Hedan's claim to rule Thuringia may have been claimed through his wife Theodrada.

Hedan's hypothetical relationship with Bilihild is established by the 12th-century Vita Bilihildis, based on earlier sources, which names Bilihild's husband as dux militum gentilis ... vocabulo Hetan. Theotbald on the other hand may have been a brother of Theodrada and the man who preceded Hedan in ruling Thuringia.

It was during the reign of Hedan that the conversion of the Thuringii to Christianity, abortively initiated by Kilian, began to bear fruit under Boniface. In 742 the diocese of Erfurt was established. The support of the duke himself and his wife Theodrada was instrumental in establishing the new religion in Thuringia. In a donation dated 1 May 704 in Würzburg, his capital, Hedan, with the consent of his wife and his son Thuring and the Frankish magnates Rocco and Doda, granted the bishop Willibrord the places of Arnstadt (Arnestati), Mühlberg (Mulenberge), and Großmonra (Monhore). A document dated 18 April 716/717, Hedan enlarged his earlier donation by granting hereditary estates on the Saale and at Hammelburg (on the Saale) to the counts Cato and Sigeric as well as the nutricius (tutor or regent) Ado and the magnates Adogoto and Hereric.

Through his wife Hedan had connexions to the Rodoin family and the family of Gundoin, Duke of Alsace. He also had ties to the monastery of Weißenburg in Alsace. His daughter Immina entered the house monastery of Marienberg.
