= St. Kilian's Abbey, Würzburg =

Former monastery in Würzburg, Germany

Coordinates: 49°47′24″N 9°55′29″E

The Abbey of the Holy Redeemer (S. Salvatoris), also called St. Kilian's Abbey, was a Benedictine monastery in Würzburg, Germany. It was founded by Burchard, the first Bishop of Würzburg, about 745.

The monks had charge of Würzburg Cathedral (Salvatormünster) and the cathedral school. The latter gained considerable renown. Probably owing to laxity in observance of the rule, Bernwelf, Bishop of Würzburg, replaced the monks in 786 by canons who led a common life and were popularly styled Brothers of St. Kilian. The expelled monks, more than fifty in number, found a home at the Abbey of Neustadt on the Main, where Bishop Megingaud, who had resigned the See of Würzburg, was abbot.
