= Saint Colman (martyr) =

Irish Christian missionary

Saint Colman or Kolonat
- St. Colman by Harry Clarke

Apostle to the Franconians
- Born: 7th century Ireland
- Died: 689; Würzburg, Kingdom of the Franks
- Venerated in: Eastern Orthodox Church; Roman Catholic Church; True Orthodox Church
- Feast: July 8

Saint Colman or Kolonat (Irish: Colmán; Latin: Colomannus; c. 600 – July 8, 689 AD in Würzburg) was an Irish-born Christian priest and missionary.

== Life ==
He was a companion of Kilian and Totnan as missionaries to Franconia and Thüringen.

In 686, the three of them travelled to Rome with nine other Christians and met Pope Conon. They then travelled on to Wurzburg. At this point the three stayed in Wurzburg while the others travelled throughout the area. Duke Gozbert of Wurzburg became a Christian, but his wife remained a pagan.

Kilian told Duke Gozbert that he was breaking Christian scripture by marrying his brother's widow, Geilana. Geilana was so angry that she sent her soldiers to the main square of Würzburg, where the three missionaries were preaching, and had them beheaded.

== Legacy ==
After their deaths, their relics were revered as cures for illnesses.

In 752 Burchard of Wessex became the first bishop of Würzburg. He transferred the relics of the three men into the new cathedral which was dedicated to St Kilian.

Saint Colman's feast day is July 8.
