= Saint Totnan =

German-Irish saint (7th century)

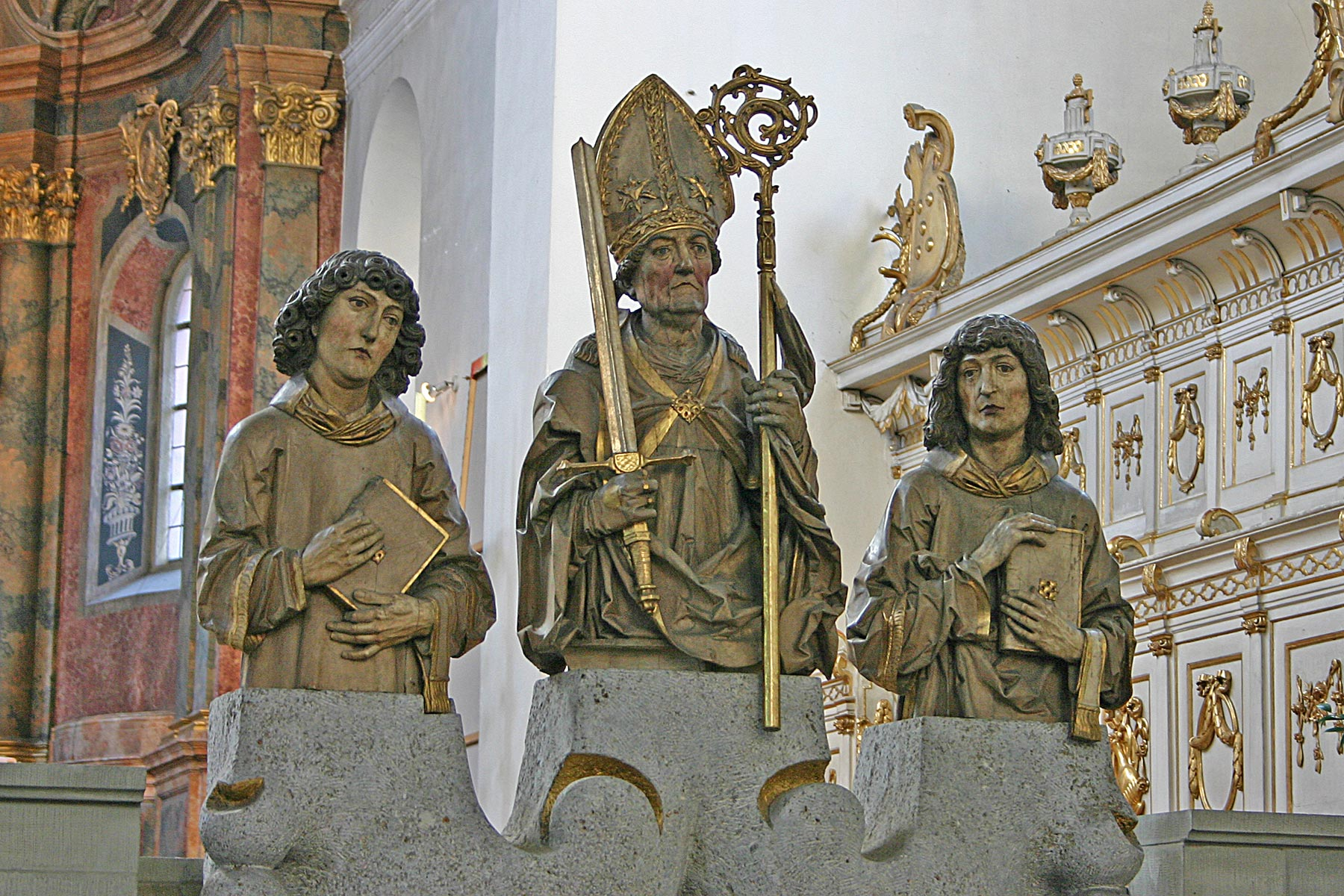
- Kilian, Colman and Totnan, sculpture by Riemenschneider in Neumünster-Kirche, Würzburg

Apostle to the Franconians
- Born: 7th century Ireland
- Died: 689; Würzburg
- Venerated in: Roman Catholicism, Eastern Orthodoxy, True Orthodoxy
- Patronage: Bishopric of Würzburg

Saint Totnan (7th century – July 8, 689 AD) was an Irish Franconian apostle. He was born in Ireland and was martyred along with Saint Colman and Saint Kilian in Würzburg in 689.

In 686, he travelled to Rome with Kilian, Colman and nine other Christians. They met Pope Conon and travelled on to Wurzburg. At this point the three stayed in Wurzburg while the others travelled throughout the area. Duke Gozbert of Wurzburg became a Christian, but his wife remained a pagan.

Kilian told Gozbert that he was breaking Christian scripture by marrying his brother's widow, Geilana. Geilana retaliated by sending her soldiers to the main square of Würzburg, where the three were preaching, and having them beheaded.

== Legacy ==
After their deaths, their relics were revered as cures for illnesses.

In 752 Burchard of Wessex became the first bishop of Würzburg. He transferred the relics of the three men into the new cathedral which was dedicated to St Kilian.

Totnan was posthumously named patron saint of the Bishopric of Würzburg. His statue was located in Alte Mainbruecke.

His feast day is 8 July.
