= Großmonra =

- Ortsteil of Kölleda
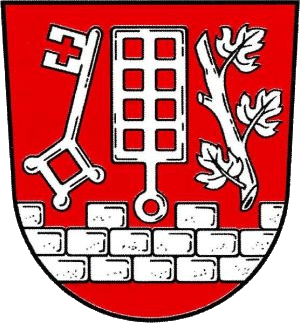
- Coat of arms
- Interactive map of Großmonra
- Location within Germany Location within Thuringia
- Coordinates: 51°13′N 11°18′E
- Country: Germany
- State: Thuringia
- District: Sömmerda
- Town: Kölleda

Area
  - Total: 38.92 km^{2} (15.03 sq mi)
- Elevation: 185 m (607 ft)

Population (2011-12-31)
  - Total: 930
  - Density: 24/km^{2} (62/sq mi)
- Time zone: UTC+01:00 (CET)
  - Summer (DST): UTC+02:00 (CEST)
- Postal codes: 99625
- Dialling codes: 03635
- Vehicle registration: SÖM
- Website: www.grossmonra.de

Großmonra (German pronunciation: [ˈɡʁoːsˌmɔnʁa]) is a village and a former municipality in the Sömmerda district of Thuringia, Germany. Since 31 December 2012, it has been part of the town Kölleda.
