= Gailana =

Gailana or Geilana (7th century – fl. 689) was a duchess consort of Thuringia by her respective marriages to brothers Hedan I and Gozbert. She reportedly ruled as duchess regnant after the death of her spouse in 689.

She was first married to Heden I and, upon his death in 687, to his brother and successor Gozbert. She was the mother of Hedan II.

She is known from the hagiography of Saint Kilian. During her second marriage, Kilian came to the duchy as a Christian missionary, converting Gozbert to Christianity. Geilana, however, preferred to remain faithful to Germanic paganism. Kilian then demanded that Gozbert divorce Geilana, since their marriage was not legal in accordance to the Christian view of kinship. When Gozbert left for military campaign warfare, Gayala had Kilian assassinated in Gozbert's absence with the support of the pagan courtiers, who resented Killian's ambition to control their lives.

According to the hagiography, Geilana became mentally ill after the murder. A pagan reaction resulted in the death of Gozbert shortly after and forced Hedan II to flee. Other sources claim that Geilana ruled as duchess regnant (689). Sometime later Hedan returned as an adult and took over (before 704).
