= Saint Kilian =

German-Irish saint

Coordinates: 53°48′48.8″N 6°58′51.9″W

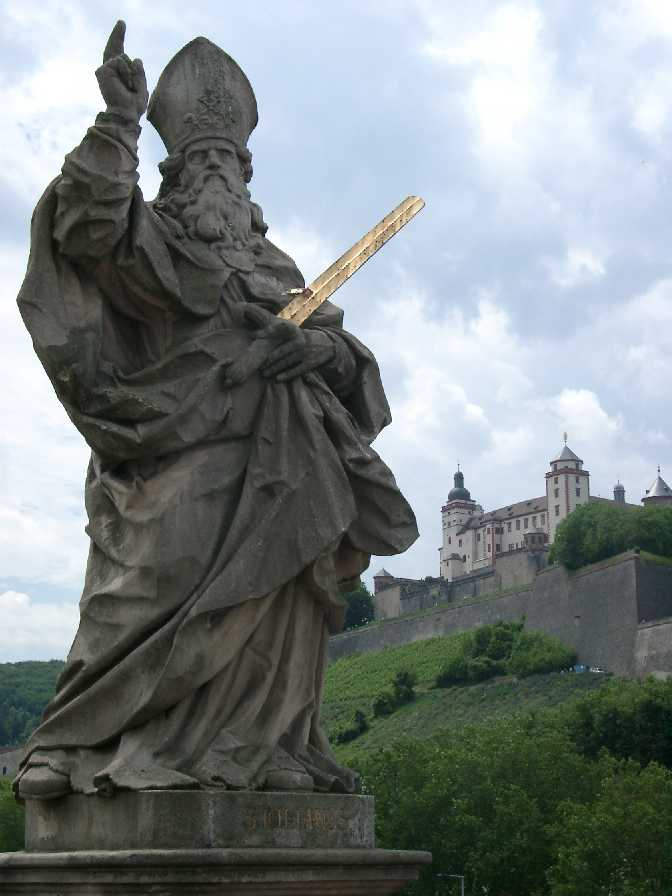
- Statue of Saint Kilian in Würzburg, Germany

Apostle to the Franconians
- Born: 640; Cloughballybeg, Mullagh, Ireland
- Died: 8 July 689; Würzburg, Franconia, Bavaria
- Venerated in: Catholic Church; Eastern Orthodox Church
- Feast: 8 July
- Attributes: wearing a bishop's mitre and wielding a sword
- Patronage: sufferers of rheumatism

Kilian, also spelled Cillian or Killian (or alternatively Irish: Cillín; Latin: Kilianus, original Gaelic form Ceallach), was an Irish missionary bishop and the Apostle of Franconia (now the northern part of Bavaria), where he began his labours in the latter half of the 7th century. His feast day is 8 July.

== Background ==
Several biographies of him are extant. The oldest texts which refer to him are an 8th-century necrology at Würzburg and the notice by Hrabanus Maurus in his martyrology. The name has several variations in spelling (e.g. Chillian, Killian, Cilian, Kilian). In Ireland, the preferred spelling is Cillian; the name appears thus in the Irish liturgical calendar.

== Accounts of his life ==
According to Irish sources, Kilian was born to noble parents in approximately the year 640 in Cloughballybeg, near Mullagh in the south-east of what is now County Cavan in Ireland. Some records state that Kilian served as a monk in the celebrated monastery at Hy, being an early name for what was later known as Iona. He began his education in Rosscarbery (the School of Ross), County Cork, and completed it in Tuosist in County Kerry.

In the summer of 686 Kilian, with eleven companions, travelled through Gaul to Rome to receive missionary faculties from the Pope, arriving in late autumn and meeting with Pope Conon. From there they traveled to the castle of Würzburg, which was inhabited by the East Frankish ruler, Herzog (Duke) Gozbert, who was, like his people, still pagan.

The original group separated – some departing to seek other fields of missionary work, while Kilian with two companions, the priest Colmán (also called Colonan or Kolonat) and the deacon Totnan, remained in Würzburg. Kilian made this town the base of his activity, which extended over an ever-increasing area in East Franconia and Thüringen (Thuringia). He converted Duke Gozbert with a large part of his subjects to Christianity.

== Death ==
Kilian told the Herzog (Duke) that he was in violation of sacred scripture by being married to his brother's widow, Geilana. When Geilana, whom Kilian had failed to convert to Christianity, heard of Kilian's words against her marriage, she was so angry that, in the absence of the Duke, she had her soldiers sent to the main square of Würzburg, where Kilian and his colleagues were preaching, and had him beheaded, along with two of his companions, Colmán and Totnan.

== Veneration ==
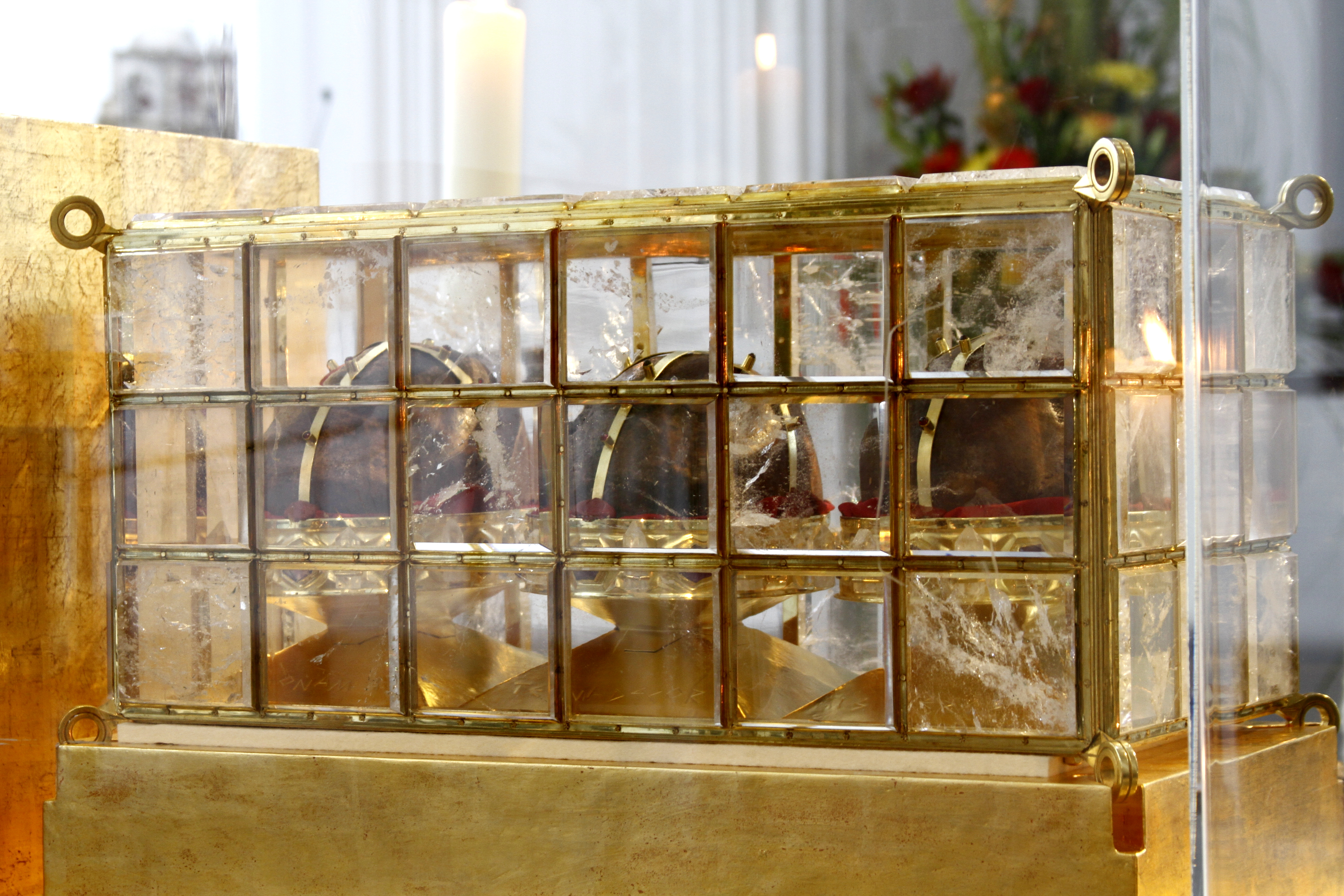
Relic of Kilian, Colman and Totnan

Burchard, appointed by Boniface as the first bishop of Würzburg, built a cathedral on the spot where the martyrs were said to have met their deaths and had their relics unearthed and buried within a vault of that cathedral church.

Their skulls, inlaid with precious stones, have been preserved to this day. On St. Kilian's Day, a glass case containing the three skulls is removed from a crypt, paraded through the streets before large crowds, and put on display in Würzburg Cathedral (dedicated to Kilian). Statues of these three saints (among others) line the famous Saints' Bridge across the river Main.

=== Patronage ===
Kilian is one of the patron saints for sufferers of rheumatism.

Kilian is the patron saint of the parish of Tuosist, near Kenmare in County Kerry, where he is believed to have resided before travelling to Germany. A church and holy well are named after him and his feast day, July 8, is traditionally celebrated with a pattern when crowds visit the well for prayers, followed by evening social events.

He is also the patron saint of Paderborn, Germany.

=== Iconography ===
Kilian is usually portrayed wearing a bishop's mitre and holding a sword, which was the instrument of his martyrdom (as in his statue at Würzburg).

== Legacy ==
The Kiliani-Volksfest, which runs for two weeks every July, is the main civil and religious festival in the region around Würzburg, Germany.

Places named for Saint Kilian include:

=== Churches ===
- St. Kilian's Catholic Church, Mullagh, County Cavan, Ireland
- Teampall Cheallaigh, in Mullagh, County Cavan, Ireland ("The oldest known church in the parish of Mullagh was the Catholic Church, Teampall Cheallaigh “the Church of Ceallach,” the original Gaelic form of the name Kilian.")
- St. Killians Church in Lauragh, Tuosist, County Kerry Ireland
- St. Kilian's Catholic Church, Blenker, Wisconsin
- St. Kilian's Church, Heilbronn in Heilbronn, Germany
- St. Kilian Catholic Church in Hassfurt, Germany
- Saint Kilian Catholic Church in Mission Viejo, California
- Saint Kilian Catholic Church in Farmingdale, New York
- Saint Kilian Catholic Church and School in Hartford, Wisconsin
- Saint Kilian's Catholic Church in Blacklion, Greystones, County Wicklow, Ireland
- Immaculate Conception & St Killian Catholic Church in Clondalkin, County Dublin, Ireland
- St. Kilian's Church in Bendigo, Australia ("The largest wooden church in Australia, and perhaps the world")
- Saint Kilian Catholic Church in St. Kilian, Minnesota

=== Monasteries ===
- St. Kilian's Abbey, Würzburg

=== Schools ===
- St. Kilian's National School in Mullagh, Co. Cavan, Ireland
- St Killian's College in Garron Tower, Northern Ireland
- St Kilian's German School in Dublin, Ireland, is named after St. Kilian as a tribute to the early exchange of education between the two countries of Ireland and Germany.
- St. Kilian Catholic Basic School in Awutu Breku, Ghana
- St. Kilian Catholic Junior High School in Obutu, Ghana
- St. Kilian's Primary School in Bendigo, Australia
- St. Killian Catholic School in Cranberry Township, Pennsylvania

=== Towns ===
- St. Kilian, Minnesota

=== Other ===
- St. Kilian's Heritage Centre is located in the village of Mullagh in County Cavan. It was opened in 1995 by the then President of Ireland, Mary Robinson. Built by the local community in association with the Diocese of Würzburg in southern Germany, the Heritage Centre features many relics and replicas of the saint.
- St. Kilian's well in Cloughbally, Mullagh, Co. Cavan
- St. Kilian's Café is a building on the Christendom College campus in Front Royal, Virginia. It is used as a classroom, gathering space, and social area. It is attached to the Saint John Paul the Great Student Center.

== See also ==
- Kilianstein

Killians Walk. An indoor business district that runs between the Hargraves Mall and Queen street, Bendigo.
