= Bombing of Würzburg in World War II =

Würzburg World War II bombings
- Part of Strategic bombing campaigns in Europe
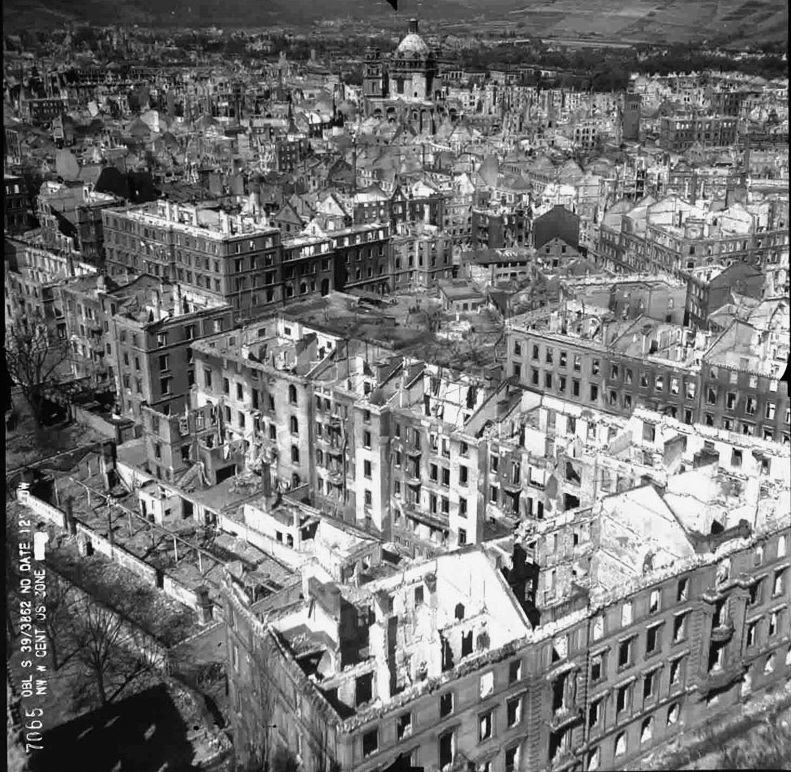
- Central Würzburg in autumn 1945
Location	Bavaria, Germany
Result	82% of the city destroyed, 89% of the city centre 5,000 killed by March 16 raid

Belligerents
(United States) USAAF (United Kingdom) RAF Bomber Command	(Nazi Germany) Luftwaffe

The city of Würzburg (in Franconia, in the north of Bavaria) was attacked as part of the strategic bombing campaign in World War II by the Allies against Nazi Germany. Although lacking major armaments industries (the Würzburg radar was named after the city, but not produced there) and hosting around 40 hospitals at the time, Würzburg was targeted as a traffic hub and as part of the attempt by Bomber Command to break the spirit of the German people. The major raid occurred on March 16, 1945, when Royal Air Force bombers dropped incendiary bombs that set fire to much of the city, killing an estimated 5,000 people and almost completely obliterating the historic town. Almost 90% of the buildings were destroyed by a raid that lasted less than 20 minutes.

All the city's churches, the cathedral, and other monuments were heavily damaged or destroyed. The city center, most of which dated from medieval times, was destroyed in a firestorm.

Over the next 20 years, the buildings of historical importance were painstakingly and accurately reconstructed. The citizens who rebuilt the city immediately after the end of the war were mostly women – Trümmerfrauen ("rubble women") – because the men were either dead or still prisoners of war. On a relative scale, Würzburg was destroyed to a larger extent than was Dresden in a firebombing the previous month.

== Operation on March 16, 1945 ==
The decision to bomb the town was made by RAF Bomber Command in High Wycombe, due to favorable weather conditions predicted for the sixteenth of March. The target had been relatively undamaged and was on the way to other targets including Nuremberg. The half-timber buildings and cramped old city promised the release of a firestorm. The author Detlef Siebert wrote that "Some ... like Würzburg or Pforzheim were primarily selected because they were easy for the bombers to find and destroy. Because they had a medieval centre, they were expected to be particularly vulnerable to fire attack".

Commencing the attack would be the No. 5 group, which had also carried out the heaviest raid on Dresden on February 13–14. Proportional to its size, the small town of Würzburg experienced an even higher proportion of death and destruction than Dresden.

Avro Lancaster bombers of No 5 bomber group took off at 17:00 hours and met at a collection point west of London. The formation took a winding route in order to deceive German air defences, passing over the mouth of the Somme, Reims, and the Vosges mountains in order to reach their target. They crossed the Rhine at south of Rastatt. At around 21:00 225 Lancasters and 11 Mosquitos of the No. 5 group crossed their target from the south.

On the ground, a low-grade air raid alarm sounded at 19:00 hours, and was raised to a high alarm at 20:00. Because of a message from the command centre of the Franconian command in Limburg an der Lahn, the full alarm was given to the Würzburg population at 21:07.

The first bombs dropped at 21:25, with an attack hour over Würzburg set for 21:35 (H). The formation passed over the entire city for the target marker H + 7 minutes (21:42). For this the attack had been preceded at H-9 min. (21:26) with the 627th squadron of Mosquito twin-engined bombers marked with green flares. These illuminated the target area, marking them out by flares on Green parachutes, which the German population called "Christmas Trees." As a marker for the bombers, the sports field on Mergentheimer Strasse was used as a measuring guide. This point was identified at 21:28 with red target marker flares. The bombing was then accomplished with a time lag in sectors ("sector bombing"). The bombers had to fly over the red marker, take a specially assigned altitude and flight path, and trigger their bombs at different times. The target area was marked out like a fan, and the bombers flew in with different release times to ensure a carpet-like coverage. Monitoring the situation was a "master bomber" (at a cruising speed of 350 km/h, each bomber would fly over the entire target area in less than a minute).

The bombing proceeded in three waves from 21:25 to 21:42. First the roofs and windows of the old town were destroyed with 256 heavy bombs and aerial mines (396 tons). This prepared the way for 300,000 incendiary bombs (582 tons). Within a very short time isolated pockets of fire emerged, and this developed into a single area-wide firestorm with temperatures from 1500-2000 °C. The population had only minimal warning, and fortified bunkers were seldom available. For most, the best option was only a provisionally prepared basement shelter. To facilitate locating these shelters, buildings were marked on their walls SR/LSR for shelter, NA for emergency exit, and KSR for no shelter. These markers may still be found today scattered among the buildings. To avoid being caught in the fire-storm or suffocating, many people ran for their lives and tried to reach the banks of the Main river or the edge of town. The fire department was faced with a hopeless battle and tried to contain it with water lanes (Wassergasse). On the approach to Würzburg one Lancaster was shot down by a German night fighter and five more RAF Lancasters were lost during or after the attack. In the ruins of the city in the days which followed 3000 dead were recovered or identified, and an additional 2000 unregistered refugees are believed to have perished under the rubble.

From a distance of 240 km away the departing bomber crews could see the glare of the burning city. Around 02:00 in the morning on March 17, 1945, the last bombers returned to base.

== Results ==
The final report of the No. 5 bomber group on April 10, 1945 gave the destruction of the city at 89%, and for the suburbs at 68%. This was above average, as was the Würzburg district of Heidingsfeld, which some bomber crews targeted before reaching their primary target. The British report accounted for a total of 1207 tons of bombs. The only part of Würzburg unaffected was the Versbach neighbourhood and Veitshöchheim village. Accounting for all neighbourhoods, the average destruction of Würzburg stood at 82%. Specifically this meant 21,062 homes and 35 churches destroyed. Among the destroyed monuments were the Würzburg Cathedral and parts of the Würzburg Residence including its hall of mirrors. The Staircase with the famous fresco by Giovanni Battista Tiepolo survived due to an exceptionally strong ceiling construction for the 18th century. The American occupation forces immediately after the war secured the dilapidated building monuments in an exemplary manner.

== Aftermath ==
On April 6, 1945, the city was surrendered to American forces.

2.7 million cubic metres of rubble was only completely cleared in 1964.

Before the war, the population of Würzburg had been about 108,000, whereas in early 1945 it held 75–85,000 people due to attrition caused by military service. On the day of its capture by American troops (April 6, 1945), 36,850 city residents registered, and the population rose again to 53,000 by the end of 1945. To the left of the main entrance to the main cemetery is a mass grave containing the 3,000 recovered victims of the bombing.

== Overview of all bombing raids on Würzburg ==
Würzburg World War II raids
Date	Result
1944-06-21	8 bombers hit town centre (42 dead)
1945-02-4	2–3 Mosquitos targeted the town centre (30 dead)
1945-02-5	4–6 Mosquitos targeted the town centre (6 dead)
1945-02-12	4 Mosquitos targeted the town centre
1945-02-19	6 aircraft hit town centre (112 dead)
1945-02-23	Mission 843: 37 B-17s destroyed Würzburg main station (171 dead).
1945-03-03	31–42 Mosquitos targeted the town centre (86 dead)
1945-03-16 circa 21.30 hours (CET)	225 Lancaster and 11 Mosquito Pathfinders targeted the town centre and released 1,127 tons of bombs (including around 370,000 incendiaries) in 17 minutes. The raid destroyed the episcopal palace, the historic fortress and the major churches; the baroque city center was irrecoverably damaged, and the Würzburg Residence was badly damaged (ca. 5000 dead).
1945-03-18	fighter destroy military installations
1945-03-22	mission 906: 8 B-24s hit Würzburg as secondary target
1945-03-31	9th USAAF (tactical airforce): A-20s, A-26s and B-26s hit storage depots and small marshalling yards at Würzburg.
