= Burchard of Würzburg =

Anglo-Saxon missionary and bishop

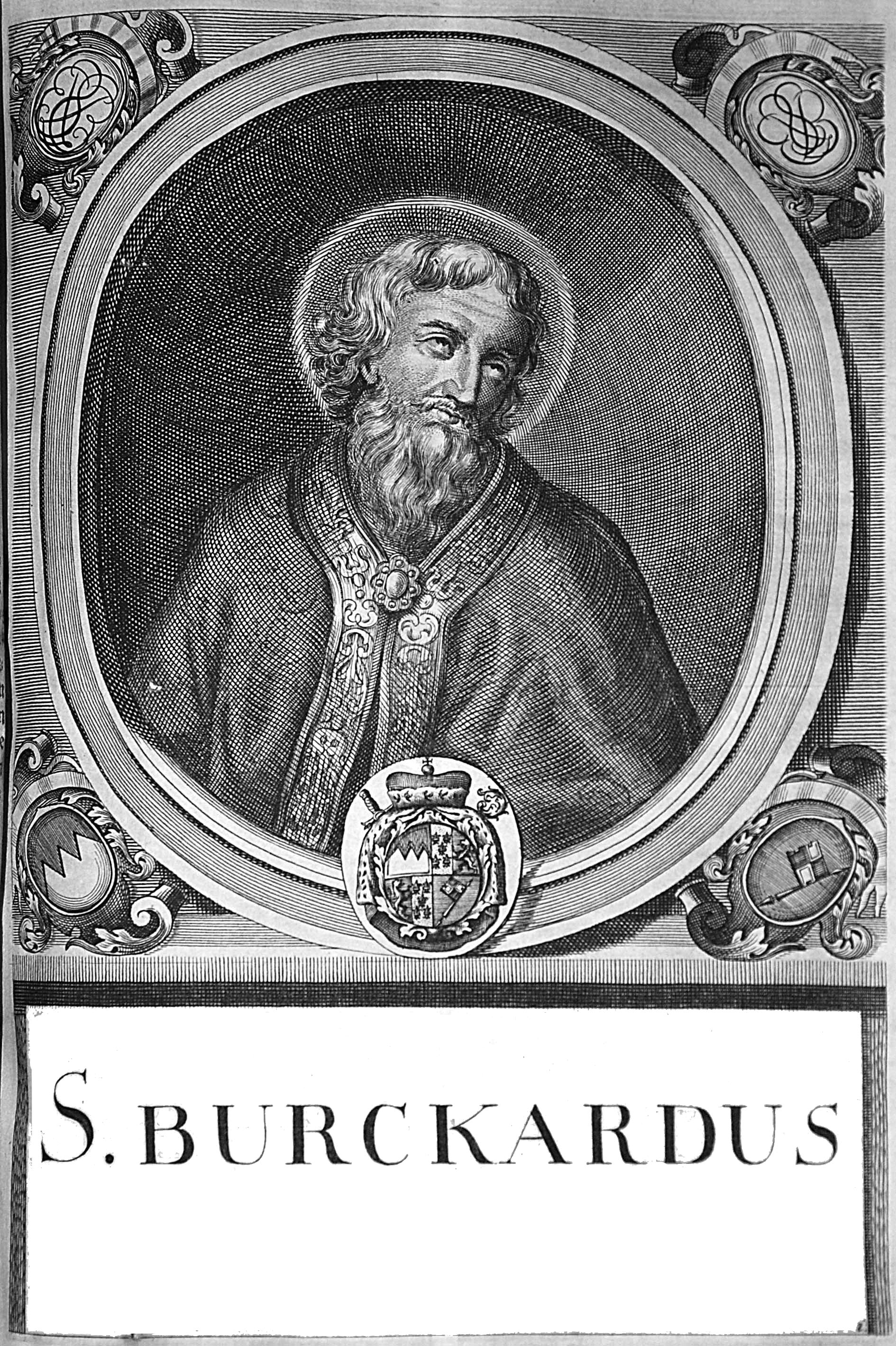
- Engraving by Johann Salver.

Missionary
- Born: unknown England
- Died: c. 752; Würzburg
- Venerated in: Roman Catholic Church; Eastern Orthodox Church
- Feast: 14 October

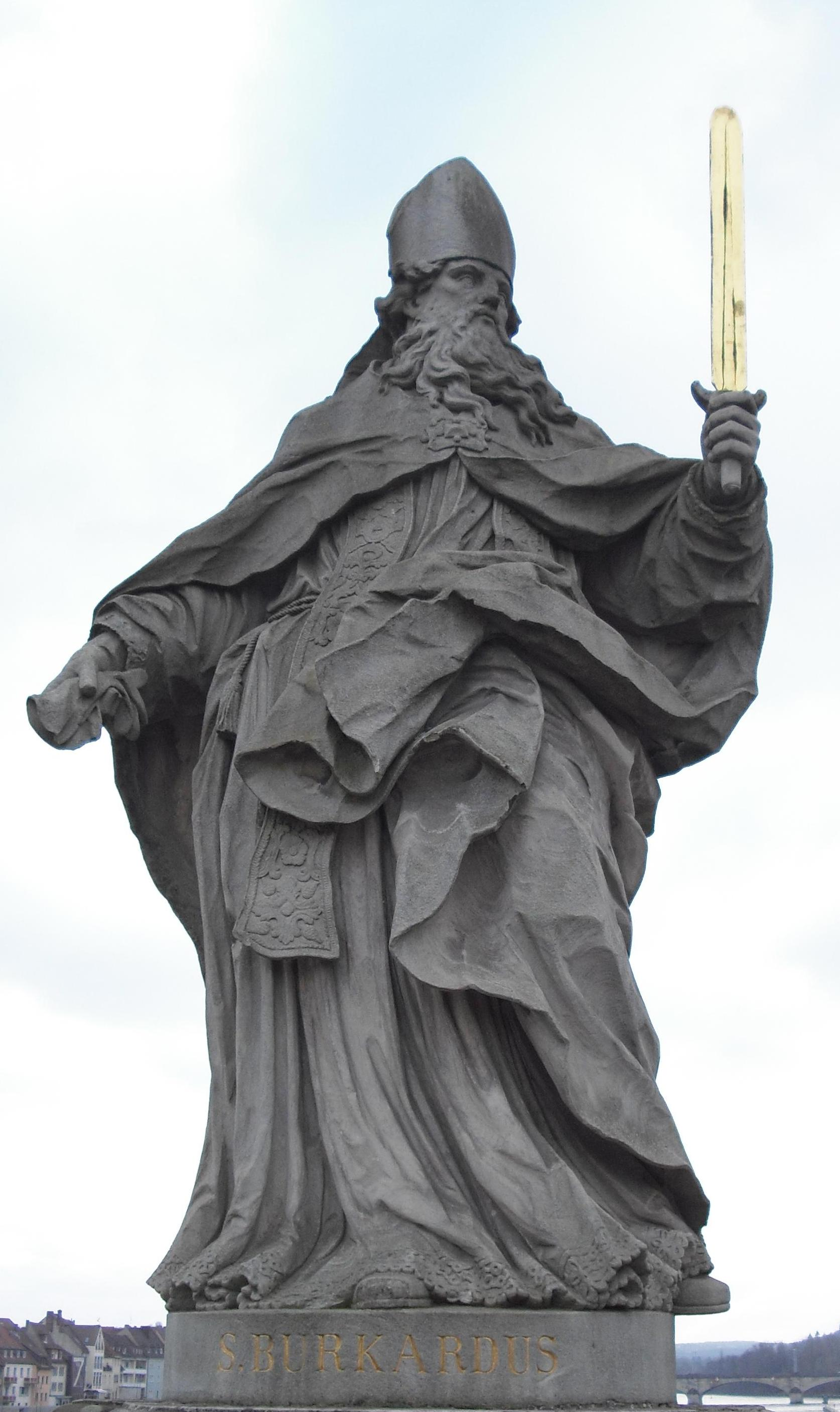
The statue of Saint Burchard on Würzburg's Alte Mainbrücke.

Saint Burchard of Würzburg (in German Burkard or Burkhard) was an Anglo-Saxon missionary who became the first Bishop of Würzburg (741–751).

== Life ==
Burchard was an Anglo-Saxon Benedictine monk possibly of noble birth, and educated at Malmesbury Abbey. He left England after the death of his parents and joined Boniface (who may have been a relative) in his missionary labors, some time after 732. He lived for a time at the Abbey of St. Peter in Fritzlar, founded by Boniface. Later he left to become a missioner in Thuringia.

When Boniface organized bishoprics in Middle Germany, he placed Burchard over that of Würzburg. As was customary at the time, his appointment was approved by Carloman (mayor of the palace), who endowed the diocese with a number of benefits. His consecration can not have occurred later than the summer of 741, since in the autumn of that year, he was documented as officiating as a bishop at the consecration of Willibald of Eichstädt.

Pope Zachary confirmed the new bishopric in 743. Burchard was a member of the first German council in 742, and attended the general Council of the Franks in 747. The following year, as an envoy to Rome from Boniface he presented the results of the council to Pope Zachary. In 750, with Fulrad of Saint-Denis, he brought to Zachary the famous question of Pepin, whose answer was supposed to justify the assumption of regal power by the Carolingians.

In 751, he resigned his see in favor of Megingoz, a Benedictine monk from St. Peter's Abbey in Fritzlar, and retired to a life of solitude. In 752, he dedicated the Abbey of St. Andrew in Würzburg (later renamed St. Burchard's Abbey).

On 8 July 752 he translated the relics of Saint Kilian and his companions Saint Totnan and Saint Colman to Würzburg Cathedral, which was then dedicated to St Kilian.

Burchard died in 753.

== Veneration ==
His relics were translated to the Abbey of St. Andrew in 986.

His feast day is 14 October.

== Sources ==
- Friedrich Wilhelm Bautz: Burchard. In: Biographisch-Bibliographisches Kirchenlexikon (BBKL). Band 1, Bautz, Hamm 1975. 2., unveränderte Auflage Hamm 1990, ISBN 3-88309-013-1, Sp. 816-817.
- Wilhelm Engel: Burchard. In: Neue Deutsche Biographie (NDB). Band 3, Duncker & Humblot, Berlin 1957, ISBN 3-428-00184-2, S. 29 (Digitalisat).
- Heinrich Hahn: Burghard. In: Allgemeine Deutsche Biographie (ADB). Band 3, Duncker & Humblot, Leipzig 1876, S. 564–566.
- Konrad Schäfer, Heinrich Schießer: Leben und Wirken des hl. Burkhard (= Bad Neustädter Beiträge zur Geschichte und Heimatkunde Frankens. Band 4). Bad Neustadt a. d. Saale 1986, ISBN 978-3-9800482-4-8.
- Heinrich Wagner: Würzburger Diözesan Geschichtsblätter (WDGB). Band 65, 2003 (Die Würzburger Bischöfe 741-842), S. 17-43.
- Alfred Wendehorst: Burchard (Nr. 14). In: Lexikon des Mittelalters (LexMA). Band 2, Artemis & Winkler, München/Zürich 1983, ISBN 3-7608-8902-6, Sp. 951.
