= Favorite (disambiguation) =

A favourite or favorite is the intimate companion of a ruler or other important person.

Favorite or favourite may also refer to:

== General meanings ==
- Internet bookmark or favorite
- In sports betting, the horse, team or person etc. thought most likely to win

== People ==
- Favorite (rapper) (born 1986), German rapper
- Eileen Favorite (born 1964)
- Malaika Favorite (born 1949), American visual artist and writer
- Marlon Favorite (born 1986), American football defensive tackle

== Places ==
- Favorite Channel
- Favorite Island, an island in Western Australia
- Favorite Palace, a former baroque palace and garden in Mainz
- Schloss Favorite (disambiguation)

== Vessels ==
- Favorite (Q195), an Aurore-class submarine of the French navy
- Favorite (steamboat), which operated in Oregon, United States, in the early 20th century
- HMS Favourite or Favorite, ships of the Royal Navy
- USS Favorite (SP-1385), a tugboat of the U.S. Navy
- French ship Favorite
- MV Favorite, an American excursion boat that capsized on July 28, 1927

== Music ==
- "Favorite" (Loona song), a 2018 song
- "Favourite" (song), a 2024 song by Fontaines D.C.
- "Favorite (Vampire)", a 2021 song by K-pop sub-unit group NCT 127

== See also ==
- The Favorite (disambiguation)
- Favorit (disambiguation)
- Favor (disambiguation)
- Favorites (disambiguation)
- Favorite Son (disambiguation)
- Favoritism (disambiguation)
- In-group favoritism, favoring members of one's own group
