= Favorit =

Favorit may refer to:

- Berliner Fußball-Club Favorit, a German football club succeeded by VfL Nord Berlin following World War II
- El Favorit, a Catalan spin-off of the TV show 100 Greatest Britons
- Favorit FM, a Romanian radio station operated by Centrul Național Media
- Favorit TV, a Romanian TV channel operated by Centrul Naţional Media
- S-300PMU-2 "Favorit", a type of S-300 system

== Transport ==
- Amazon Favorit, a cheaper model of the Volvo Amazon
- Avion F-1 Favorit, a light sporting biplane for aerobatics also known as the Avion MAI F-1
- Favorit (bicycle), a line of Czech bicycles
- Škoda Favorit, a line of Czech cars
- Adler Favorit, a passenger car introduced early in 1929 by the Frankfurt auto-maker, Adler

== See also ==
- Favorite (disambiguation)
- Favor (disambiguation)
- Favorites (disambiguation)
- Favorite Son (disambiguation)
