= Favor =

Favor, Favors, Favour or Favours (see spelling differences) may refer to:

== Arts and entertainment ==
=== Films ===
- The Favor (1994 film), an American romantic comedy directed by Donald Petrie
- The Favor (2006 film), a drama by Eva S. Aridjis

=== Television ===
- "Favors" (Mad Men), a television episode
- "The Favor" (Brooklyn Nine-Nine), a television episode

=== Music ===
- The Favours, an English indie rock band from Hull
- "Favor" (Lonny Bereal song), 2011
- "Favor" (Vindata, Skrillex and NSTASIA song), 2017
- "Favour (song)" (Fisher and Tones and I song), 2026

== People ==
- Donald Favor (1913–1984), American hammer thrower
- Edward M. Favor (1856–1936), American singer and vaudeville comedian
- Jack Favor (1911–1988), American rodeo performer
- John Favour (died 1624), Church of England divine
- Mike Favor (born 1966), American football player
- Suzy Favor Hamilton (born 1968), née Favor, American middle-distance runner
- Derrick Favors (born 1991), American basketball player
- Floyd Favors (born 1963), retired boxer from the United States
- Greg Favors (born 1974), former American football linebacker
- JoAnne Favors (born 1942), American politician
- Malachi Favors (1927–2004), American jazz bassist
- Favour Aniekan (born 1994), Nigerian footballer
- Favour Onukwuli (born 2005), English footballer

== See also ==
- Favorit (disambiguation)
- Favorite (disambiguation)
- Party Favor (disambiguation)
- Favor Delivery, a delivery company based in Austin, Texas
- Favor Peak, a mountain in Alaska
