= Schloss Favorite =

Schloss Favorite may refer to:

- Schloss Favorite, Ludwigsburg, a Baroque pleasure and hunting lodge in Ludwigsburg, Germany
- Schloss Favorite (Rastatt), a château in Rastatt-Förch, Germany
- Schloss Favorite (Mainz), a Baroque château that existed between 1722 and 1793 in Mainz, Germany

== See also ==
- Favorite (disambiguation)
- Favorita (disambiguation)
