= Favoritism =

Favoritism or favouritism may refer to:

- In-group favoritism, a pattern of favoring members of one's own group
  - Cronyism, partiality in awarding advantages to friends or trusted colleagues
  - Nepotism, favoritism granted to relatives and family members
- Outgroup favoritism, positive regard for groups to which one does not belong

== See also ==
- Ingroups and outgroups, social groups to which one identifies or does not identify as being a member
- Bias, inclination toward or against an individual, group, or ideology
- Favor (disambiguation)
- Favorite (disambiguation)
