= The Favorite =

The Favorite or The Favourite may refer to:

- The Favorite (1935 film), an Argentine musical film
- The Favorite (1976 film), a two-part film based on the novel Dead Cert
- The Favorite (1989 film), a Swiss-American drama film
- The Favourite (2018 film), a period black comedy film
- The Favorite (novel), a novel by Valentin Pikul, written in 1979-82
- "The Favourite" (song), a 1994 song by Directions In Groove
- The Favourite, Holland Park, a pub in London

== See also ==
- A Favorita, a 2008 Brazilian telenovela
- La Favorita or Stadio Renzo Barbera, a football stadium
- La Favorita (film), a 1952 Italian anthology film
- La favorite, an 1840 opera by Gaetano Donizetti
- La Favoritte, an early music ensemble
