= Fifth Wednesday Journal =

American literary magazine

- Editor: Vern Miller
- Categories: Literary journal
- Frequency: Bi-annually
- Publisher: Fifth Wednesday Books
- First issue: 2007
- Final issue: 2019
- Country: United States
- Language: English
- Website: www.fifthwednesdayjournal.com
- ISSN: 1939-733X

Fifth Wednesday Journal (FWJ) was a non-profit American literary magazine established in 2007 by Vern Miller that published fiction, essays, visual art, interviews, and book reviews both in print and online. Fifth Wednesday Journal was established in Lisle, Illinois. It ceased publication in 2019.

== History and background ==
The journal was founded in 2007 by a group of writers in Lisle, Illinois, who believed there was no magazine that represented the writers of Chicago within its suburbs. This group met every month that had a fifth Wednesday, and the first issue was published in fall of 2007. The group decided to use guest editors, changing with each issue, in order to achieve a wider aesthetic range in the magazine.

The journal was distributed in the Midwest, with content from established and new writers. Notable writers who contributed to the journal include American Book Award winner Luis Alberto Urrea, Richard Jones, Pushcart Prize winner Roger Reeves, and Shelley Memorial Award recipient Ed Roberson. More contributors of note included Sterling D. Plumpp, Laurence Lieberman, Elise Paschen, Stephen Dixon, Marge Piercy, Edith Pearlman, Rosellen Brown, Bob Hicok, Kim Addonizio, Dave Smith, Lynne Sharon Schwartz, Tony Hoagland, and Charles Wright. Contributing and guest editors included Illinois Poet Laureate Kevin Stein, Plimpton Prize winner Daniel Libman, Pushcart Prize winner Alice Mattison, Edie Meidav, Christine Sneed, Jeffery Renard Allen, Pam Houston, Donna Seaman, Bret Anthony Johnston, and Eileen Favorite. Interviews in the magazine included Pulitzer Prize winner Elizabeth Strout, Audrey Niffenegger, Monique Truong, Stuart Dybek, Richard Bausch, Stephen Dixon, Robert Coover and Ana Castillo.

FWJ received grants from the Illinois Arts Council Agency, MacArthur Fund for Arts and Culture at the Richard H. Driehaus Foundation, and Poets & Writers.

FWJ had selections in Pushcart Prize, The Best American Short Stories, The Best American Mystery Stories, The Best American Essays, and New Stories from the Midwest.

== See also ==
- List of literary magazines
