= Josef Bochníček =

Josef Bochníček may refer to:

- Josef Bochníček (gymnast) (1896–1969), Czech gymnast
- Josef Bochníček, head of the Czechoslovak bicycle factory Favorit
