= FWJ =

FWJ may refer to:

- Fifth Wednesday Journal, American literary magazine
- FWJ, abbreviation for Freiwilliges Jahr in der Wissenschaft (Voluntary Year in Science), apprenticeship programme at the Hannover Medical School
- Fourth World Journal, publication of the Center for World Indigenous Studies
