= Party Favor =

A party favor is a small gift given to guests.

Party Favor may also refer to:

- Party Favor (DJ), American DJ and electronic dance music producer
- Party Favor (My Little Pony), franchise product of My Little Pony
- "Party Favor" (song), a song by Billie Eilish
- "The Party Favor", 2006 television series episode from The O.C. season 3
- "Party Favors", a song by Tinashe from Nightride (album) (2016)
