= Mike Favor =

American football player (born 1966)

Profile
- Position: Center

Personal information
- Born: June 27, 1966 (age 60); Athens, Georgia, U.S.
- Listed height: 6 ft 1 in (1.85 m)
- Listed weight: 275 lb (125 kg)

Career information
- College: North Dakota State (1985–1988)
- College Football Hall of Fame (Class of 2011)

Mike Favor (born June 27, 1966 in Athens, Georgia) is an American college football former player. He played college football for the North Dakota State University. He was inducted to the College Football Hall of Fame in 2011.
