= Favorites (disambiguation) =

Favorites or Favourites refers to a saved list of internet bookmarks in the Internet Explorer browser.

Favorites or Favourites may also refer to:

- Favorites (Crystal Gayle album), 1980
- Favorites (Johnny Gill album), 1997
- Favorites (Jolin Tsai album), 2006
- Favourites, 1991 and 2001 albums by Ladysmith Black Mambazo
- Favorites, 1994 EP by Shonen Knife

== See also ==
- Favorite (disambiguation)
- Favorites and Rarities, a 1993 album by Don McLean
- Faves, an album by Renée Geyer
