= Richard Jones (poet) =

American poet

Richard Jones is an American poet born in London, England in 1953. He returned to the United States as a child and grew up on the East Coast, living in Virginia, North Carolina, Georgia, Massachusetts, and Nova Scotia. He received his B.A. and M.A. from the University of Virginia and an M.F.A. from Vermont College of Fine Arts. He is the author of twenty books of poetry, most recently Passport (Green Linden Press, 2025) and Stranger on Earth (Copper Canyon Press, 2018). His first book, Country of Air won the Posner Award in 1986. The Blessing: New and Selected Poems received the Midland Authors Award for Poetry for 2000. He won two Illinois Arts Council Literary Awards, first from Poetry magazine for "Song of the Old Man" in 1991 and then from TriQuarterly for "The Novel" in 1995. He is also the editor of the critical anthology Poetry and Politics (William Morrow and Company, 1985). Jones has given poetry readings at The Art Institute of Chicago, Beyond Baroque in Los Angeles, Shakespeare & Company in Paris, University of Heidelberg in Germany, The Chrysler Museum in Norfolk, Virginia, and the Hopkins Festival Ireland. Editor of the literary journal Poetry East, he has curated its many anthologies, including The Last Believer in Words, Bliss, Origins, Wider than the Sky, and London. He is professor of English at DePaul University in Chicago.

== Selected works ==
=== Poetry ===
- ’’Country of Air’’ (Copper Canyon Press, 1986)
- ’’At Last We Enter Paradise’’ (Copper Canyon Press, 1991)
- ’’A Perfect Time’’ (Copper Canyon Press, 1994)
- ’’48 Questions’’ (Tebot Bach Books, 1998)
- ’’The Blessing: New and Selected Poems’’ (Copper Canyon Press, 2000)
- ’’Apropos of Nothing’’ (Copper Canyon Press, 2006)
- ’’The Correct Spelling & Exact Meaning’’ (Copper Canyon Press, 2010)
- ’’The Obscure Hours: Translation’’ (East of Eden Press, 2018)
- ’’Stranger on Earth’’ (Copper Canyon Press, 2018)
- ’’Avalon’’ (Green Linden Press, 2020)
- ’’Paris’’ (Tebot Bach Books, 2021)
- ’’The Minor Key’’ (Green Linden Press, 2021)
- ’’Passport’’ (Green Linden Press, 2025)

=== Poetry limited editions ===
- ’’Windows and Walls’’ (Adastra Press, 1982)
- ’’Innocent Things’’ (Adastra Press, 1985)
- ’’Walk On’’ (Alderman Press, 1986)
- ’’Sonnets’’ (Adastra Press, 1990)
- ’’The Abandoned Garden’’ (Tunheim Santrizos, 1997)
- ’’The Stone It Lives On’’ (Adastra Press, 2000)
- ’’King of Hearts’’ (Adastra Press, 2015)

=== Anthologies edited (selected volumes) ===
- ’’The Last Believer in Words’’ (Poetry East, #45 & 46, 1998)
- ’’Bliss’’ (Poetry East, #60, Autumn 2007)
- ’’Wider Than the Sky’’ (Poetry East, #70, Spring 2011)
- ’’Origins’’ (Poetry East, #79, Spring 2013)
- ’’Abandoned Houses’’ (Poetry East, #82, Spring 2014)
- ’’Paris’’ (Poetry East, #83, Autumn 2014)
- ’’London’’ (Poetry East, #87, Spring 2016)
- ’’Kyoto’’ (Poetry East, #88 & 89, Autumn 2016)
- ’’The Bliss of Reading’’ (Poetry East, #100, Autumn 2020)
- ’’Poetry & Paintings’’ (Poetry East, #112, Autumn 2025)
