= The Favours =

British Indie rock band

- Origin: Hull, England
- Genres: Rock post-Britpop; Alternative rock
- Years active: 2002–2009
- Labels: Filthy Little Angels; Stonetrax
- Past members: Sara Sanchez (vocals and guitar); Chris Marsay (guitar); Martin Knight (bass); Dave "Mister Nivelles" (drums); Andy (guitar); Carl (drums)
- Website: www.thefavours.co.uk

The Favours were a four-piece indie rock band from Kingston upon Hull, England.

== Biography ==
Formed in November 2002, The Favours appeared on the UK music scene in 2003 with a series of gigs, followed up by self-released album Magpies Revenge in the summer of 2004. A split EP, featuring tracks "Kill" and "Out of Control", was released by the Lancashire based label, Filthy Little Angels, in August 2004.

After reforming with a new line-up in March 2005, the band played the Unsigned Stage at Leeds Festival in August 2005. After three gigs in Belgium, from November 2005 through to January 2006 the band toured America with The Wrens, including sold-out gigs at New York's Bowery Ballroom, and at The Northstar Bar in Philadelphia; followed up with another gig at the 'Pianos' as the headline act. They finished out 2005 and started 2006 at The Onion indie festival 'War on Christmas Party'.

The Favours toured with The Wrens on a UK tour in early 2006, ending with a sell-out show at London's ULU; followed in July 2006 with additional gigs in Germany and Belgium. The Favours were selected for the 'Next Stage' by BBC Radio Humberside's Raw Talent for the Electric Proms in Camden in October 2006.

They have appeared on a BBC 'This is what we do' trailer on BBC One, BBC Two and BBC Three; which promoted BBC 6 Music. It features film clips from the band's original regional appearances in 2003, clips from BBC Radio Humberside's 'Raw Talent' show, making the "Islands" video and playing the BBC Electric Proms festival.

The single "Islands" was released on 17 September 2007 in the UK. The b-side was "One Up on You".

The band split up in 2009.
