= La Favoritte =

Canadian orchestra

- Early music ensemble
- Founded: 2002
- Location: Ottawa, Ontario, Canada
- Website: www.lafavoritte.com

La Favoritte is an early music ensemble, founded in 2002, that has specialized in the performance of Baroque music on period instruments. The ensemble also enjoys stretching the bounds of its repertoire to include Medieval, Renaissance and contemporary works. The special focus of La Favoritte is the music of women composers, and the musical traditions of early Canada; great artists from ages past, including Élisabeth Jacquet de La Guerre and Barbara Strozzi, as well as the Augustine and Ursuline Nuns of New France. Since its inception as a trio, La Favoritte has grown to a larger ensemble frequently performing as a full-sized Baroque orchestra including winds, brass, and timpani. La Favoritte is a supporter of Ottawa's new chamber music concert hall in partnership with The Ottawa Chamber Music Society (www.chamberfest.com) through the Online Auction for the Arts.

In June 2003 the ensemble made its international debut at the prestigious Boston Early Music Festival. La Favoritte has performed on CBC, CTV and TV Ontario and has collaborated with groups such as Seventeen Voyces and Musica Divina in highly praised performances.

The current members are Lise Maisonneuve, Madeleine Owen, Barbara Zuchowicz, Kevin James, and Johanne Couture.

== Name origin ==
Their name, La Favoritte, is derived from an 18th-century piece for viola da gamba by the French composer, Charles Dollé. The piece is partly French and partly Italian in spirit, reflecting both the musical fashion of the day, Les goût réunis (the unified style), and the ensemble's musical interests.
