= French ship Favorite =

No less than 21 ships of the French Navy have borne the name Favorite (Favourite). Among them:

- Favorite (1678), launched 1678, captured by the Dutch Navy in 1694
- Favorite (1747), launched 1747, hulked 1757
- Favorite (1810) (1810–1811), a 44-gun frigate destroyed at the Battle of Lissa
- Favorite (Q195), an Aurore-class submarine launched in 1938. Seized by Germany in 1940 and renamed UF-2 she was scuttled in 1945
