= The Favourite, Holland Park =

Pub in London, England

Coordinates: 51.5086°N 0.2159°W

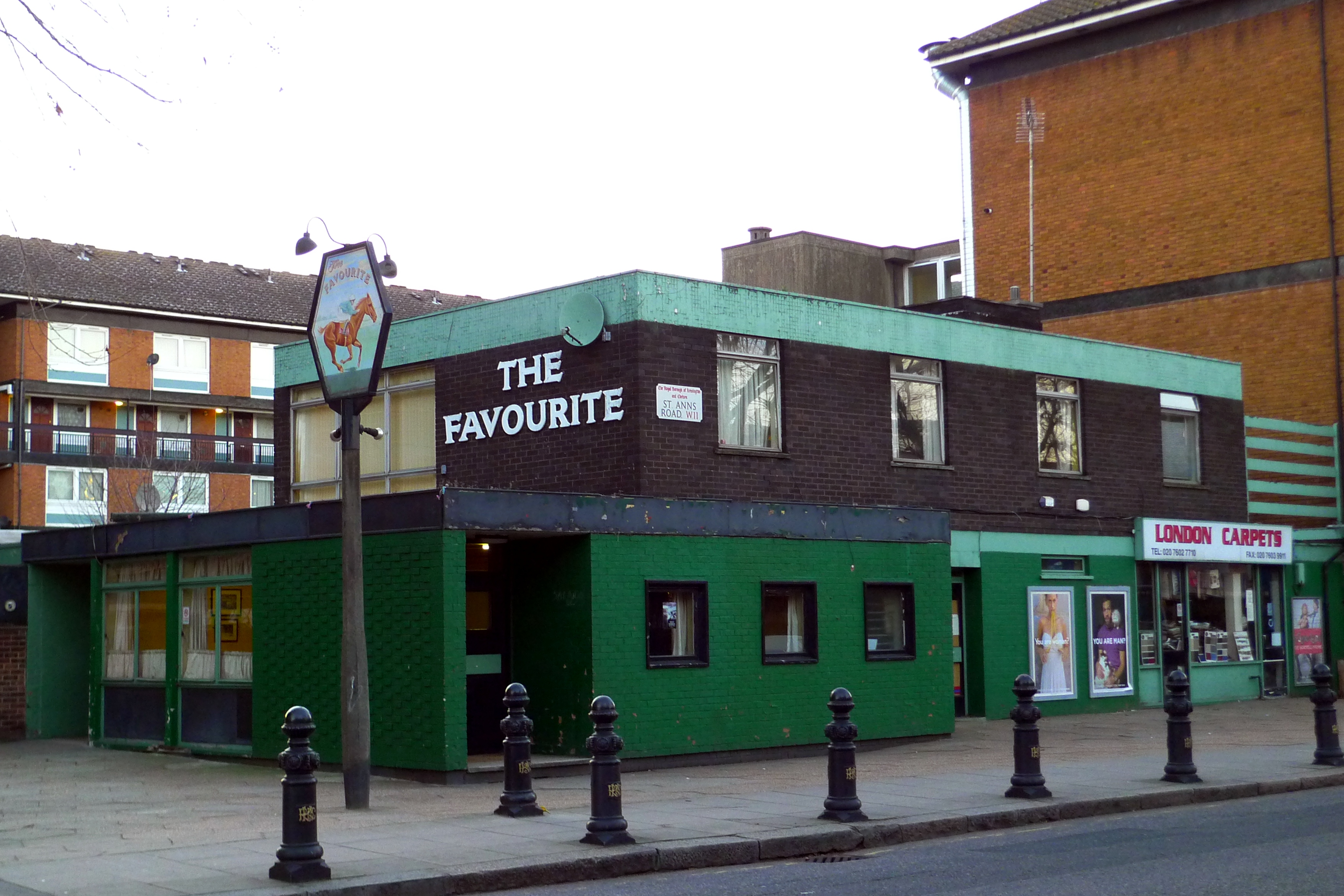
The Favourite

The Favourite was a pub at 27 St Anns Road, Holland Park, London W11, that closed in 2011. A pub had existed on the site since at least 1879. The building was demolished and replaced by a six-storey block of studio flats around 2012.

== History ==
It was originally called the Duke of Sussex and dated back to at least 1879, and the street itself was previously known as Latimer Road. It was rebuilt some time after World War II. The pub closed in 2011. It had been owned by Enterprise Inns, and before that by Watney Combe & Reid.

== Demolition ==
The building was listed for sale by AG&G ("one of the UK’s leading specialists in licensed leisure property") for offers "in excess of £1,800,000".

In May 2012, it was being marketed by Goldcrest Land plc for £2.2–2.4 million, with a "Full Detailed Planning Application" having been made for a "six storey building comprising 84 student housing studios" plus a retail unit on the ground floor.

The pub was demolished, and the site is now occupied by Yara Central, Holland Park, student accommodation in studio flats for 84 students, owned by Yara Capital. Rents range from £14,200 to £15,300 per year.
