= Favorita =

Favorita may refer to:

- Favorita (grape), an Italian grape variety
- A Favorita, a popular and award-winning telenovela, first broadcast in Brazil at Rede Globo in 2008
- La Favorita or Stadio Renzo Barbera, a football stadium
- La Favorita (film), a 1952 Italian anthology film
