= Favorit (bicycle) =

Czechoslovak bicycle manufacturer

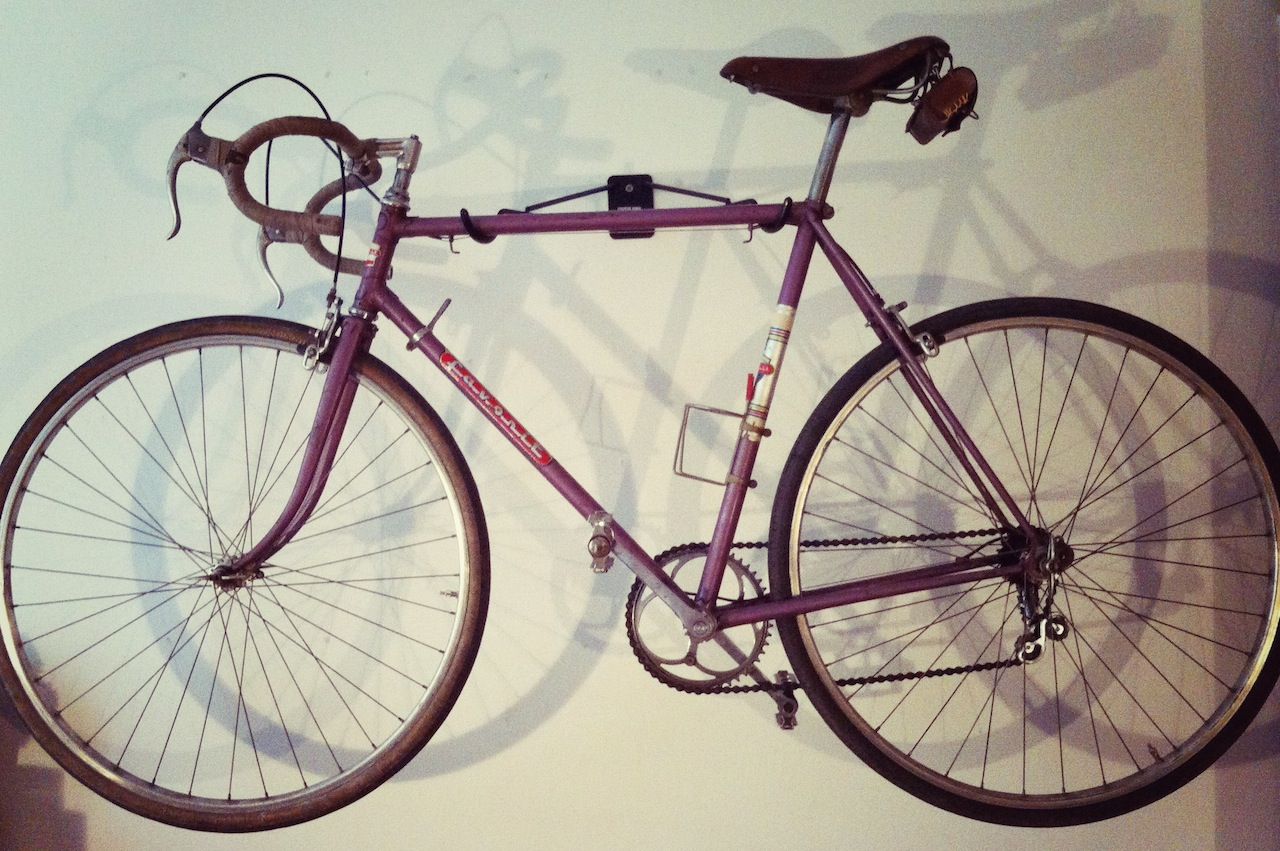
Favorit bicycle

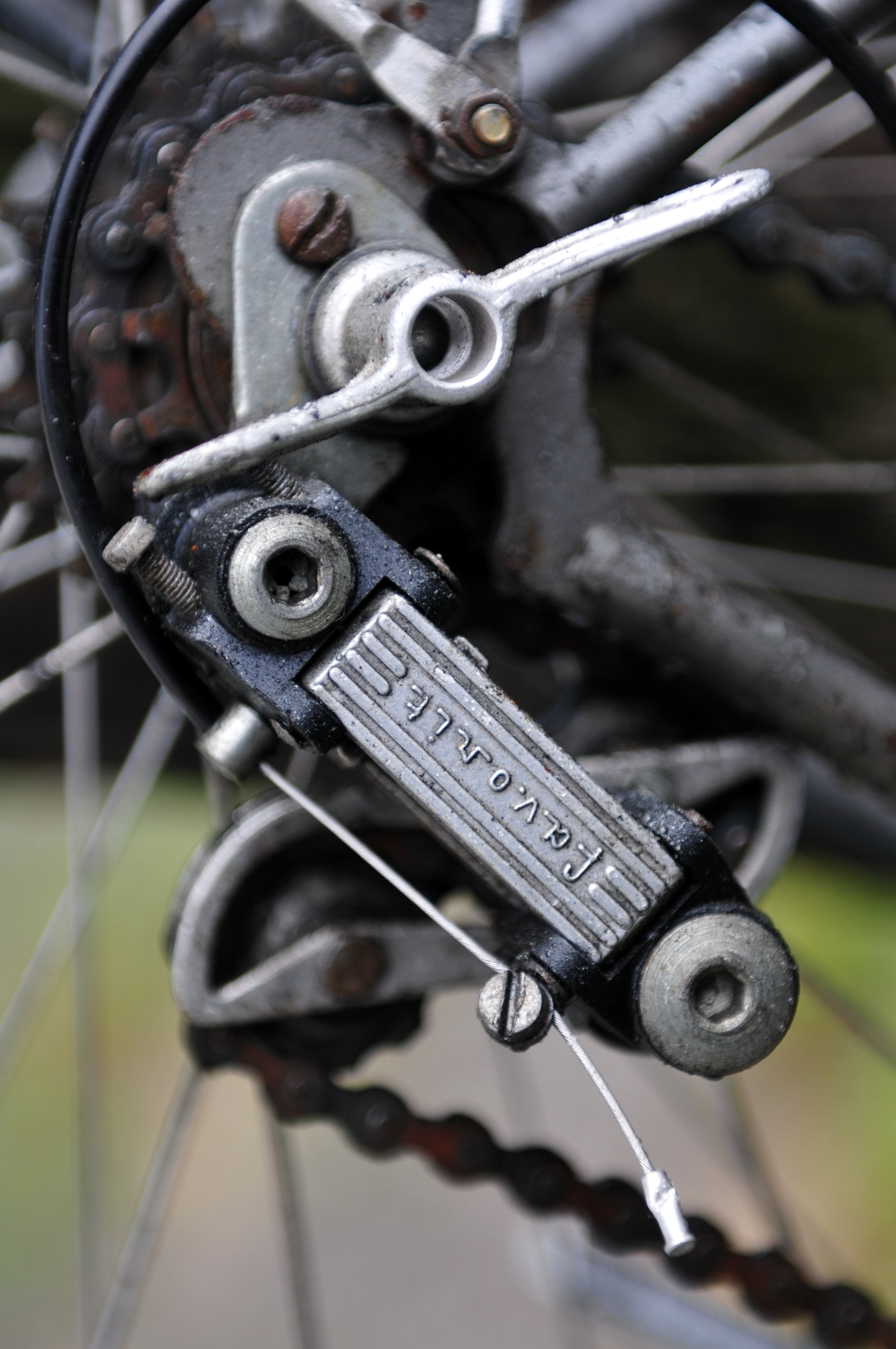
Favorit-branded derailleur

Favorit was a Czechoslovak brand of bicycles manufactured in Rokycany.

== History ==
The factory in Rokycany was founded in 1922 by František Hering together with Heinrich Kastrup and Ambros Swetlik, founders of Es-Ka, another bicycle manufacturer from Cheb. The factory was manufacturing bicycles branded Tripol until 1934, when the company was split into two. The manufacturing of Tripol was moved to a newly build factory. The old factory remained to Hering, who founded his own brand, Tudor. In 1948, both factories have been nationalised and made part of the state-owned ČZ Strakonice. Following a reorganisation in 1950, factories were made part of the newly created state-owned company Eska Cheb. Since two previously factories were making bicycles of two distinct brands, in 1951 the head of the company Josef Bochníček, suggested a new brand for the united company, Favorit.
