= Favorite Son (disambiguation) =

Favorite son refers to a politician with strong regional or party support.

Favorite Son may also refer to:

- Favorite Son (miniseries), a 1988 American TV miniseries
- "Favorite Son" (Star Trek: Voyager), an episode of the American TV series Star Trek: Voyager
- "Favorite Son", an episode of the American sitcom Yes, Dear
- "Favorite Son", a song by Green Day from their 2004 promo single "American Idiot"
- "Favorite Son", a song from the 1991 musical The Will Rogers Follies
- The Favourite Son, a 1994 film

== See also ==
- Favourite Sons, an American indie rock band
