= Eileen Favorite =

American writer and teacher

Eileen Favorite (born September 10, 1964, in Chicago) is an American writer and teacher living in Chicago, Illinois. She received a B.A. in English with a French concentration from the University of Illinois, Urbana. In 1999, she received an MFA in writing from the School of the Art Institute of Chicago.

== Novel ==
Favorite's first novel, The Heroines, was published in 2007 by Scribner. It has been translated into Italian, Korean, Russian (in press), and Finnish. The Rocky Mountain News called The Heroines one of the best debut novels of 2008, and the audio version was nominated for best audio recording of 2008 by Booklist.

== Other works ==
Her poems and essays have also appeared in Poetry East, The Chicago Reader, Rhino, Midnight Mind and have aired on Chicago Public Radio (WBEZ). She also has participated in guest interviews directly on WBEZ as well. She's received Illinois Arts Council Fellowships in both poetry and prose.

== Awards ==
Favorite won Illinois Arts Council Fellowships in 2001 (for prose) and 2005 (for poetry).
