= Favorite Palace =

Former palace and baroque garden in Mainz, Germany

Coordinates: 49°59′42″N 8°16′57″E

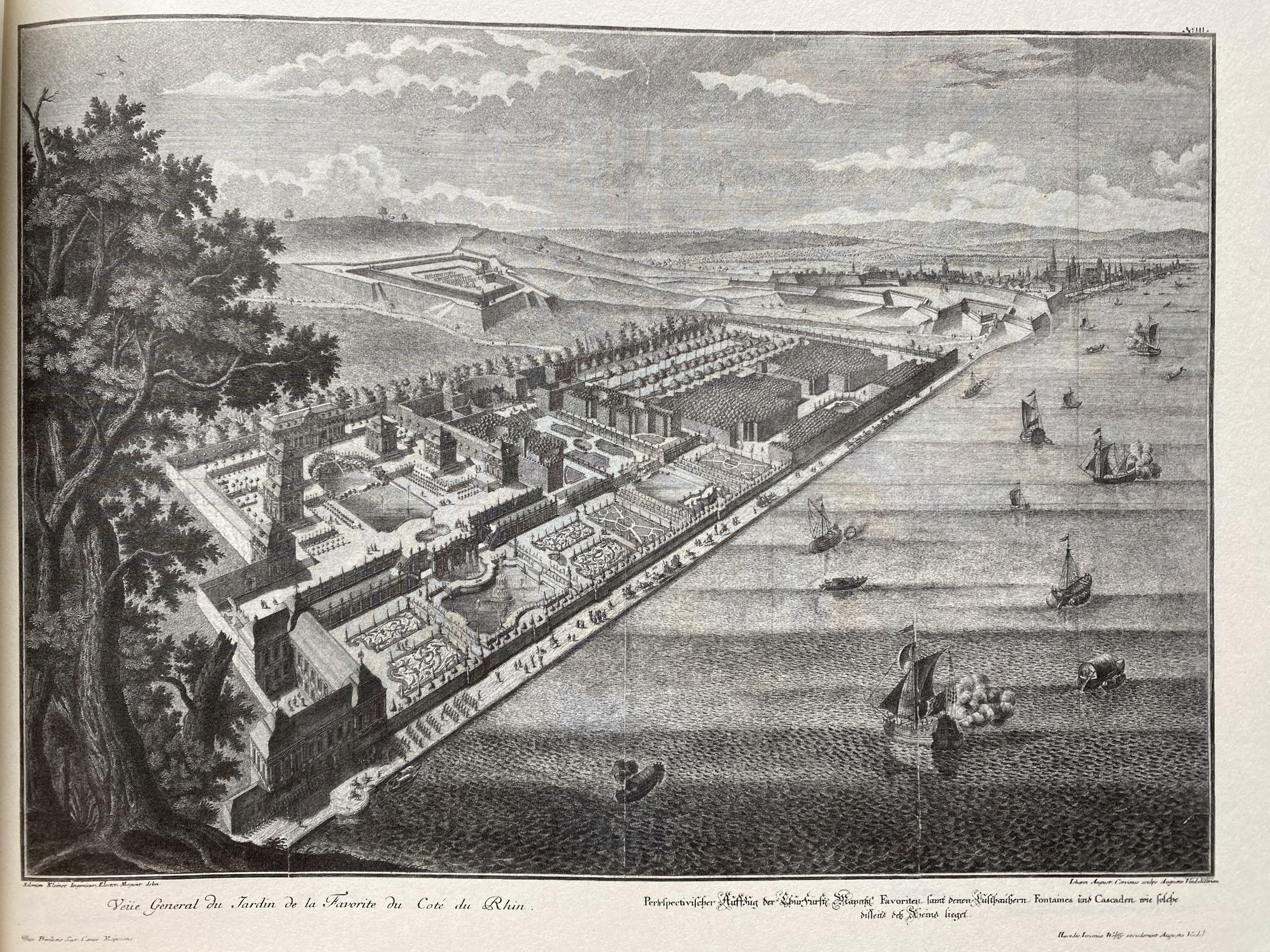
Engraving of the Favorite Palace by Salomon Kleiner (1726)

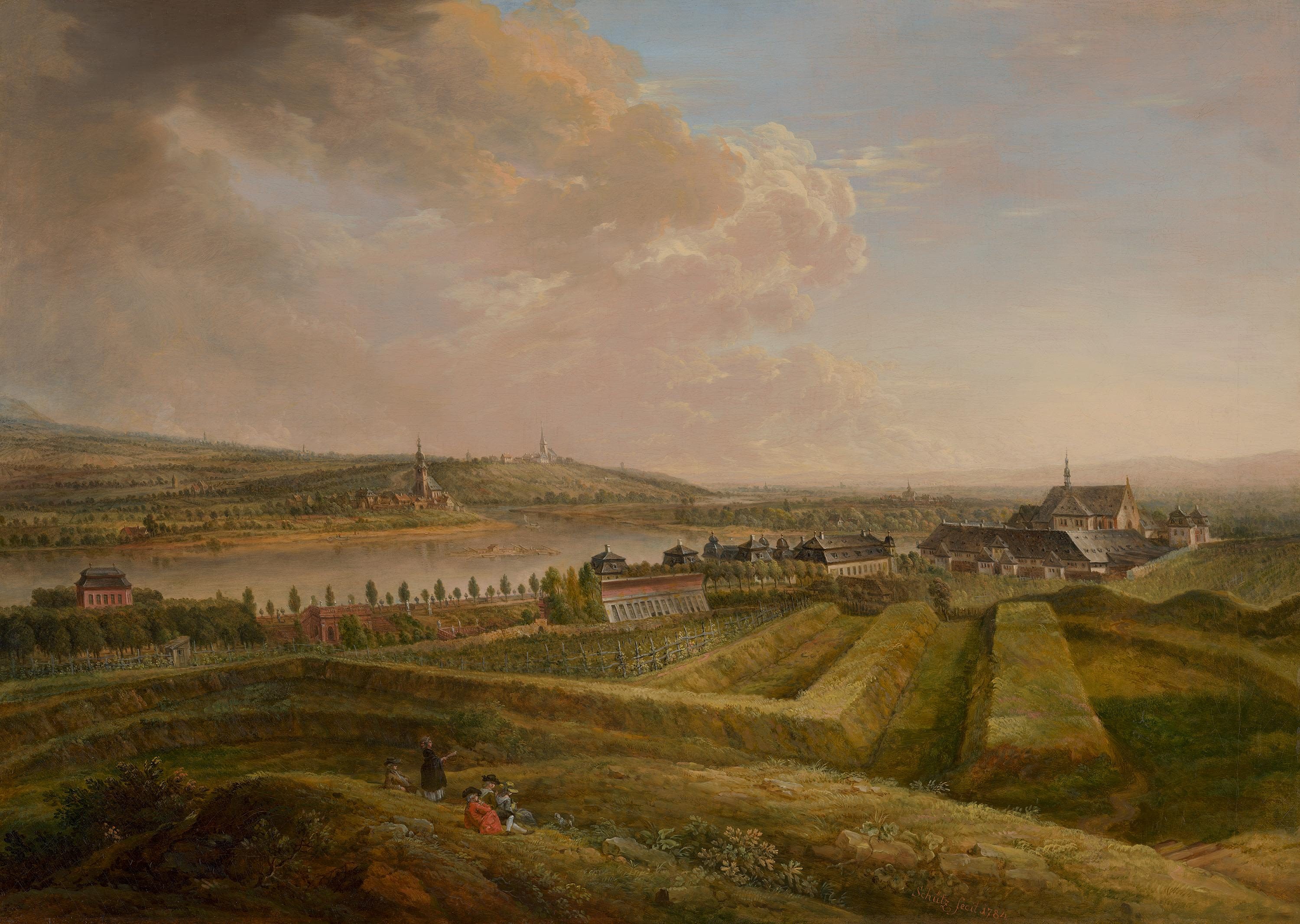
The Favorite Palace by Christian Georg Schütz the Elder (1784)

The Favorite Palace (German: Lustschloss Favorite) (often simply called the Favorite) on the banks of the Rhine in Mainz was a significant Baroque palace complex in the Electorate of Mainz, featuring elaborate gardens and water features. The Favorite was built in several stages, starting in the year 1700. It was essentially completed around the year 1722. Its patron, Lothar Franz von Schönborn (1655–1729), Prince-elector of Mainz and Prince-Bishop of Bamberg, came from one of the most prominent Franconian-Middle Rhine noble families of the time, the Schönborn family, and was the patron of many Baroque gardens and palaces. The Lustschloss Favorite was completely destroyed during the Siege of Mainz in 1793 in the French Revolutionary Wars.

The model for the complex was the French palace of the Château de Marly of Louis XIV. The Favorite palace, with its further development of the formalistic early Baroque garden design in the style of the Palace of Versailles, is considered a model for many other gardens that emerged later in the subsequent late Baroque era of garden art.

== History ==
=== The history before the Favorite was constructed ===
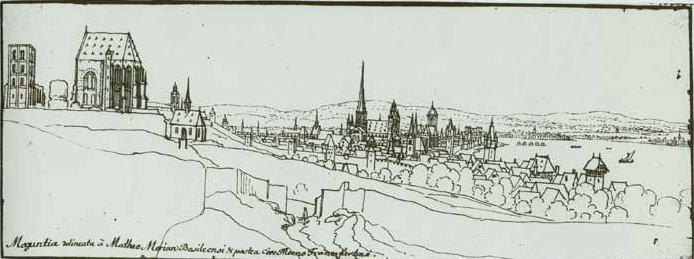
View of Mainz from the southeast, showing St. Alban's to the left with choir and tower, next to the Drusus cenotaph. Pen drawing by Wenceslaus Hollar (1631)

The site of the Favorite palace is located directly on the banks of the Rhine opposite the mouth of the Main and south of the medieval fortress ring outside the gates of Mainz. It was already used as a place for gardens in the Middle Ages: There was the older abbot's garden as well as the collegiate garden of the later Saint Alban's Abbey outside Mainz. St. Alban was looted and completely destroyed by the troops of Margrave Albrecht Alcibiades of Brandenburg-Kulmbach on the evening of 28 August 1552, during the Second Margrave War.

In 1672, baron Christoph Rudolf von Stadion (1638–1700), acquired the collegiate garden. After he was able to acquire the adjacent abbot's garden in 1692, he united both gardens. At the end of the 17th century, Stadion was an important figure in the Electorate of Mainz: he was President of the Court Council, Provost of the cathedral, Provost of St. Alban, and himself multiple times a candidate for the office of Prince-elector. He also wanted to build a stately Baroque pleasure garden in the emerging fashion of the time. From the merged older gardens emerged a five-hectare utility and pleasure garden in the High Baroque style with a single-story Rhine mansion, utility buildings, vineyards, as well as fruit and ornamental trees, known as the Stadion Garden.

After Stadion's death in 1700, the property was acquired from his heirs by Lothar Franz von Schönborn, who had been elected Elector of Mainz only six years earlier, for 16,500 Reichsthaler. The approximately 400-meter-long and 140-meter-wide garden complex was to become the core piece of the Lustschloss Favorite planned by him.

=== Construction of the Favorite ===
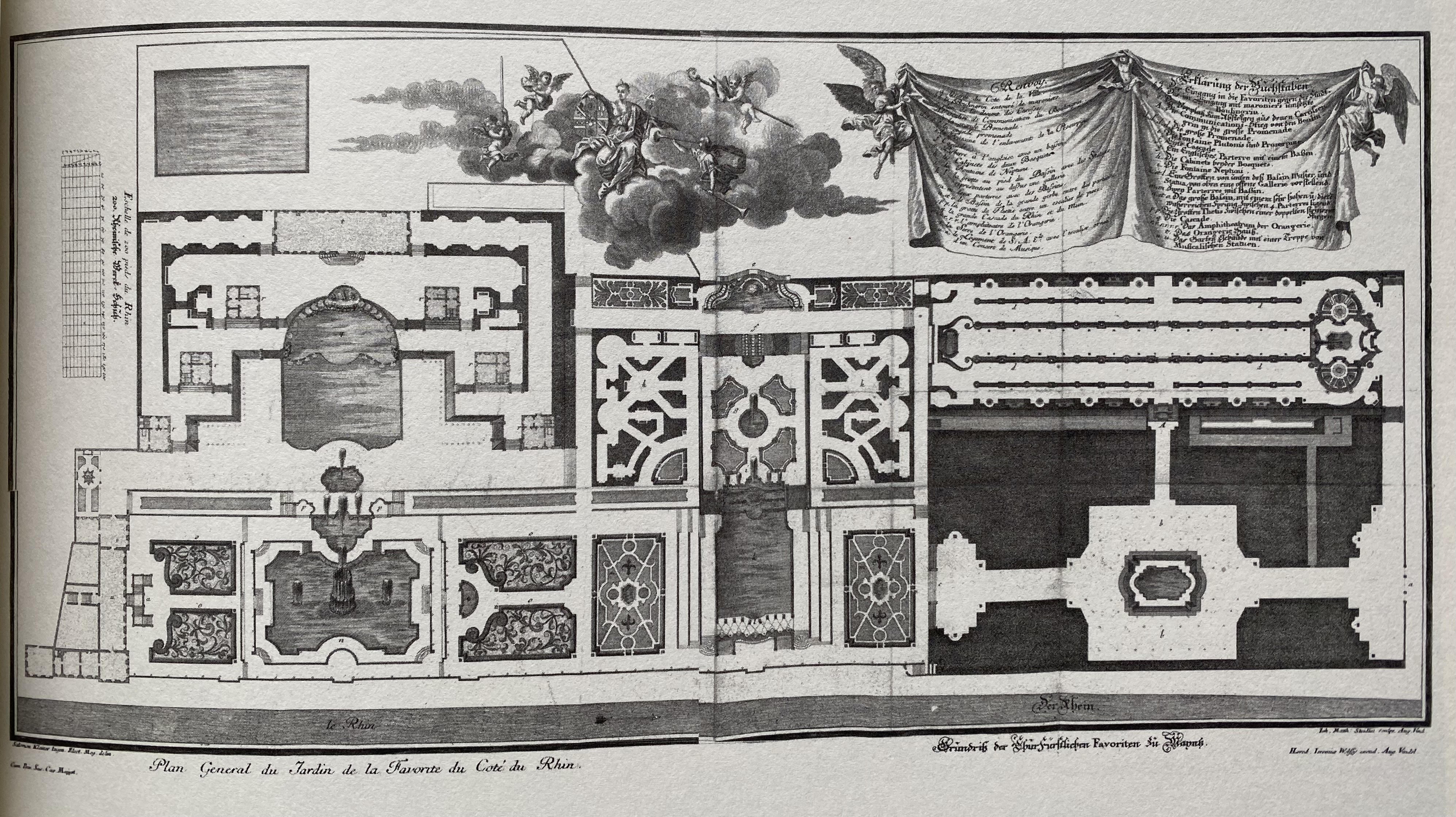
Plan of the Favorite Palace by Salomon Kleiner (1726)

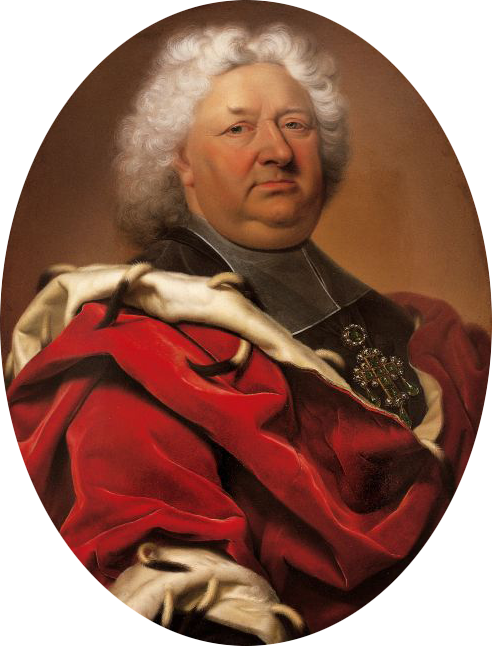
Lothar Franz von Schönborn, Prince-elector of Mainz and Prince-bishop of Bamberg

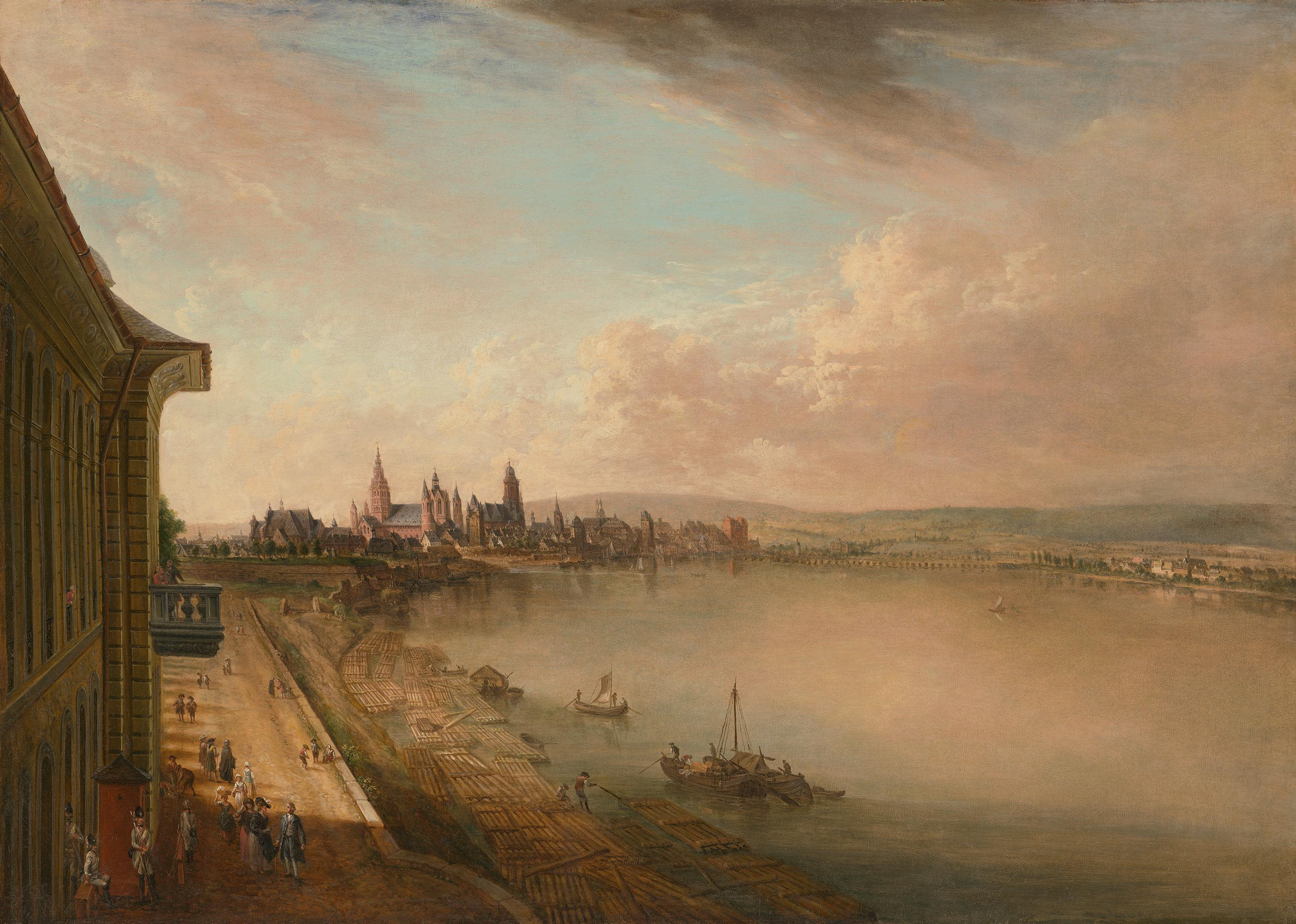
View of Mainz with the Favorite Palace on the left by Christian Georg Schütz the Elder (1784)

When Lothar Franz von Schönborn was elected Prince-elector of Mainz in 1694, a Baroque golden age began for the city of Mainz, not only in terms of urban development. Schönborn, from a prominent Middle Rhine-Franconian noble family, the Schönborn family, epitomized the ideal of an absolutist ruler who loved splendor. At the same time, as he noted in a moment of self-awareness, like many other members of the Schönborn family, he was possessed by the building bug (German: Bauwurmb). In his extensive surviving private correspondence, the following saying of his is recorded: "Building is a pleasure and costs a lot of money, every fool likes his own cap."

As Prince-elector of Mainz, Lothar Franz planned a representative Baroque pleasure garden for his residence city. The name was inspired by the Habsburg palace Favorita near Vienna, a tribute by the Prince-elector and Archchancellor of the Holy Roman Empire to the Habsburg ruling house, with which he had close political ties. Architecturally, the model was Marly-le-Roi, built between 1680 and 1686, so Schönborn liked to call his pleasure palace Favorite "le petit Marly" (English: the small Marly). Due to his extensive construction activities and the often simultaneous large construction projects in his ecclesiastical principalities, Schönborn could draw on a large number of skilled builders for the construction of the Favorite. He jokingly and respectfully referred to them as "my clever construction-directing gods."

The architects and fortress builders Nikolaus Person and Maximilian von Welsch were at his disposal. They left the gardening work to the chief gardener Johann Kaspar Dietmann, whose horticultural expertise was highly valued by the Elector and utilized in other locations as well. In artistic and design matters, they worked closely with the "courtier-architect" Philipp Christoph von und zu Erthal, the builder of the eponymous Erthaler Hof. A fourth involved architect was Freiherr von Rotenhan, who also served as the chief stable master in the Elector's service. In the later construction and renovation phase (from 1725), influences from Anselm Franz von Ritter zu Groenesteyn, known as the "courtier-architect," and, through his mediation, the Parisian court architect Germain Boffrand were added to the design of the Favorite. For the complex waterworks, Schönborn enlisted the famous builder Abraham Huber from Salzburg in 1724, whom he respectfully and humorously called "neptunum abrahamum."

=== First construction phase (1700–1722) ===
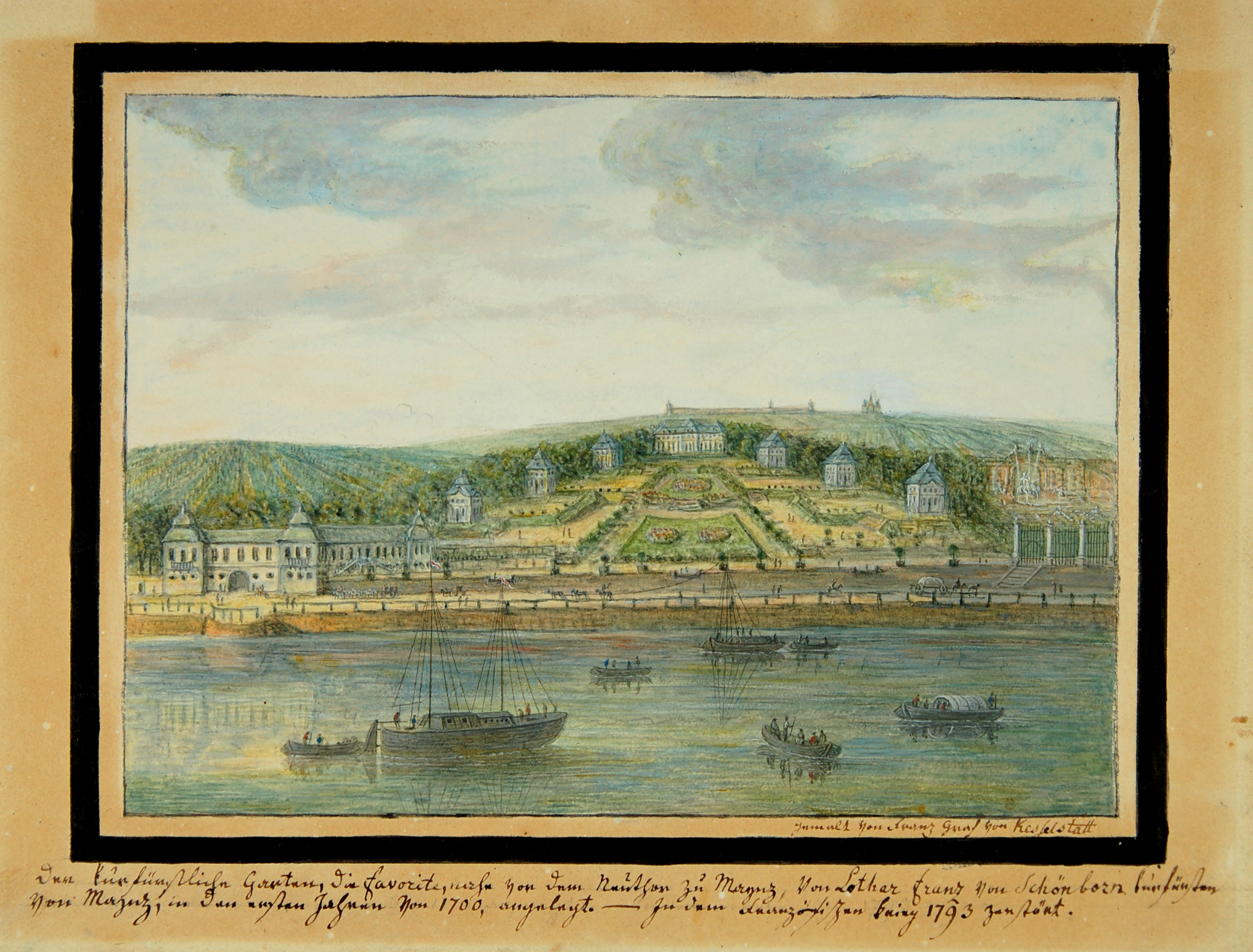
View of the Favorite Palace by Franz von Kesselstatt (1793)

After acquiring the Stadion Garden in 1700, Schönborn immediately began expanding the complex. His architects initially followed the orientation of the previous garden and aligned it along the Rhine towards Mainz. The first complex consisted of a main building, a single-story Rhine mansion with two wings. This building, whose narrow side also contained the main entrance, was situated directly on the Rhine, separated only by a driveway. This building was used as a concert and dining hall.

This was followed by a narrow garden with sculptures from the previous garden, whose main axis also pointed towards Mainz. The complex, which essentially retained the form and extent of the Stadion Garden, existed in this form until about 1705. From around 1708 (definitively proven from 1710), the electoral fortress builder Maximilian von Welsch was permanently involved in the construction project.

Until 1714, further construction progressed only slowly. The War of Spanish Succession from 1701 to 1714 indirectly posed a threat to Mainz from the French, especially since the complex was outside the fortress ring. Additionally, this conflict significantly strained the resources of the Electorate, causing Lothar Franz von Schönborn to partially put his most important Mainz construction project on hold. However, remaining invoices reveal that the work on the Favorite had already cost Schönborn 93,641 Guilders and 58 Kreuzer by 1710. Larger plant purchases were also reported for the early years. The 1702 annual report shows 6,000 hornbeams from the Spessart, Taxus bushes, and chestnut trees, which were used for the design of the Boulingrin in the northernmost part of the garden, making it one of the oldest garden sections created under Schönborn.

Nevertheless, the large water terraces of the lower parterre and the main parterre above it were completed in 1711/1712. From 1717, the construction of the actual palace complex followed at the upper end of the main parterre, as seen from the Rhine. Originally planned as the central building of the complex, the palace now assumed the function of a splendid orangery. In 1717/1718, Welsch also expanded the main parterre with its six semicircularly arranged cavalier houses. The Prince-elector commissioned his court sculptor Franz Matthias Hiernle with the figurative decoration of the individual facilities. The two large garden areas adjoining the right of the main parterre were laid out by 1722.

By around 1722, the Favorite palace, with its buildings, water features, and various gardens, was preliminarily completed as a coherent complex. Prince-elector Lothar Franz von Schönborn and his successors used the Favorite from then on for representation purposes and for festivities of the electoral court. A series of 14 copper engravings of the Favorite, made between 1723 and 1726 by Salomon Kleiner, an electoral court engineer and talented copper engraver (now partially in the possession of the Landesmuseum Mainz), shows the complex in detail but often exaggeratedly in perspective, with its various aspects after its completion. An anonymous contemporary report describes the impressive effect of the festive complex on the viewer:

"The ascending structure of the Favorite never appeared more magnificent than by night illumination. When one traveled on the Rhine from Kostheim during such festivities, it seemed as if a luminous fairy-tale castle lay ahead, reflecting a brilliant image in a thousand flickers on the smooth water surface. The six pavilions rising to the height of the Alban rampart looked like burning palaces. The balconies and facades seemed carved from diamonds; the water features hurled sparkling gemstones against the dark night sky. The groups of trees and avenues cast a dazzling green, and amidst all this splendor, joyful people mingled under the beautiful music.

=== Second construction phase (1722–1735) ===
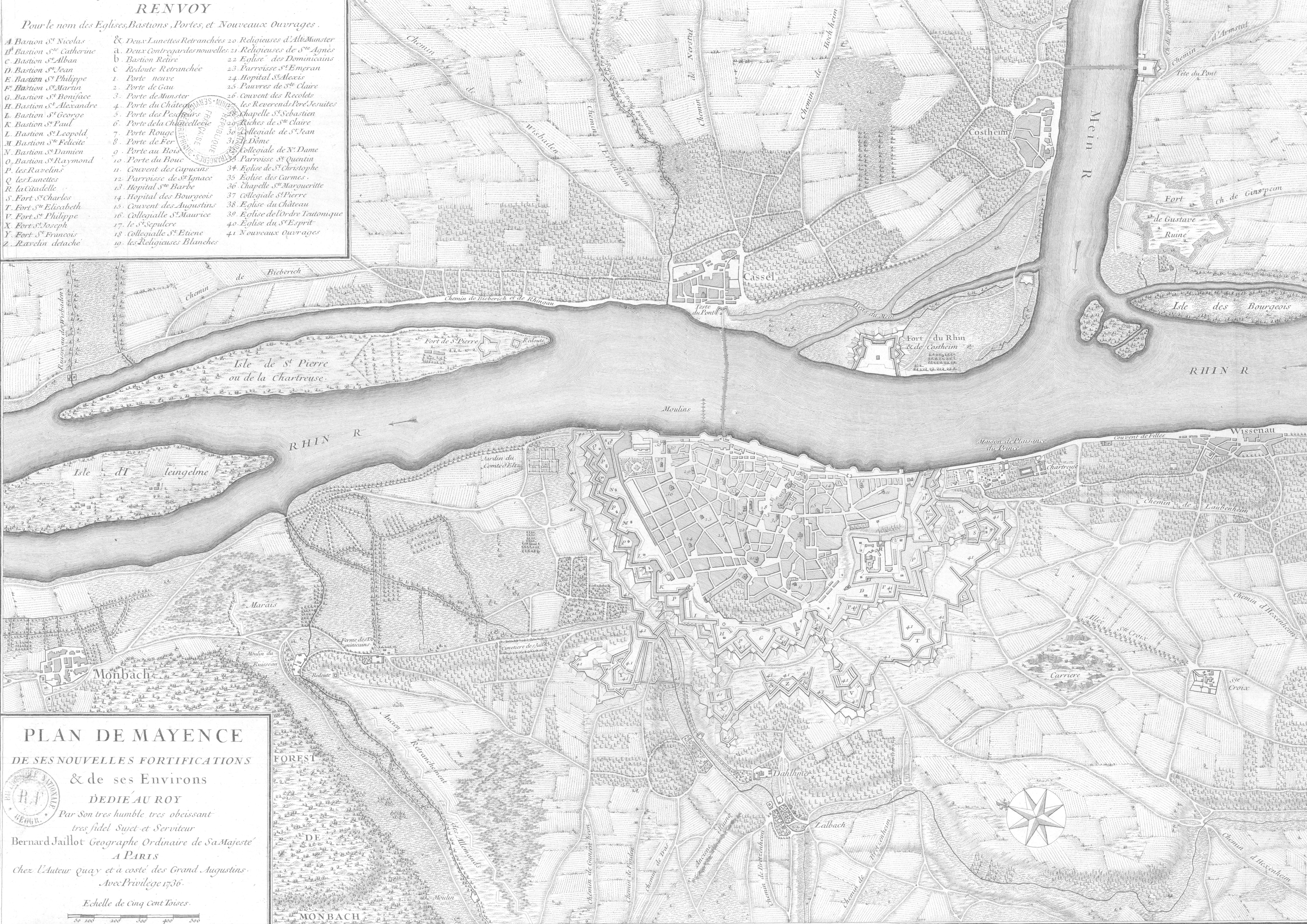
Plan of Mainz with Favorite Palace laying right next to the city on the banks of the river Rhine (1736)

During the reign of Prince-elector Francis Louis of Palatinate-Neuburg (1729–1732), the last major expansion of the Favorite took place. The northern part, the so-called Boulingrin with its extensive horse chestnut promenades, was redesigned. A garden house oriented towards the Rhine, the so-called Porcelain House, was built there. Since the Porcelain Manufactory in Höchst near Frankfurt am Main belonged to the Electorate of Mainz from 1746 onwards, the Porcelain House and other buildings of the Favorite were furnished with products from the manufactory in the later period of the complex. It is also said that the interior of the building itself was tiled in white and blue. The architect was Anselm Franz Freiherr von Ritter zu Groenesteyn (also: zu Gruenstein), who was trained in Paris. However, it is highly likely that Lothar Franz von Schönborn had already planned this expansion and had started construction before his death in 1729.

=== Further extensions and conversions until 1790 ===
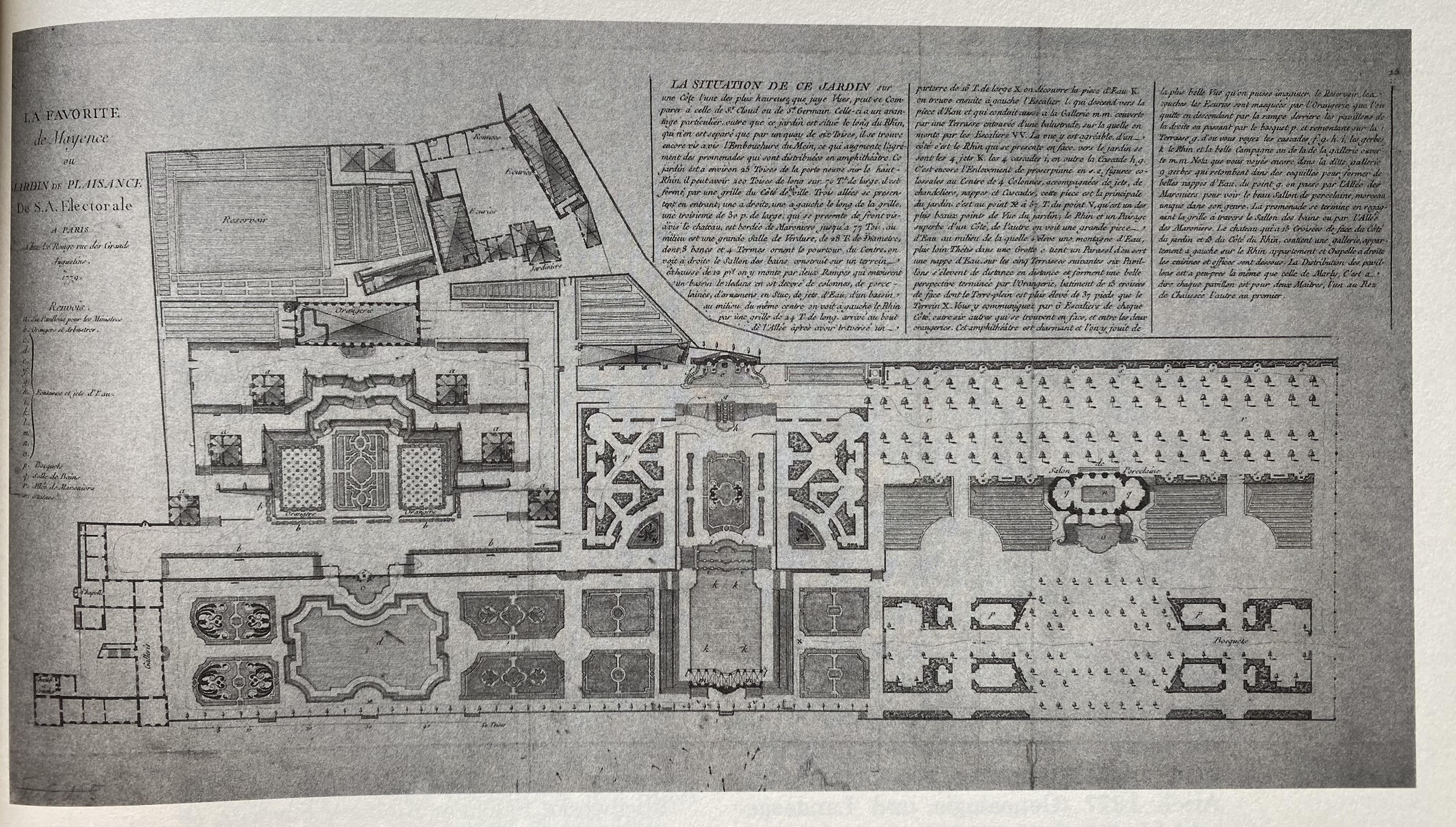
Plan of the Favorite Palace (1779)

After the redesign of the northern part of the Favorite, there were no larger or significant construction projects. For practical reasons, additional stables and utility buildings were built in the western part of the complex away from the Rhine, but these did not affect the artistic aspect of the complex. More significant for the external appearance of the Favorite, however, was the replacement of numerous water basins and installations with purely horticultural facilities. It is likely that the fountains created for the water installations of the Favorite were not capable of providing the necessary amount of water in the long term.

In 1746, Anselm Franz Freiherr von Ritter zu Groenesteyn worked on the orangery once again. The last landscaping work on the Favorite was carried out around 1788–1790 by the renowned garden architect Friedrich Ludwig von Sckell, with changes to the now expanded complex in the new " English landscape garden style." Sckell was originally commissioned to "design the surroundings of the Mainz Favorite in a natural taste." However, Sckell largely respected the old garden's existing structure. After his alterations, which effectively led to two stylistically different adjacent garden complexes, he summarized: "...so that now both in the future will not dispute each other's merits; each will stand on its own and be admired without the other's contribution." The work on the garden complexes of the Favorite, however, did not progress beyond an early initial stage. Sckell's plans for the redesign, however, influenced the planning of the Neue Anlage in the 1820s.

Further-reaching plans after 1790, such as the expansion of the Rhine mansion or the extension of the Favorite after the purchase of the neighboring land of the Mainz Charterhouse (where a 70-meter-long garden hall was planned), were started but not completed due to the political situation.

== Design: the gardens ==
=== The park ===
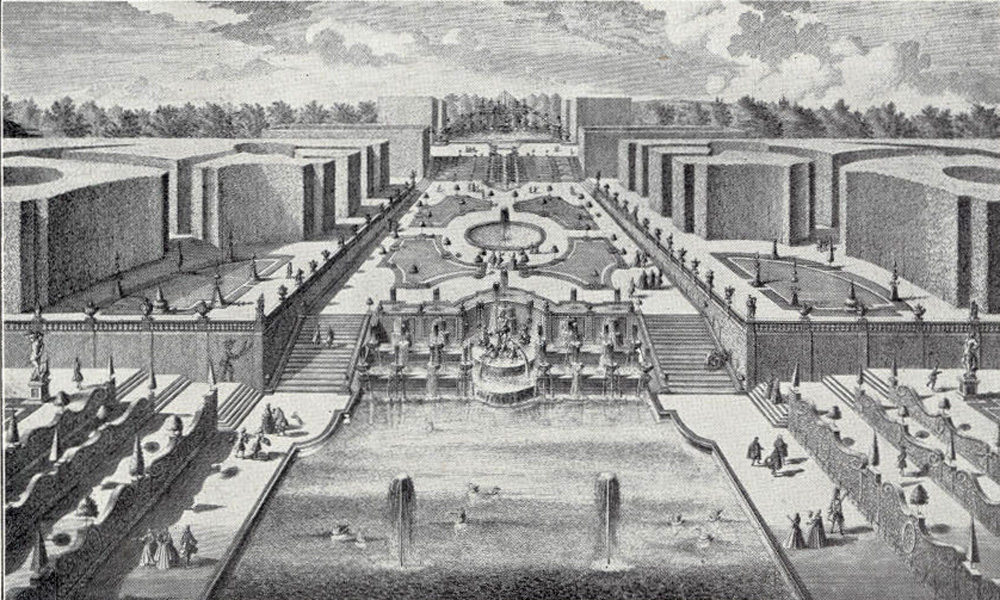
The middle parterre by Salomon Kleiner (1726)

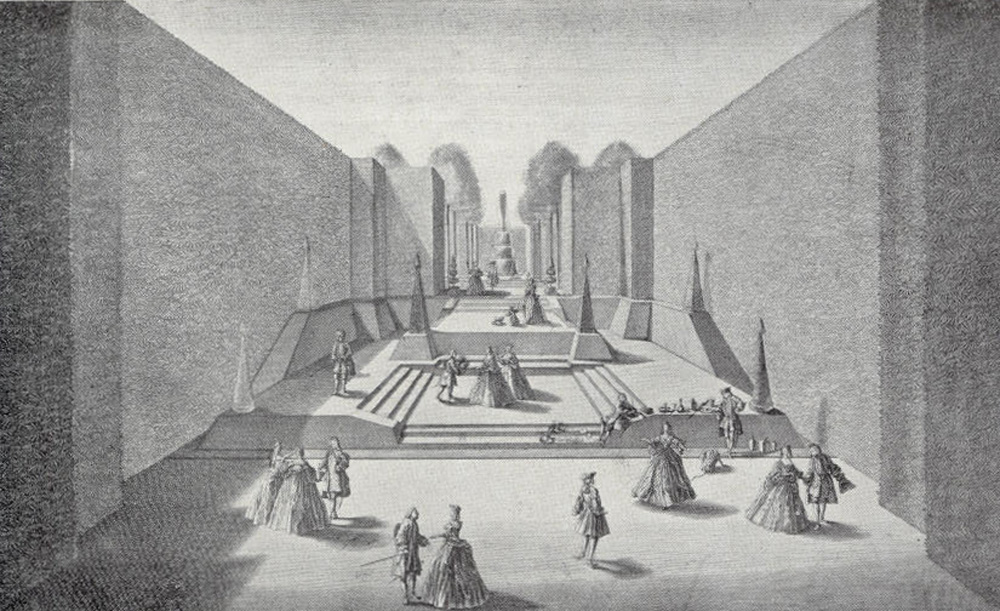
The Boulingrin by Salomon Kleiner (1726)

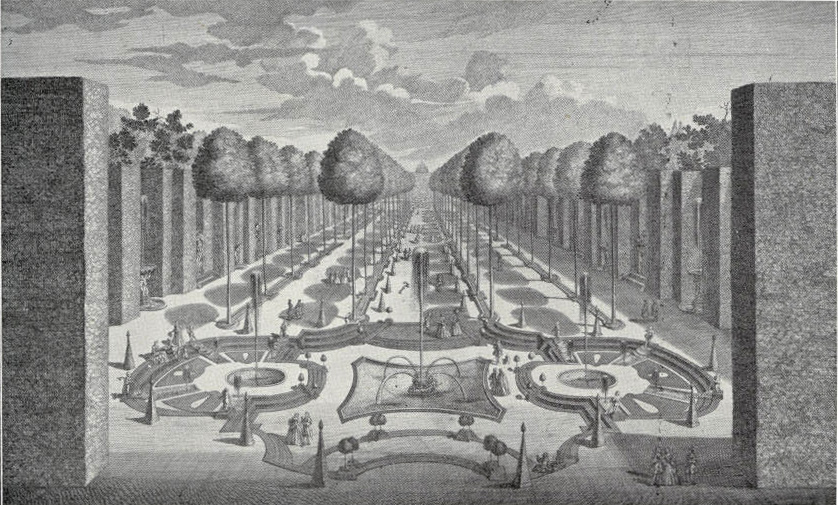
The Great Promenade by Salomon Kleiner (1726)

In the gardens of the Favorite palace, many of the garden architectural design elements used at that time were found. The predecessor garden had already been designed at the end of the 17th century in the prevailing formal style of a French formal garden. Thus, the broderie parterre in front of the Rhine mansion, divided by a sunken water basin, probably originates from the predecessor garden of the Favorite. The parterre de broderie, using boxwood as a design plant and variously colored gravel and stone materials, imitated embroidery (French: broderie). Its longitudinal alignment towards the building still reflected the sightline planning of the predecessor garden. Walkways between the cavalier pavilions and at the orangery rounded off the plant design in the upper building area.

In the central part of the complex, there were artfully shaped hedge walls that divided the park elements. Again separated by a water basin on the Rhine side, two Boulingrins were arranged in the lower parterre area. Moving upwards, away from the Rhine, two bosquets with cabinets (dense hedges or groves shaped by pruning, with open spaces in between) framed a lawn parterre with potted trees.

The third and northernmost garden area was closest to the city of Mainz. Smaller fountains and numerous carpet beds softened the overall third garden section. Horse chestnuts were mainly used as design elements there, a novel plant discovery at that time, referred to as "Maronirn," which was frequently and fondly used. Large bosquets of horse chestnut trees and hornbeam hedges surrounded a sunken Boulingrin with a water basin, a so-called Salle de verdure. The main entrance to the complex was also located there. Well-maintained grassy paths, referred to by Kleiner as "Communications-Stiegen," led upwards to further bosquet rooms and then to one of the most striking park elements of the entire complex, the "Great Promenade." This consisted of a horse chestnut avenue, modeled after the Salle aux Marronniers created by Louis XIV in Versailles. It presented a long, parallel-to-the-Rhine walkway at the height of the Favorite. Elaborate figure decorations and fountain bowls, along with smaller hornbeam bosquets with intimate cabinets, completed the great promenade.

=== Water features and grottos ===
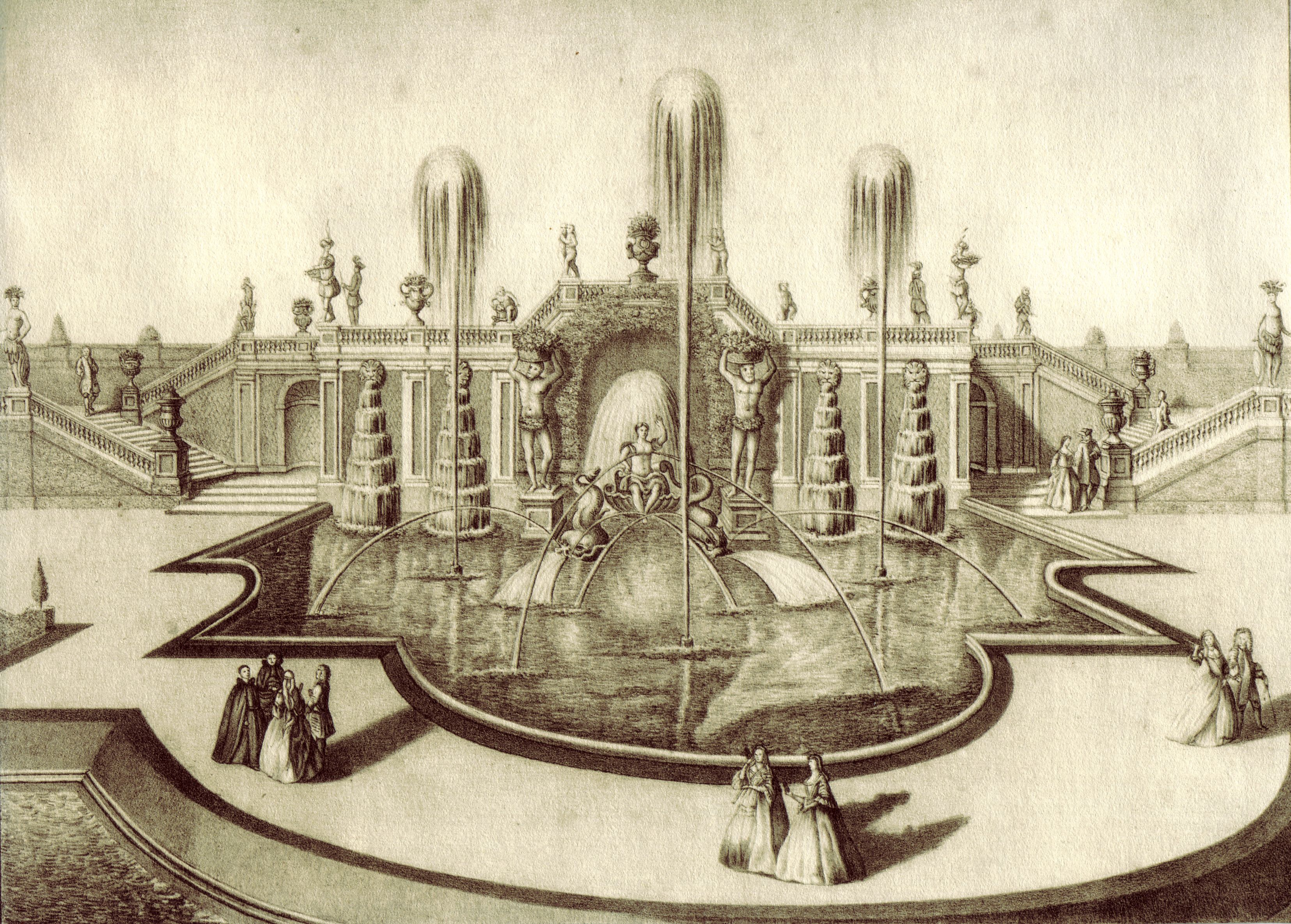
The Thetis fountain by Salomon Kleiner (1726)

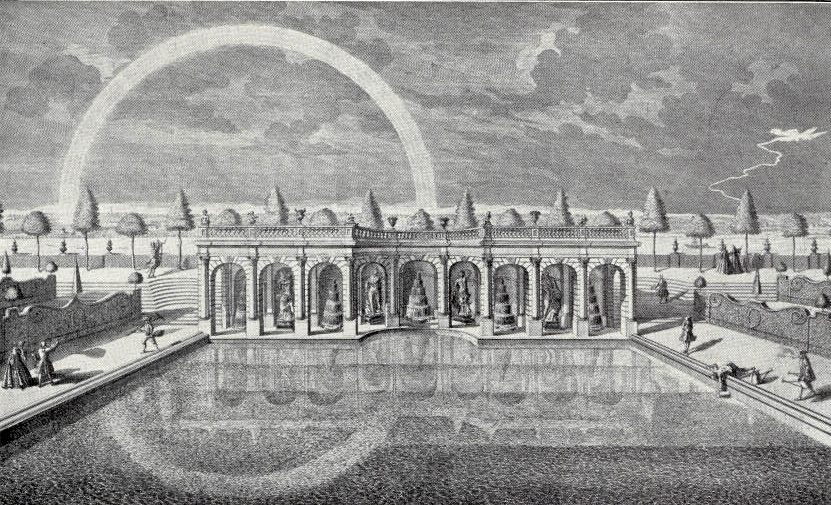
A Grotto at the Favorite Palace by Salomon Kleiner (1726)

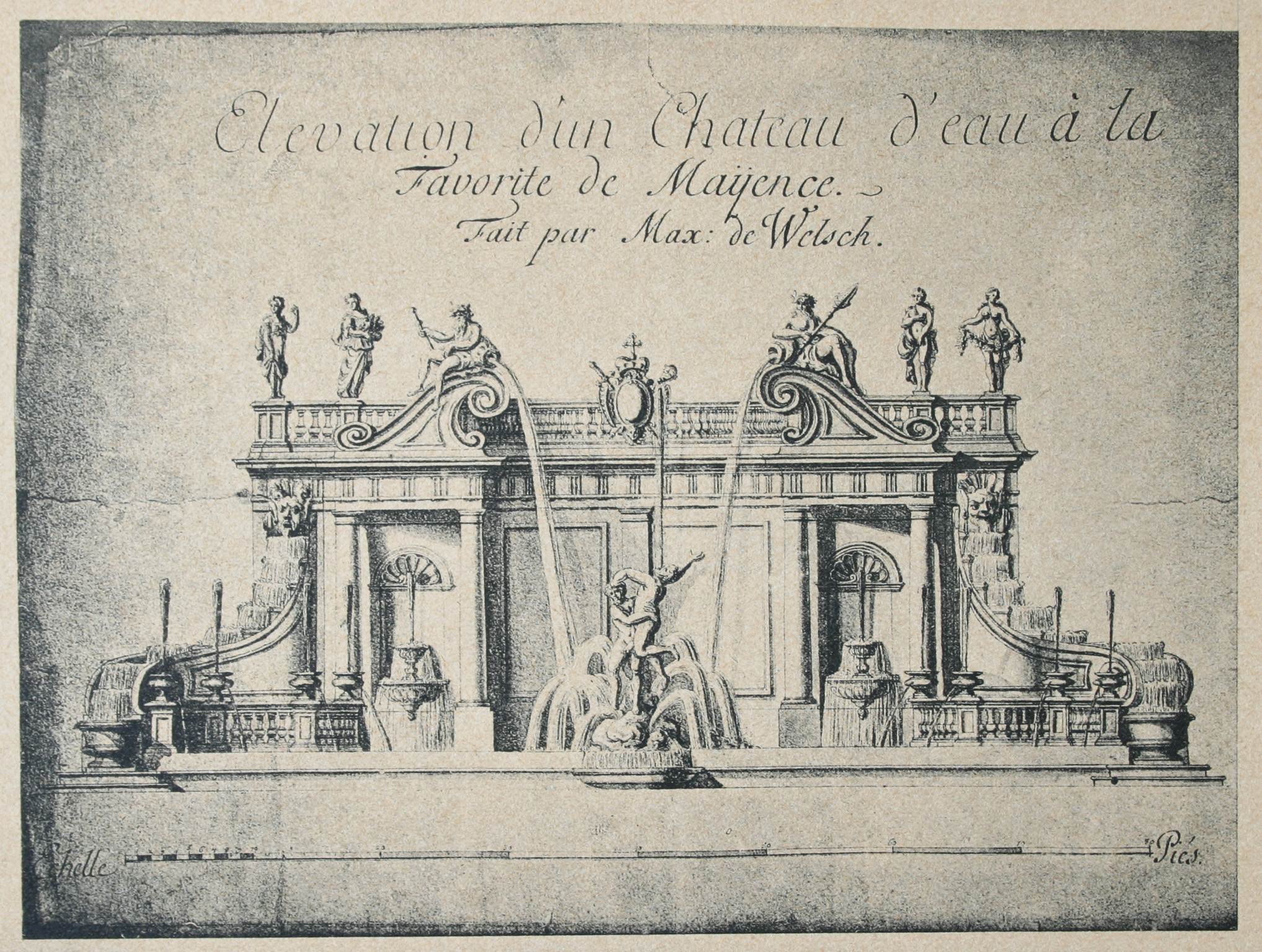
The Proserpina fountain at the Favorite Palace by Salomon Kleiner (1726)

In the three parallel-arranged garden areas, water features and basins as well as themed grottos were evenly distributed. Schönborn seemed to place great value on the water features, which were used in large numbers as a design element. For their operation, elaborate well drillings and installations were made at Hechtsheimer Berg.

In the southern garden area, located in the lower broderie parterre, there was a large sunken water basin with various water features and fountains. Adjacent to this, at the transition to the main parterre, was the so-called Thetis Grotto. Behind a basin with particularly high fountains, a semicircular grotto was built into a retaining wall, the main feature of which was a statue of Thetis seated on a shell, drawn by dolphins. Two atlantes flanked the group of figures.

In the main parterre of the first area, flanked by the six pavilions, there was again a three-tiered water basin adorned with rich figurative decorations, fountains, and cascading water features. According to Kleiner, this installation, referred to as the "great and water-rich cascade," allegorically represented "both rivers, the Rhine and Main." Behind this, separated by a narrow forecourt, rose the orangery as the concluding element of the design. In this initial section of the complex, the Rhine deliberately formed the transverse natural conclusion of the main visual axis created by the water elements.

In the middle garden area, considered the most magnificent of the entire Favorite, water features and grottos were arranged along the entire length as the central axis. At the end of the garden near the Rhine, the "perspective ascent of different cascades and fountains" began with a grotto facing away from the Rhine, adorned with diverse figurative decorations and waterfalls. The grotto was visible from the upper terraces as the conclusion of the visual axis formed by the water features. Following this was a large water basin fed by the "Neptune Cascade" located one terrace level above. This cascade corresponded with a "Ring Cascade" situated even higher up. In the central parterre of this area was another water basin with a fountain, and further up the steps, cascading waterfalls continued. The magnificent conclusion of the middle garden area was the semicircular fountain of Pluto and Proserpina, with the so-called Proserpina Grotto, often referred to as "chateau d'eau" (water castle). In an antique-style niche with pediments, the group of figures stood on an island-like pedestal in the water basin, flanked by water-carrying stairs on both sides.

In the northernmost and final garden area, water features were reduced in favor of plant-based design elements. At the lower end, a hedge enclosed a boulingrin by the Rhine. There was a sunken area planted with horse chestnuts and featuring a water basin as the central design element. Similarly, at the upper end, the grand promenade of cross-running horse chestnut avenues also incorporated water features.

=== Figurative decorations ===
Already in the Stadion Garden, there was an extensive program of figures and sculptures. The preserved, meticulously maintained inventory list upon the transfer of the garden to Schönborn lists the following items:

"14 stone urns, 34 small statues, of which one piece paid Frölicher in Frankfurt 16 Thaler each, 15 large statues, each counted at 100 fl., but costing more, with 4 of them where Frölicher had 120 Thaler per piece; Neptune with 3 sea horses; the 4 columns by Weyher and the portal of the grotto cost 700 Thaler without the stones..."

The mentioned "Frölicher" was the Swiss architect and sculptor Johann Wolfgang Fröhlicher, who, coming from Frankfurt (where he created, among other works, the high altar of St. Catherine's Church between 1680 and 1686), worked for Stadion starting in 1692. The figure group of Neptune's cascade with the central figure of the sea god Neptune surrounded by three sea horses, used in the Favorite, is attributed to him. The statue of a river god mentioned below is referred to in older literature sources as the river god "Rhenus" (Rhine) and is also attributed to Fröhlicher, who must have created it before 1700.

However, Franz Matthias Hiernle had a much greater role in the figurative decoration of the Favorite. Originally from Landshut in Bavaria, he had been in electoral service since 1705 and held the court office of court sculptor. He is credited with the statues of Bacchus, Faunus, Jupiter, Juno, Ceres, Flora, and all nymphs and geniuses from Greco-Roman mythology. One of Hiernle's particularly elaborate works was the group of figures for the themed fountain "Pluto's Abduction of Proserpina," which crowned the central garden area. As with all large water installations, Hiernle worked here according to Welsch's designs and implemented them artistically according to the technical specifications. Hiernle's sons, Sebastian and Kaspar Hiernle, probably also worked as sculptors on the figure decoration of the Favorite. Also associated with the Favorite as sculptors are the electoral sculptor Burkhard Zamels, Paul Curé, who was praised in his time as the "master of garden sculpture," and Paul Strudel. The latter two also served under Lothar Franz von Schönborn.

== Design: the buildings ==
=== Rhine Mansion (German: Das Rheinschlösschen) ===
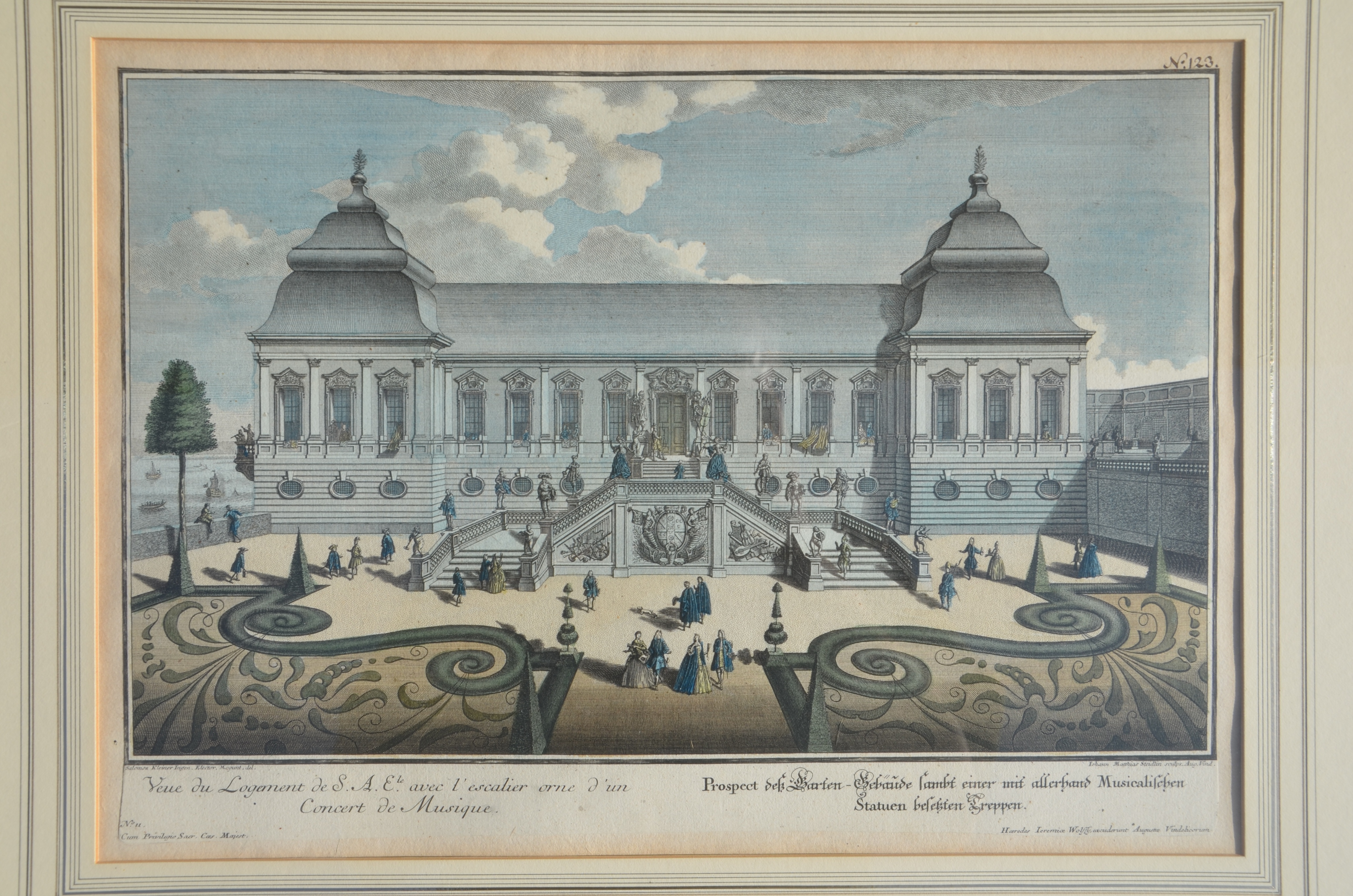
The Rhine Mansion at the Favorite Palace by Salomon Kleiner (1726)

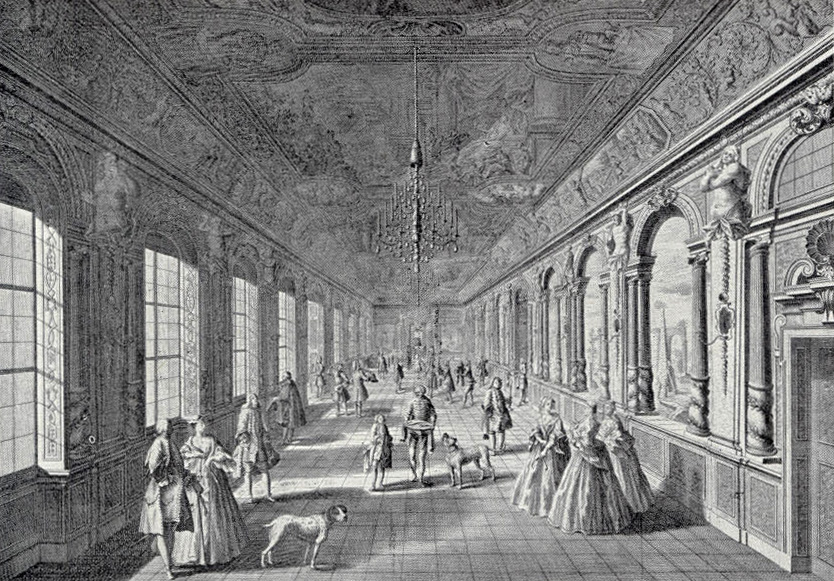
The Gallery at the Rhine Mansion at the Favorite Palace by Salomon Kleiner (1726)

It appears that the first building constructed at Favorite was an existing mansion, the "Rheinschlösschen", located directly on the banks of the Rhine in Stadion's pleasure garden. Schönborn continued to use this structure but had it extensively renovated, likely after 1705, with an additional floor added. The architect and builder responsible for this reconstruction was very likely Johann Leonhard Dientzenhofer, the court architect from Bamberg, whose services Schönborn also utilized as Prince-Bishop of Bamberg.

The building, with its rectangular layout, featured a Rhine front with a large entrance gate and a garden front with a grand staircase. The garden front, serving as the concluding part of the longitudinal axis of the first garden area, was richly decorated. Numerous, partly life-sized figures adorned the entrance and entrance portal. The stair front displayed the Schönborn coat of arms, flanked by musical emblems. Two dancing female figures, a recurring motif on other buildings within the complex, crowned the front pedestal. Protruding Avant-corps were located at the corners of both building fronts, with a smaller wing attached to the west side. According to the 1779 plan, this wing contained a simple chapel and evidently residential rooms.

The facade decoration in the form of painted false architecture in fresco technique, applied late (around 1721), utilized designs by the Italian Giovanni Francesco Marchini. Marchini, hailing from Como in Italy, was residing in Favorite at that time and later became a citizen of Mainz on 16 June 1727. The central and largest interior space of the building was a magnificent, richly stuccoed garden hall or gallery, also adorned with Marchini's painted false architecture in the early Baroque style. This may explain why Kleiner's engravings from 1726 already referred to the small palace as a "garden building." The wall surfaces of the garden hall were divided by painted columns. Only one side of the garden hall had windows; the opposite side was painted with false windows by the artists Marchini, Luca Antonio Colomba, and possibly Johann Rudolf Byss. All walls featured rich false embossing, meaning wall elements appeared to be highlighted in a three-dimensional manner through visual painting effects. The frescoed ceiling, already painted before, had a domed center supported by columns and was designed by Melchior Seidl. The central motif was the Temple of Artemis in Ephesus, one of the Seven Wonders of the World. Representations of the other wonders of the world were depicted to the right and left. Another popular motif at the time for garden buildings, as depicted in Kleiner's engravings, appears to have been Diana's toilet. Heavy chandeliers adorned the gallery ceiling for illumination.

=== The Orangery ===
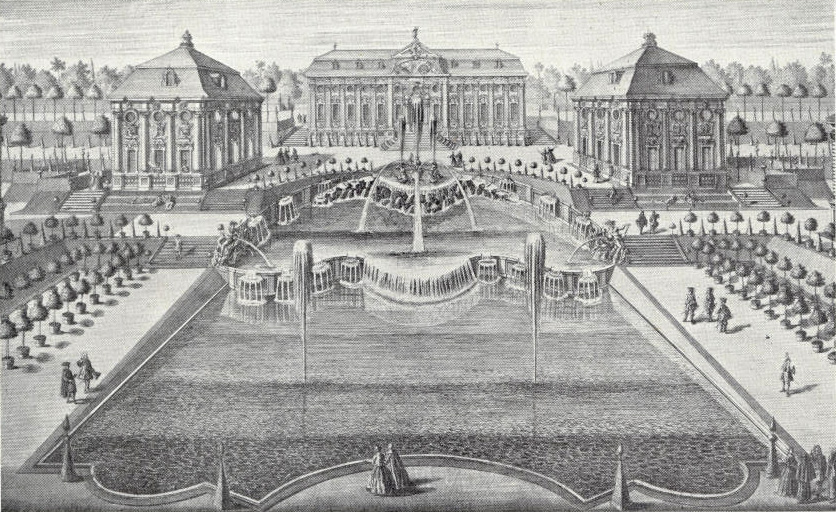
The Orangery at the Favorite Palace by Salomon Kleiner (1726)

The Orangery, built from 1717 onwards by Maximilian von Welsch, served as the central building of the Favorite estate. Originally planned as a small yet lavish pleasure palace, it was never realized in that form and was instead transformed into an orangery with a grand hall. This adaptation reflected the typical use of such structures during the Baroque era, where they housed exotic potted plants, particularly citrus trees, to provide the grand hall with an exotic and prestigious atmosphere.

The forecourt of the Orangery, known as the Orangery Parterre, was situated in front of the upper water cascade, serving as an area to display potted plants outdoors during the summer months. When the estate was taken over by Schönborn in 1700, an inventory list included various plants intended for the Orangery, such as orange trees, pomegranate trees, bay laurel trees, mastic shrubs, Yucca plants, and passionflowers.

The Orangery itself was a two-story building with a basement, high ground floor, mezzanine, and mansard roof with round windows. Its facade was richly adorned with painted faux architecture. Despite being a focal point in one of the most elaborate sightlines of the entire estate, the building's architectural style did not markedly differ from the surrounding six-tiered pavilions. The reasons for this comparatively modest design of the central building are not clear. During construction phases, Schönborn was regularly informed about all details, as evidenced in a letter from Dompropst Johann Philipp Franz to Schönborn dated 27 August 1718, expressing concerns about the size of the main door of the new Orangery.

Located at the western end of the upper main parterre, the Orangery overlooked the two-tiered large water feature, with its upper part described as the "Prospect of the large and water-rich Cascade, representing both rivers, the Rhine and the Main." Below the Orangery lay the Thetis Grotto, an integral part of the Favorite estate's artistic composition.

=== The Cavalier Houses (the Pavilions) ===
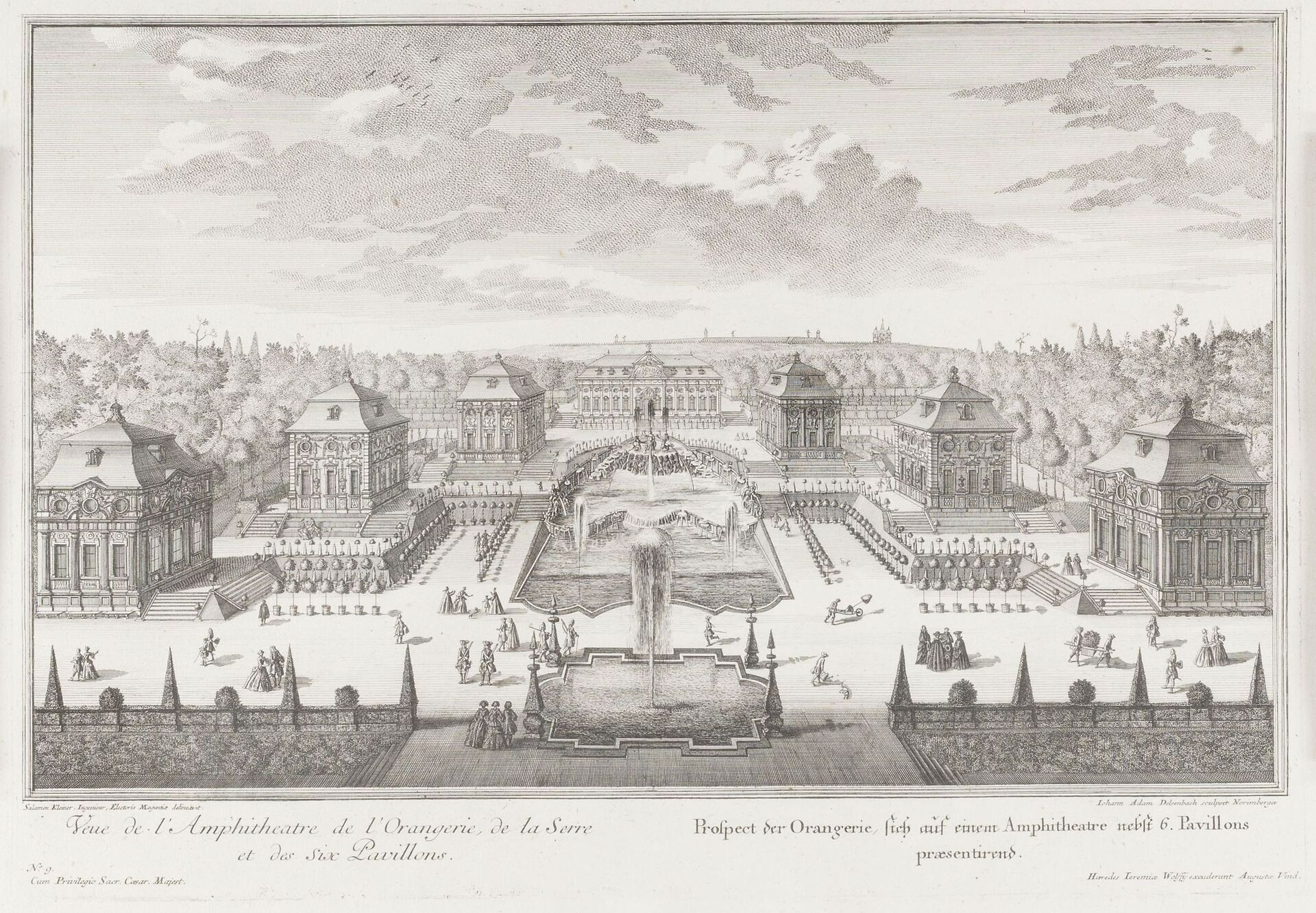
The Orangery and the Cavalier Houses at the Favorite Palace by Salomon Kleiner (1726)

In 1717/1718, Welsch constructed six semi-circular and terraced pavilions on the upper main parterre, known as the Cavalier Houses. For this architectural feature, the architect strictly adhered to the Lothar Franz's favorite model, Marly-le-Roi. Apparently, the Prince-elector placed more emphasis on the artistic ensemble of the park rather than the luxury of the buildings themselves. Upon completion, one of the Cavalier Houses was promptly converted into a bedroom for the Prince-elector, who reported this change to his nephew, Vice-Chancellor (German: Reichsvizekanzler) Friedrich Karl von Schönborn (1674–1746) in Vienna. The buildings were otherwise used to accommodate guests. The six pavilions were constructed in wood rather than stone and each housed four rooms. Similar to Marly, the Orangery, and the Rhine mansion of Favorite, the facades of these pavilions were adorned with painted faux architecture.

=== The Porcelain House ===
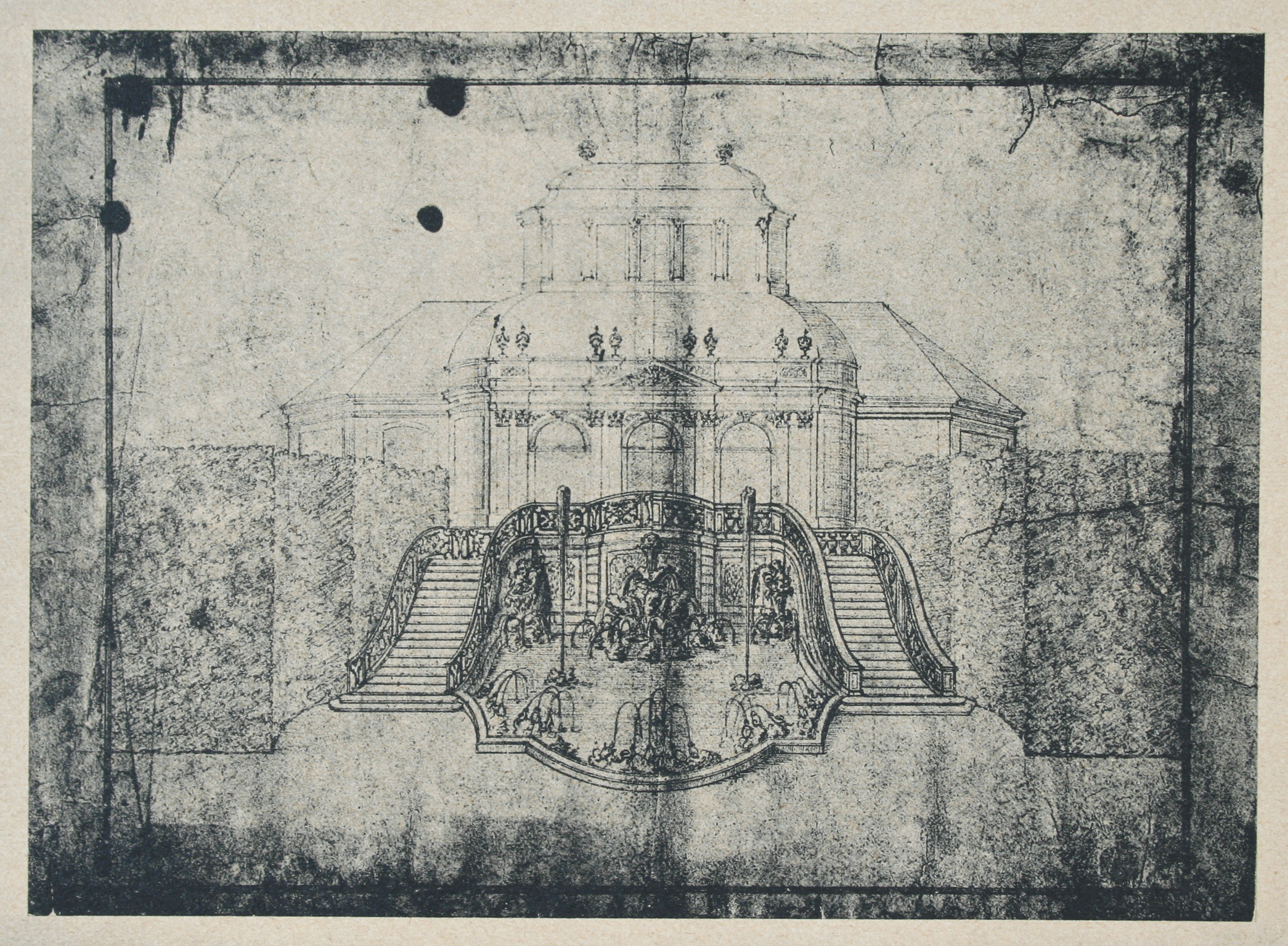
The Porcelain House

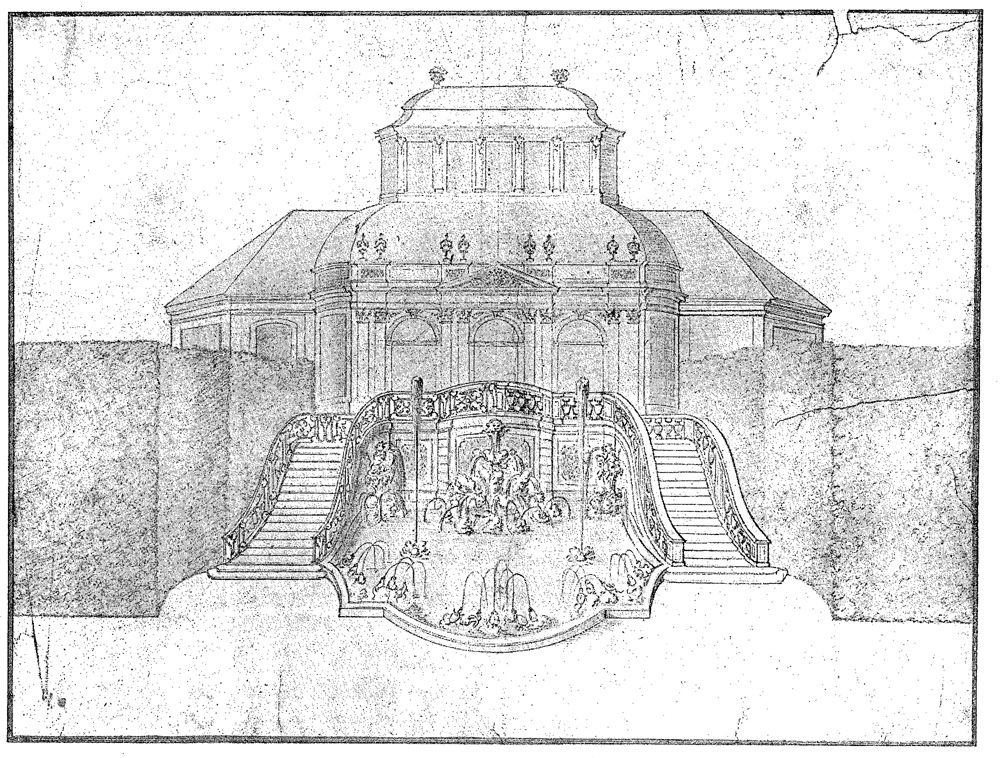
The Porcelain House

The so-called Porcelain House was the last major new construction at Favorite, and simultaneously the first of several renovation projects that followed in the subsequent decades. Construction likely began during the time of Schönborn, whose coat of arms adorned the water basin in front of the building. The completion of the Porcelain House occurred during the short reign of the succeeding Prince-elector Franz Ludwig von Pfalz-Neuburg.

Anselm Franz Freiherr von Ritter zu Groenesteyn was responsible for the planning and execution of the building. He succeeded Welsch as the leading architect and was appointed Electoral Chief Building Director in 1730. Groenesteyn, trained at the Parisian architectural school, introduced a French-influenced classical style to Mainz's High Baroque era, replacing the earlier Italian-Austrian and Main-Franconian-Middle-Rhenish Baroque styles prevalent during Welsch's time. One of the first buildings in this new style was the Porcelain House.

The design of the Porcelain House was once again inspired by the Marly model, specifically the Trianon de Porcelaine de Marly. It was located in the third and northernmost garden section, transitioning from the lower area near the Rhine to the upper avenue parterre. The rectangular building featured a convex-shaped roof zone on its front sides, with extensions attached on an oval floor plan and a hipped roof. A lantern with a half-convex, half-concave Mansard roof crowned the center of the roof surface. Facing the Rhine and the grand chestnut tree avenue were three French doors each, separated by pilasters arranged in pairs. The central door was emphasized by a tympanum. A double-flight staircase with wrought-iron grating or column balustrades (surviving plans show both variants) led towards the Rhine, surrounding an oval, figuratively adorned water basin with water features. Putti and vases adorned the cornice above the French doors and the lantern.

Inside, a rectangular hall dominated along the longitudinal axis with a central water basin. The interior of the building may have been adorned with decorative porcelain paneling and porcelain figures, although specific details about the interior decoration have not been preserved.

=== The ancillary buildings ===
The economic buildings at Favorite were naturally more utilitarian and did not form part of the prestigious sections of the estate. The inventory list of Stadion's Garden mentions stables and barns for eight horses and twenty head of cattle. The buildings for the service staff were also located in the upper garden area. Kleiner's plan from 1726 does not depict any economic buildings such as stables, tool sheds, greenhouses, nurseries, servant residences, etc., likely for artistic reasons. However, in a print by Le Rouge from 1779, these buildings are listed. They were situated behind the Orangery and occupied a relatively large space.

=== The Favorite and politics: der Fürstentag in July 1792 ===
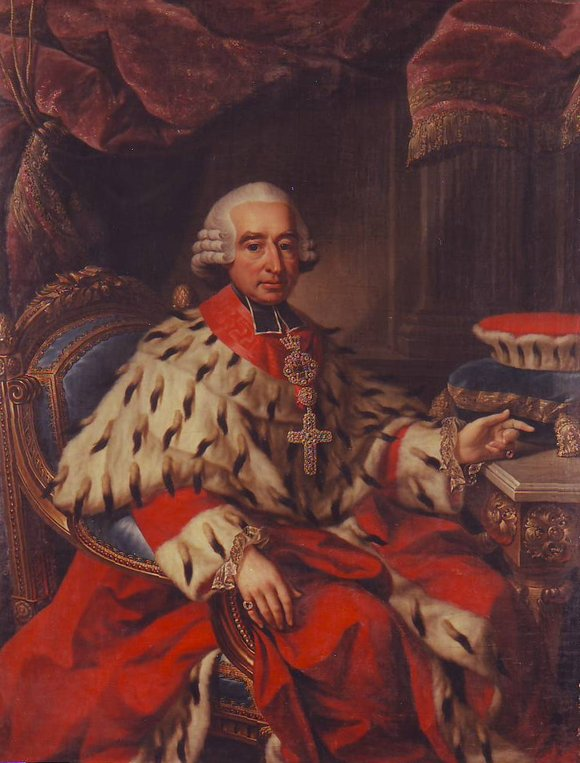
Friedrich Karl Joseph von Erthal, Prince-elector of Mainz

On 14 July 1792, the coronation of Franz Joseph Karl von Habsburg, Archduke of Austria as Francis II, took place in Frankfurt am Main. The new Emperor of the Holy Roman Empire of the German Nation shortly thereafter traveled to Mainz following his coronation. It was there, at the Favorite palace, from 19 to 21 July 1792, that a magnificent Fürstentag (princely assembly) was held, attended by political leaders such as Francis II and King Frederick William II of Prussia, alongside numerous other German princes and diplomats. The host was the Prince-elector of Mainz, Friedrich Karl Joseph von Erthal.

Politically, this Fürstentag was significant as it focused on coordinating the actions of the attending princes against revolutionary France, marking a pivotal moment in contemporary history. Charles William Ferdinand, Duke of Brunswick, also present, had prepared a counter-revolutionary manifesto for the occasion, which was printed at the electoral print shop in Mainz. This Brunswick Manifesto called for the restoration of the old (monarchical) order in France and threatened direct military action if not achieved. As events unfolded, the Fürstentag at the Favorite in Mainz indeed directly led to the First Coalition War and ultimately to the downfall of the Electorate of Mainz.

The three-day Fürstentag was the final and most splendid event held at the Favorite palace. Even before this, the Elector had hosted festivities and court balls for immigrants of the French nobility, including the Count of Artois (later Charles X of France) and Louis Joseph, Prince of Condé. However, for the Fürstentag, the host spared no expense to match the high-ranking guests. The Favorite and ships cruising the Rhine were illuminated, and fireworks lit up the sky. While Francis II lodged at the Electoral Palace, Friedrich Wilhelm II and his entourage stayed in the buildings of the Favorite. The guests were treated to a festive outdoor banquet. There are various eyewitness accounts of the Fürstentag of 1792, including those from Georg Forster, a naturalist and electoral chief librarian at the University of Mainz. More detailed descriptions, however, are found in two accounts: the relevant passage from the memoirs of Christoph Sachse, librarian from Weimar, in 1822, and a letter from an anonymous eyewitness of the festivities.

Anonymous Report on the Fürstentag, Letter of 8 August 1792:

Dear Mr. Chief Cellar Master! I will shortly recount to you the story of our festivities: They began praeter propter like the Corpus Christi procession, with a great gathering of fools, wise men, women, girls, and a large portion of those who have something in common with both, accompanied by the military, the entire citizenry, and school youth in white shepherd attire. In this formation, 300 cannons and the many-tongued bells of the entire clergy eagerly awaited the most blessed arrival of Their Imperial Majesties, to loudly express their most obedient devotion...

On the second [day], we had nothing to see except the court ball, where the Empress danced a great deal. According to the schedule, the illumination at the Favorite was supposed to be on this day; however, the bad weather of the previous day caused so much mischief that it could not be fully restored in one day. In this and in the expensive accommodations lies the cause of dissatisfaction for many foreigners: but who can control the weather and a tight budget?

Finally, on the third day, the eagerly awaited illumination took place; however, the entire plan did not succeed entirely as desired, due to a too strong west wind. Namely, in addition to the Favorite, which was protected by its location and truly looked heavenly, they also wanted to illuminate the church towers of Hochheim along with the deanery, those of Kostheim and Kastel along with the Rhine bridge; but despite all efforts, it was not possible to achieve this, so the whole suffered a great blow. To compensate, the spectators were treated to nine yachts, slowly descending from Weisenau, all illuminated with countless lights in half-pint glasses, which the wind could do nothing against; on the yachts, there was Turkish music and small cannons, which alternated incessantly with other artillery placed on the Mainz tip. Through the spaces between the yachts, 20 illuminated barges had to constantly cross back and forth, which added much life to the whole affair.

Georg Forster in: "Presentation of the Revolution" in Mainz, 1793 in Paris

After the coronation of Emperor Francis II, our Mainz became the gathering place for everything that is either important in Germany or considers itself important: crowned heads, princes, ministers, ambassadors, and a numerous nobility. We counted around ten thousand foreigners within our walls. All inns were occupied by princes who could no longer find space in the electoral palaces, and all private houses hosted guests or friends from some distant corner of Germany... From early morning, the streets were bustling with well-dressed individuals, and by noon, the clamor of carriages was loud enough to rival a capital city...

At court, festivities, banquets, concerts, balls, illuminations, fireworks, glorified by the incomparable magic of our surroundings and the majestic splendor of the Rhine, followed one after another for several days without interruption... Above all, the illuminations received the applause of connoisseurs. The gardens of the Favorite, the floating bridge, the yachts on the river, and the church towers of Kostheim, Kastel, and Hochheim in the distance conjured an artificial day in the darkness of the night, presenting a sight more beautiful than anything ever seen in London or Paris. In the vast mirror of the Rhine, the burning towers and the fireworks rising from the shore doubled themselves

== Destruction ==
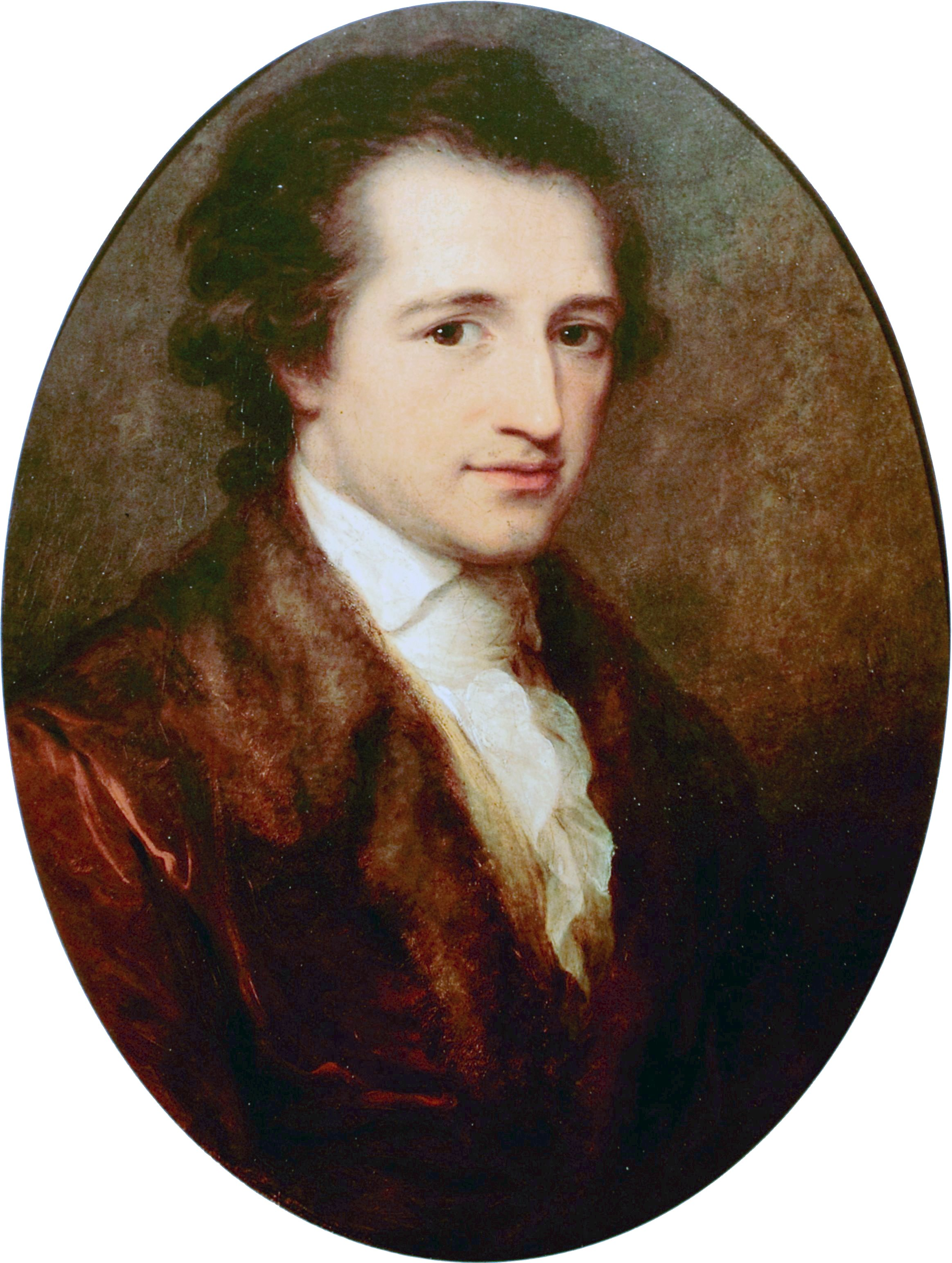
Johann Wolfgang von Goethe

Almost exactly one year after the Fürstentag in July 1792, the Favorite palace– including the Orangery and pavilions, the ornate flowerbeds with their richly adorned figures, the water features, the garden house, and the horse chestnut avenues – were completely destroyed. Ironically, this Fürstentag was the cause of the destruction of the Favorite. The coordinated strategy among the coalition forces discussed in Mainz between Emperor Francis II and King Frederick William II, to which the last Elector of Mainz, Friedrich Karl Joseph von Erthal, also belonged, led to the First Coalition War. Following the advance of Prussian and Austrian troops under the leadership of the Duke of Brunswick, the Battle of Valmy took place on 20 September 1792, resulting in a defeat for the coalition forces. The French revolutionary army counterattacked, entered the Palatinate under General Custine at the end of September, and occupied Mainz on 21 October 1792.

In mid-April 1793, during the counterattack by the Prussian and Austrian coalition forces, the now-French city and Fortress of Mainz were besieged. Due to the wartime leveling of the fortification's outer area, the first destructions of the Favorite occurred; among other things, the wooden cavalier pavilions were demolished, and trees were felled. After failed surrender negotiations, the bombardment of the besieged city began on the night of 17 June 1793, an event captured in literary form by eyewitness Johann Wolfgang von Goethe in his work "The Siege of Mainz." During the nearly four-week bombardment, the entire complex, situated directly on the front lines, was completely destroyed. However, not only the Favorite, but also Mainz's Church of Our Lady, the Jesuit Church, the Deanery, and many bourgeois and noble palaces were lost forever. Already on 25 June 1793, the Elector of Mainz, Friedrich Karl Joseph von Erthal, wrote in a letter:

The Favorite is destroyed forever, my furniture in the houses, vehicles, carriages, much linen, everything is ruined. My library has been moved, stolen, plundered.

After the capture of Mainz on 23 July 1793, Goethe visited the destroyed Favorite and wrote about his impressions:

As we wandered back and forth, we could hardly recognize the place where the Favorite had stood. In August of last year, there was still a magnificent garden hall here; terraces, an orangery, fountains made this pleasure resort right on the Rhine very delightful. Here, the avenues were green, where, as the gardener told me, His Gracious Elector entertained the highest heads with all their retinues at immense tables; and the good old man can tell you all about the dismantled tableware, silverware, and dishes. Attached to those memories, the present moment made only an unbearable impression.

== After the Favorite: "Wüstenei", "Richtplatz" and the "Neue Anlage" ==
The grounds of the Favorite palace remained devastated for the next 26 years. After the Treaty of Campo Formio in 1797, Mainz once again belonged to France. Building materials that could be salvaged from the devastated Favorite were used for the fortress construction in Kastel, undertaken by the French. In 1797, a local historian described the area as a "desert," presenting "an image of terrible devastation." In 1798, the French administration celebrated a "Festival of Agriculture" on the site of the destroyed Favorite, a location chosen with political and ideological motivations. This festival was part of various "National Festivals" celebrated in post-revolutionary French Mayence. Additionally, the grounds were used by French justice as an execution site. The most prominent criminal executed there in 1803 was Johannes Bückler, known as Schinderhannes, along with his gang members, who were guillotined on the grounds of the former Favorite.

Only after the end of French rule in 1814 and Mainz's annexation to the Grand Duchy of Hesse-Darmstadt on 30 June 1816, did the grounds of the former Electoral Favorite receive renewed attention. In 1816, it was handed over to the city of Mainz with the condition to establish an Urban Park there. Mainz landscape architect Peter Wolf, trained in Versailles, designed a so-called "Neue Anlage" (New Layout) in the style of an English landscape park for the grounds. This was constructed between 1820 and 1825. However, by the mid-19th century, the area had become overgrown. Therefore, the Siesmayer brothers, well-known garden architects from Frankfurt, were commissioned in 1888 to redesign it. The present-day city park largely bears their design imprint.

== Visible remains today ==
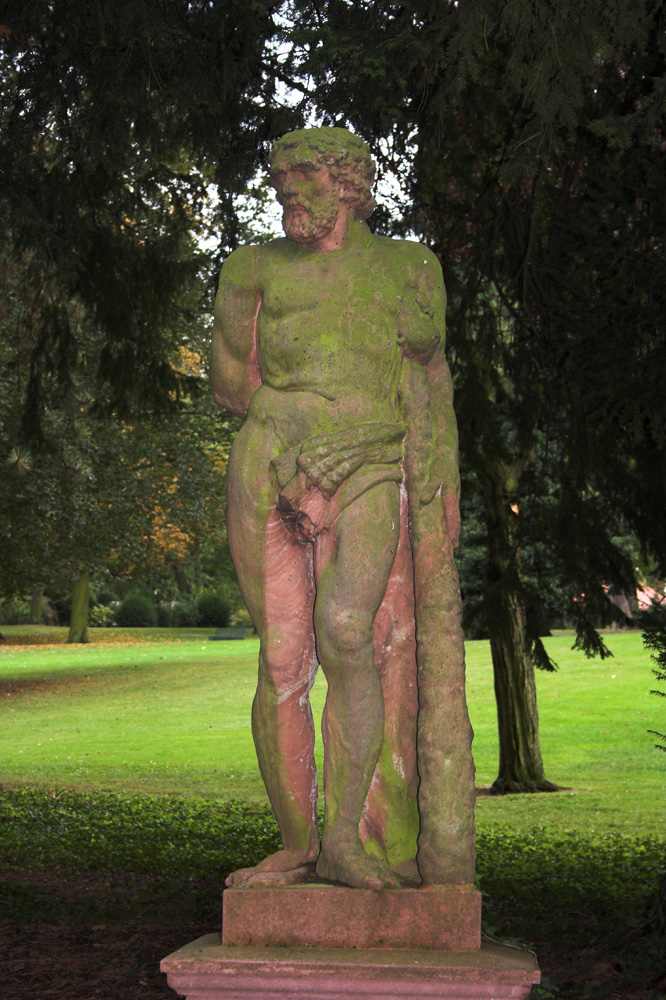
The statue of Hercules found in 1861

Of the entire complex of the Favorite palace, only two statues remain. The well-preserved red sandstone statue of Hercules was found during construction work for the Hessische Ludwigsbahn in 1861 and was placed by the Siesmayer brothers in the later city park. There, under similar circumstances, was also found the torso of a river god (Rhenus?), which may have been a figurative part of the large water cascade in front of the Orangery.

During excavations at the Winterhafen in late 2009, remnants of the enclosure and retaining wall of the Rheinschlösschen, as well as the gravel-paved promenade path that ran along the Rhine, were discovered.

Linguistic echoes of the former palace are found in the street name 'An der Favorite' and a hotel of the same name in the city park. At the city-side northern entrance of the city park, a large informational sign from the city of Mainz highlights the former complex.

== Pleasure palace or baroque garden ==
In literature, the term Favorite palace is typically used to refer to the entire complex. Lustschlösser emerged from medieval courtly life and served Baroque and Rococo princes as intimate and luxurious retreats away from the elaborate court ceremonials. A significant feature of Lustschlösser was the extensive garden park surrounding the castle.

When comparing the emphasis on buildings versus park facilities at the Favorite, one notices the relatively modest size and execution of the buildings, contrasting with the magnificent garden design. The small Rheinschlösschen existed primarily before the construction of Favorite began; the central building planned as the actual Lustschlösschen was converted into an orangery, which likely did not fully align with the original architectural intent. The building decorations using pseudo-architecture and fresco painting also diverge from Schönborn's architectural principles. Visitors to Favorite, such as the English traveler Blainville in 1705, frequently noted this discrepancy, describing the buildings as rather "mediocre," while praising the gardens highly. Therefore, one might consider referring to Favorite more accurately as a Baroque garden with subordinate and less significant buildings.

However, two facts support maintaining the classification of the complex as a Lustschloss focusing on its surrounding gardens:

Lothar Franz von Schönborn, during his tenure as Elector, had the Electoral palace as his main residence for court ceremonials and state affairs. This Renaissance-style building had been under construction since 1627 and was not fully completed during Schönborn's time. Although Schönborn considered the Electoral palace too outdated for his taste in art, he likely still used it. Therefore, the Lustschloss Favorite outside the city served as the classical role of an intimate retreat and summer residence, with a clear emphasis on gardens and water features.

According to Hennebo and Hoffmann, the placement of the main building in High Baroque gardens in Germany was highly diverse. They discuss the subordination of the main building within the overall plan and the delegation of certain functions to orangery, festival, or garden buildings—similar features found at Favorite. For instance, in the Ansbach Residence, an orangery (though more palace-like in construction) served as the central building. The substitution of elaborate building masses with delicate hedge bosquets due to confined space is also mentioned, seen not only in Mainz but also in places like the Herrenhausen Gardens and the Belvedere Gardens in Vienna.

== Classification of the Favorite in contemporary garden architecture ==
The Favorite palace, alongside its model Marly-le-Roi, is regarded as the first and pioneering example of the transition from the formal, French-influenced Baroque garden to more relaxed design structures with parallel individual garden layouts. This development reached its culmination and further evolution in Sanssouci under Frederick the Great. Therefore, the Favorite, which assimilated influences from France, Vienna, and Italy in the new garden design and infused them with German Baroque elements, became a model for later Baroque and Rococo gardens.

While the planning of the Lustschloss and its grounds initially followed the French model, the Favorite exhibited some distinct features that partly shaped future trends in garden architecture. The division of the entire estate into three parallel garden areas aligned towards the Rhine was almost revolutionary in contemporary garden design. Each area emphasized different design elements that harmonized with the overall layout. Hennebo and Hoffmann aptly describe this as "...an increasingly stronger tendency towards dissolving the compelling, uniform axial structure of the Baroque garden, towards breaking its concept of subordination and unity..."

The configuration of sightlines, partly parallel to the Rhine and partly pointing towards it, was also innovative for its time. Marie-Luise Gothein refers to this as a triple-axis development and identifies the Favorite as the most significant among Lothar Franz von Schönborn's numerous gardens.

Another remarkable aspect was the integration of the rivers Rhine and Main (and hence the surrounding natural environment) into the overall design concept. As mentioned earlier, Schönborn had a preference for elaborate water features. Therefore, his architects designed the first and second garden areas in such a way that the sightlines guided by cascading water features led towards the Rhine and the nearby mouth of the Main River. Thus, the Rhine served as a concluding natural water channel at the lower end of the parterres, while the Main represented an indirect continuation of the axis formed by the watercourses within the estate.

The successful staging of the Favorite palace, combined with its surrounding natural landscape—especially the presence of the two rivers and the typical vineyard terraces on the slopes—was highly praised by many prominent visitors, including poets like Goethe and Schiller. This period also shows the initial signs of the emerging Rhine romanticism at the end of the 18th and beginning of the 19th centuries, which can be traced in the earliest descriptions of the Favorite. As early as 1785, Hirschfeld wrote in his Theory of Garden Art:

"The splendid location of the Favorite near Mainz still maintains some fame for this formerly renowned garden. The Main River joins the Rhine almost under the windows of the palace, both flowing past in view of the garden, behind which graceful vineyards rise."

== Literature ==
- Hedwig Brüchert (Hrsg.): Vom kurfürstlichen Barockgarten zum Stadtpark. Die Mainzer Favorite im Wandel der Zeit. Förderverein Stadthistorisches Museum Mainz e. V., Mainz 2009. ISSN 1868-3177
- Rudolf Busch: Das Kurmainzer Lustschloss Favorite. Sonderdruck: Rheinisches Kulturinstitut, 1951. Aus: Mainzer Zeitschrift, 44/45, 1949/50.
- Eduard Coudenhove-Erthal: Die Kunst am Hofe des letzten Kurfürsten von Mainz: Friedrich Carl Joseph Freiherr v. Erthal, 1774–1802. In: Wiener Jahrbuch für Kunstgeschichte, Band 10. Rohrer, Baden bei Wien, 1935, S. 57–86.
- Paul-Georg Custodis (Bearb.): Das kurfürstliche Mainzer Lustschloss Favorite: Sonderausstellung Stadthistorisches Museum Mainz, 1. August bis 12. September 2004. Mainz, 2004
- Franz Dumont, Ferdinand Scherf, Friedrich Schütz (Hrsg.): Mainz – Die Geschichte der Stadt. von Zabern, Mainz 1999 (2. Aufl.). ISBN 3-8053-2000-0.
- Marie Luise Gothein: Geschichte der Gartenkunst, Zweiter Band Von der Renaissance in Frankreich bis zur Gegenwart. Verlag Eugen Diederichs, Jena 1926; Nachdruck Verlag Georg Olms Hildesheim 1988, ISBN 3-487-09091-0.
- Uta Hasekamp: Die Schlösser und Gärten des Lothar Franz von Schönborn: das Stichwerk nach Salomon Kleiner (Grüne Reihe, 24). Wernersche Verlagsanstalt, Worms 2005, ISBN 3-88462-192-0.
- Ulrich Hellmann: Der Hofgarten in Mainz und die Gärtner am kurfürstlichen Hof. Wernersche Verlagsgesellschaft, Mainz 2017, ISBN 978-3-88462-378-7.
- Dieter Hennebo, Alfred Hoffmann: Geschichte der deutschen Gartenkunst, Band II: Der architektonische Garten – Renaissance und Barock. Broschek Verlag, Hamburg 1965
- Karl Lohmeyer: Südwestdeutsche Gärten des Barock und der Romantik im ihren in- und ausländischen Vorbildern: Nach dem Arbeitsmaterial der saarländischen und pfälzischen Hofgärtnerfamilie der Koellner. Saarbrücker Abhandlungen zur südwestdeutschen Kunst und Kultur, Band 1. Saarbrücken: Buchgewerbehaus Aktiengesellschaft, 1937.
- Norbert Schindler: Die Favorite zu Mainz und die neue Anlage. In: Das Gartenamt. 9/1962, S. 240–245.
- Werner Wentzel: Die Gärten des Lothar Franz von Schönborn, 1655–1729. Gebr. Mann Verlag, Berlin 1970, ISBN 3-7861-4033-2.
- Heinrich Wohte (Hrsg.): Mainz – Ein Heimatbuch. Verlag Johann Falk III. Söhne, Mainz 1928
