= 1707 in architecture =

The year 1707 in architecture involved some significant events and new architectural works.

== Events ==
- Johann Dientzenhofer takes over building work on Banz Abbey, following the death of his brother Leonhard Dientzenhofer.

== Buildings and structures ==
=== Buildings ===
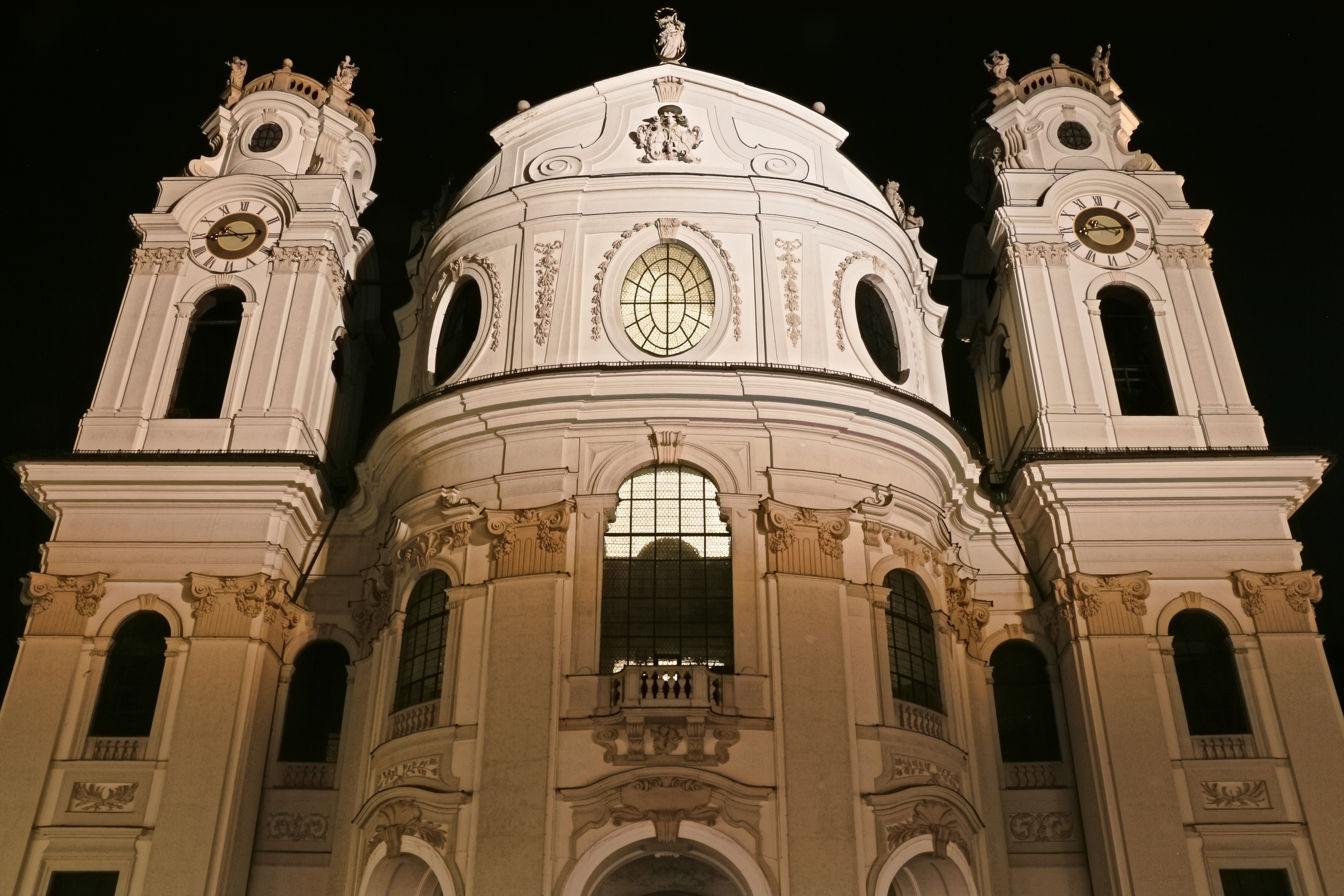
The Kollegienkirche, Salzburg, Austria

- In Istanbul, the Yeni Valide Mosque is begun (completed in 1710).
- The first Petrine Baroque building in Moscow, the Menshikov Tower (church), designed by Ivan Zarudny, is structurally complete.
- The Kollegienkirche, Salzburg, designed by Johann Bernhard Fischer von Erlach, is dedicated.
- In Paris, France, the Hôtel de Vendôme, designed for the Carthusians by Jean-Baptiste Alexandre Le Blond, is completed.
- In Beijing, construction of the Old Summer Palace (圆明园, Yuánmíngyuán, "Gardens of Perfect Brightness") begins.

== Births ==
- February 1 – Francesco Ottavio Magnocavalli, Italian architect (died 1789)
- unknown dates
  - Giuseppe Bonici, Maltese architect and military engineer (died 1779)
  - Johann George Schmidt, German baroque architect working in Dresden (died 1774)

== Deaths ==
- November 26 – Leonhard Dientzenhofer, German builder and architect (born 1660)
