= List of Baroque architecture =

The following is a list of examples of various types of Baroque architecture since its origins.

Building	Picture	Location	Date	Architect(s)
St Peter's Basilica		Vatican City	1506–1615	Michelangelo, Giacomo della Porta, Carlo Maderno
Urbanistic complex of the city of Valletta		Valletta, Malta	1566–1798	Francesco Laparelli, Gerolamo Cassar
Church of the Gesu		Rome, Italy	1568–1580	Giacomo Barozzi da Vignola, Giacomo della Porta
Santa Susanna		Rome, Italy	1585–1603	Carlo Maderno
Saints Peter and Paul Church		Kraków, Poland	1597–1619	Giovanni Maria Bernardoni, Giovanni Trevano
Wallenstein Palace		Prague, Czech Republic	1623–1630	Giovanni de Galliano Pieroni, Andrea Spezza, Niccolo Sebregondi
Château de Versailles		Versailles, France	1661–1774	Jules Hardouin Mansart, Louis Le Vau, André Le Nôtre (gardens) and many co-operators
Pažaislis monastery		Kaunas, Lithuania	1664–1696	Pietro Puttini, Carlo Puttini, Giovanni Battista
San Carlo alle Quattro Fontane		Rome, Italy	1665–1676	Francesco Borromini
San Lorenzo (Turin)		Turin, Italy	1666–1679	Guarino Guarini
St Paul's Cathedral		London, England	1675–1710	Christopher Wren
Wilanów Palace		Warsaw, Poland	1677–1729	Augustyn Wincenty Locci, Giovanni Spazzio
Les Invalides		Paris, France	1679–1708	Jules Hardouin Mansart
Troja Palace		Prague, Czech Republic	1679–1685	Jean Baptiste Mathey, Giovanni Domenico Orsi
Branicki Palace		Białystok, Poland	1691–1697	Tylman Gamerski
Stift Melk		Melk, Austria	1702–1736	Jakob Prandtauer
Schloss Bensberg		Bergisch Gladbach, Germany	1703–1711	Matteo Alberti
Saint Nicholas Church		Prague, Czech Republic	1703–1752	Christoph Dientzenhofer, Kilian Ignaz Dientzenhofer
Blenheim Palace		Woodstock, England	1705–1722	Sir John Vanbrugh
Zwinger Palace		Dresden, Germany	1709–1732	Matthäus Daniel Pöppelmann
Pommersfelden castle		Pommersfelden, Germany	1711–1719	Johann Dientzenhofer and Johann Lucas von Hildebrandt
Karlskirche		Vienna, Austria	1715–1737	Johann Fischer von Erlach
Mafra Palace		Mafra, Portugal	1717–1730	João Frederico Ludovice
Holy Trinity Column		Olomouc, Czech Republic	1716–1754	Wenzel Render
Pilgrimage Church of Saint John of Nepomuk		Žďár nad Sázavou, Czech Republic	1719–1722	Jan Santini Aichel
Palace of La Granja		Segovia, Spain	1720–1740	Teodoro Ardemans and Filippo Juvarra
Würzburg Residence		Würzburg, Germany	1720–1740	Balthasar Neumann
Karlova Koruna Chateau		Chlumec nad Cidlinou, Czech Republic	1721–1723	Jan Santini Aichel, František Maxmilián Kaňka
Peterhof Palace		St Petersburg, Russia	1721–1755	Bartolomeo Rastrelli
Frauenkirche		Dresden, Germany	1726–1738	George Bähr
Trevi Fountain		Rome, Italy	1732–1762	Nicola Salvi
The High Street screen of Queen's College		Oxford, England	1733–1736	Nicholas Hawksmoor
Church of St. John's		Vilnius, Lithuania	1738–1748	Johann Christoph Glaubitz
Mateus Palace		Vila Real, Portugal	1739–1743	Nicolau Nasoni
Royal Palace of Madrid		Madrid, Spain	1738–1755	Filippo Juvarra, Juan Bautista Sacchetti and Ventura Rodríguez.
St. Michael's Golden-Domed Monastery		Kyiv, Ukraine	ca. 1746	Ivan Hryhorovych-Barskyi and others
Queluz Palace		Sintra, Portugal	1747–1758	Mateus Vicente de Oliveira
Nuruosmaniye Mosque		Istanbul, Turkey	1748–1755	Simeon Kalfa and Mustafa Ağa

== See also ==
- List of Baroque residences
