= Susanna and the Elders (Artemisia Gentileschi, Pommersfelden) =

Painting by Artemisia Gentileschi

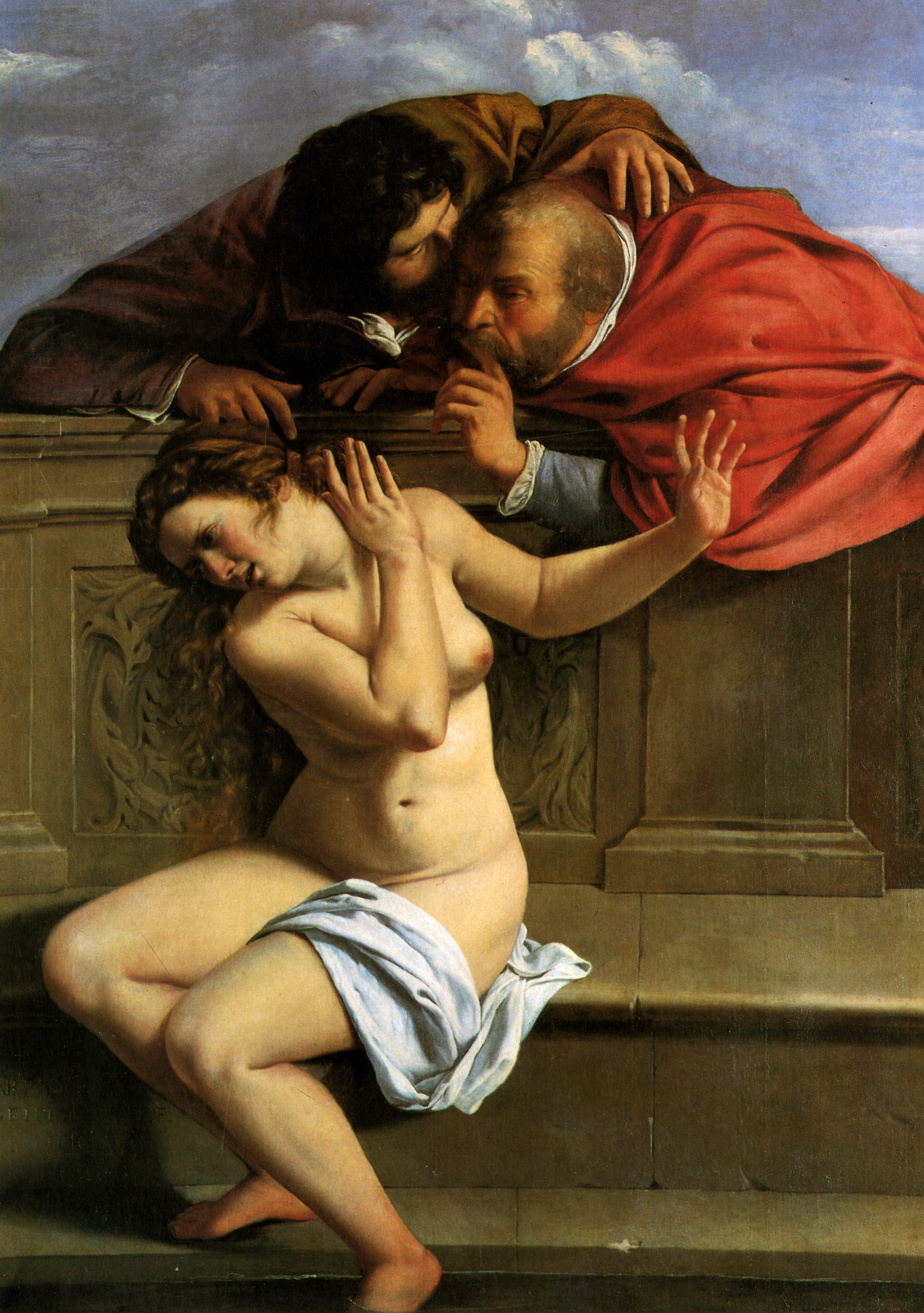
- Artist: Artemisia Gentileschi
- Year: circa 1610
- Medium: oil on canvas
- Dimensions: 170 cm × 119 cm (67 in × 47 in)
- Location: Schloss Weißenstein, Pommersfelden

Susanna and the Elders is a 1610 painting by the Italian Baroque artist Artemisia Gentileschi and is her earliest-known signed and dated work. Artemisia painted several variations of the scene in her career. This one hangs at Schloss Weißenstein in Pommersfelden, Germany, where it can be seen from a distance. The work shows a frightened Susanna accosted by two men (shown above her) while she is bathing. This was a popular scene to paint during the Baroque period. The subject comes from the deuterocanonical Book of Susanna in the Additions to Daniel.

== Description ==
=== Subject matter ===
The painting is a representation of a biblical narrative featured in chapter 13 of the Book of Daniel according to the text as maintained by the Catholic and Eastern Orthodox churches, although not generally by Protestants.

Two elders are shown disturbing a young married woman named Susanna. Susanna had gone out to the garden one day to bathe. The elders were hiding in the garden. They demanded sexual favors from her, which she refused. The men threatened to ruin her reputation, but Susanna held fast. The two elders then falsely accused Susanna of adultery – a crime that was punishable by death. When Daniel, a wise young Hebrew man, questioned them separately, details in the two elders' stories did not match. Their conflicting stories revealed the falsehood of their testimony, thus clearing Susanna's name.

The subject was relatively common in European art from the 16th century, with Susanna exemplifying the virtues of modesty and fidelity. In practice however, it allowed artists the opportunity to display their skill in the depiction of the female nude, often for the pleasure of their male patrons.

=== Interpretations of Gentileschi's work ===
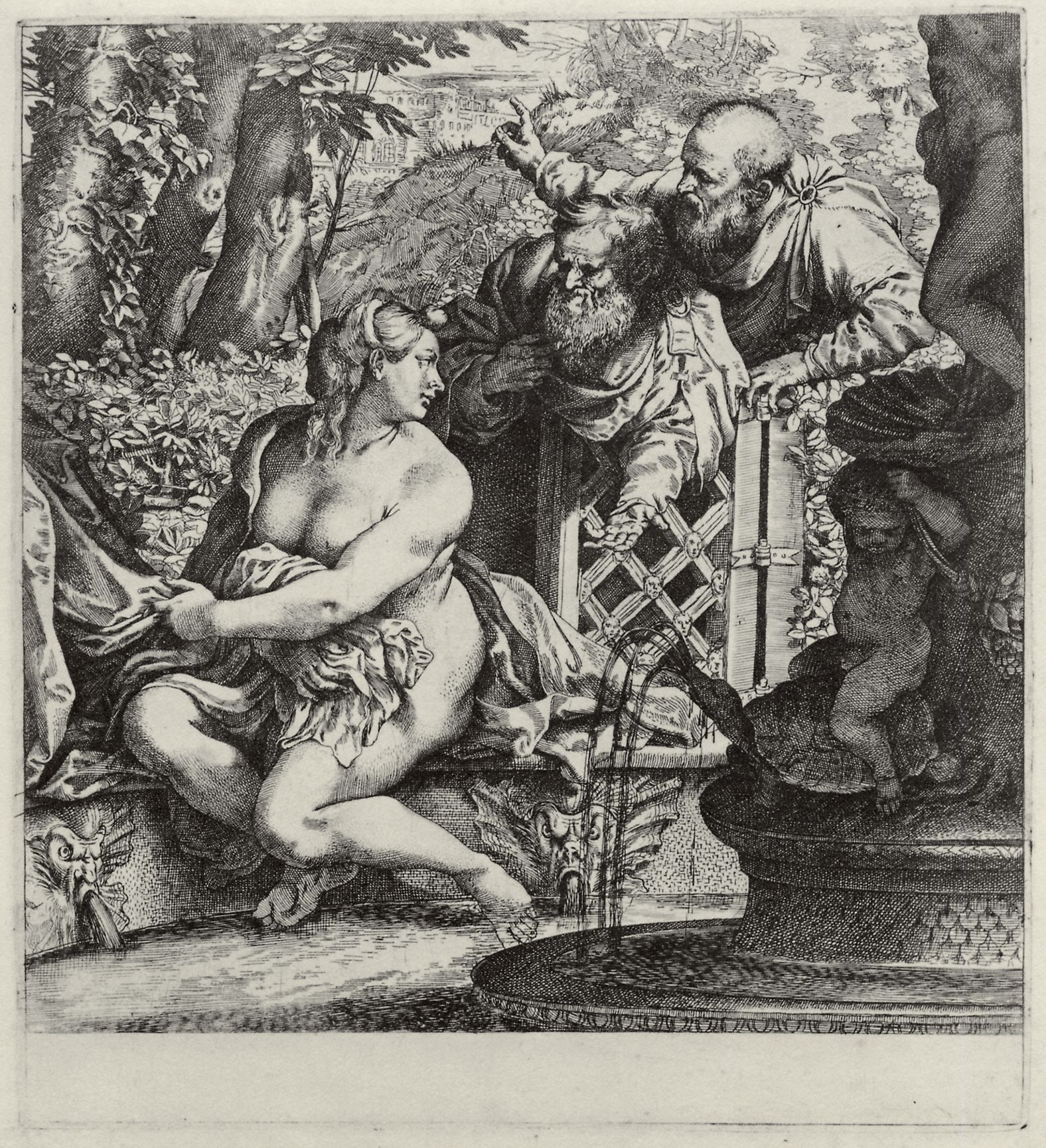
Annibale Carracci, Susanna and the Elders

Gentileschi's painting has been compared to that of other artists who used the same subject, but were male. Gentileschi's Susanna sits uncomfortably, a twist to her body showing her distress, unlike many depictions that fail to reveal any discomfort. A common comparison is made with Annibale Carracci’s version of Susanna and the Elders. Gentileschi's Susanna is both uncomfortable and more feminine than Carracci's Susanna, whose body appears more anatomically masculine yet is portrayed in a more eroticized position, as if receptive to the two elders' attention. Rather than depicting the typical body type of previous paintings of Susanna, Gentileschi chose a more classical style for Susanna's body, which elevates her nudity in a more heroic sense. The setting of this scene in a stone enclosure further represents a departure from the typical garden setting used in previous depictions by other artists. Gentileschi's vertical composition also spreads the two elders at the top as a dark element hovering over the scene, creating a feeling of malevolent pressure imposed on Susanna.

Gentileschi painted this scene at least twice more during her lifetime. As this version is the earliest, it has been presumed by Roberto Contini, Germaine Greer, Susanna Stolzenwald, and Mary D. Garrard that she painted with her father's guidance. Art historians Roberto Longhi and Andrea Emiliani questioned how Gentileschi could paint a convincing female nude at such a young age. They speculated whether she had studied female anatomy or used a model of her father's, as his work studio was in the family home. However, no other artist had explored the psychological dimension of this Biblical story before, suggesting that Gentileschi's father, a traditionally trained artist, would have had no hand in influencing the concept of the young artist's painting. Artemisia's naturalistic rendering of the female form stands in contrast to her father's style, however the adjustments revealed by x-rays may suggest that Orazio's guidance was focused on compositional arrangement rather than depiction.

=== Signature ===
Gentileschi's signature is shown on the stone step on the lower left of the image. She only signed 19 of her paintings in total. The spelling and format of signature varied because at that time, spelling was not standardized. Rather, the body of works are attributed to Gentileschi, partly because historians have been able to match her paintings‘ signatures on letters she wrote. However, Raymond Ward Bissell questioned if she was the one signing her paintings because of the spellings used in four of the letters in which "Gentileschi" is spelled with the letter "e" used in place of "i".

=== Gentileschi painting style ===
Gentileschi did not include landscape or background in many of her paintings. As shown in this painting, the only background is a blue sky. It was not until the mid-1630s that Gentileschi began using background or landscape, which may be seen in another of her paintings of the same story.

== History ==
=== Date ===
The questioning of the date of the painting started in 1845, in Joseph Heller's guidebook for the Pommersfelden collection. Art historian Rave said that the last digit looked like a 6 or a 9, so the date could be 1616 or 1619. On the other hand, art historians such as Rose-Marie Hagen said that it was a zero, and the date of 1610 was correct. The painting was x-rayed in 1970 by Susanna P. Sack, which confirmed that the date is written as 1610. That revelation was published by Mary D. Garrard in 1982 and most scholars have accepted it. The date of the painting is important because a date of 1616 or 1619 it would put the painting into the Florentine period. However, since the work was completed in 1610, it was completed during the Roman period. Even Gentileschi's birth year was questioned by art historians Roberto Longhi and Andrea Emiliani, because there was an incorrect identification of her birth date. That was corrected by Bissell in 1968, after she found a public record of Gentileschi's birth year.

=== Father's guidance ===
Gentileschi's father, Orazio Gentileschi, was one of the first people in Italy to paint in the style of Caravaggio. With Gentileschi's father being her first teacher, it was not surprising that Gentileschi painted in a similar style. Art historians have different opinions about this version of Susanna and the Elders. Although there is no evidence to support them, opinions of art historians about the subject of these paintings abound. One opinion comes from Marry D. Garrard who thinks that Gentileschi is representing a rare visual of a woman who has been victimized. This is because Garrard believes that the painting could be related to Gentileschi's resistance to the sexual harassment that she received from men in her community before she was raped by Agostino Tassi. On the other hand, Gianni Papi stated his opinion that the two elders were meant to represent her father and her second teacher, Tassi, because it is thought that his harassment of her was going on in the years prior to the rape and trial. If she was being harassed by Tassi in the years leading up to the trial, Gentileschi could have been portraying her feelings of the harassment through this subject matter.

=== Provenance ===
The painting was in the collection of the artist Benedetto Luti by summer 1714. At that time he was copying it for Lothar Franz von Schönborn. He had mentioned it as a work of Orazio Gentileschi in a letter that year to his patron's assistent Hofrat Bauer von Heppenstein, who was a councilor to Lothar Franz von Schönborn, archbishop of Mainz. By 1719, the painting was part of the Schönborn collection. Joseph Heller's 1845 guidebook to the Schönborn collection at Pommersfelden included the first published attribution to Artemisia.

== See also ==
- List of works by Artemisia Gentileschi
- Self-portraiture
