= Maximilian von Welsch =

Johann Maximilian von Welsch (1671 – 15 October 1745) was a German architect, construction director and fortress master builder.

== Life ==
Maximilian von Welsch is regarded as a prominent representative of baroque fortress building in the Holy Roman Empire. Besides this he got reputation with the construction of several palaces.

Von Welsch was born in Kronach, belonging to the Prince-Bishopric of Bamberg at that time. He studied construction during his early education journeys mainly to European capitals such as Vienna, Rome and Paris. There he studied the buildings of Johann Bernhard Fischer von Erlach, Francesco Borromini and François Mansart.

He was made an imperial knight with the title Edler von Welsch for his services to architecture by Charles VI, Holy Roman Emperor in 1714.

=== Opus ===
Since 1695 he was in imperial military service and as a military engineer responsible for the construction of fortresses. In 1704 the Archbishop of Mainz Lothar Franz von Schönborn recognised his good reputation and employed Welsch for the upgrading and extension of the fortress Mainz. In Mainz he was not only responsible for the construction of the fortress, but Lothar Franz von Schönborn assigned him also with the architectural design of his summer residence Favorite opposite the confluence of the Main river with the Rhine. Von Welsch was the responsible civil engineer and master builder of this place. In 1793 the Favorite was destroyed by the Prussians during the Siege of Mainz.

As the renowned architect was appointed High Director of Building of the prince-elector of Mainz and of Bamberg (until 1729), he was responsible for quite a lot of palace extensions and new constructions. Together with Johann Dientzenhofer - both having built the Mainzer Favorite - he took part in the construction of Schloss Weißenstein in Pommersfelden, since 1711, as well as in the construction of the central block of Biebrich palace. At the Würzburg Residence and the Fulda Orangerie Welsch was working as a consultant at least . Due to his buildings, Welsch was already famous in his lifetime and had been gentled 1714 in Vienna by the emperor.

At least since the 1720s Maximilian von Welsch had been displaced more and more by the ambitious Balthasar Neumann, the most renowned baroque architect of Germany at that time. Already planned projects had been taken over by Neumann, but these were executed only with strong modifications or totally redesigned, like the Rococo pilgrimage church Vierzehnheiligen. Amorbach Abbey (commenced 1742) can be traced back to von Welschs design. He could not experience to see the completion of the building. He died in Mainz.

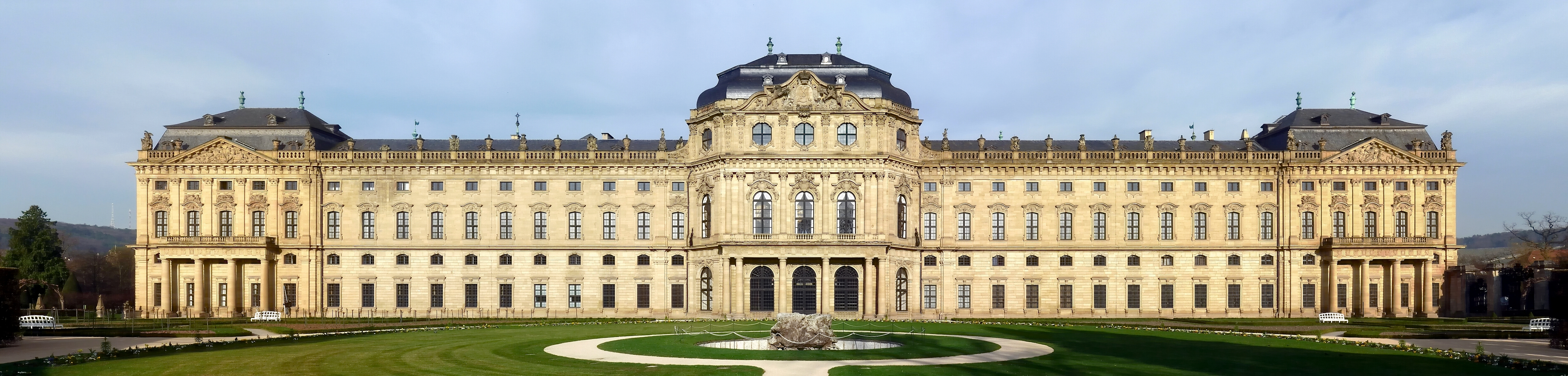
Original - The front façade of the Würzburg Residence, a palace of the former Prince-Bishops of Würzburg, Germany.

== Selected works ==
- Fortresses:
  - Fortress Mainz Mainz
  - Philippsburg
  - Petersberg Citadel (1665)
  - Kehl
- Palaces
  - Schloss Biebrich
  - Summer palace Favorite (Mainz) (destroyed 1793)
  - Schloss Bruchsal (drafts and initial execution)
  - Würzburg Residence (partially esthetical execution)
  - Schloss Weißenstein in Pommersfelden (Marstall)
  - Fulda Orangerie
- Kurmainzische Statthalterei Erfurt
- Amorbach Abbey
- New Armoury Mainz
- High Altars in the Mainz’ Kartause, St. Quintin's Church, Mainz and in the collegial church of Ellwangen
