= 1718 in architecture =

The year 1718 in architecture involved some significant events.

== Buildings and structures ==
=== Buildings ===
- In Pascagoula, Mississippi, the Old Spanish Fort is built.
- In Bengal, the mazar of Saint Shah Sultan Mahi Swar Balkhi is built, a single domed mosque.
- In Bavaria, Schloss Weißenstein is completed to the designs of Johann Dientzenhofer and Johann Lukas von Hildebrandt.
- In London, St Alfege Church, Greenwich, rebuilt by Nicholas Hawksmoor, is consecrated, the first completed work of the Commission for Building Fifty New Churches.
- The church of Santa Cristina, Turin, is completed under guidance of Filippo Juvarra.
- Temple in Shotover Park, Oxfordshire, an early example of Gothic Revival architecture in England.
- Willmer House in Farnham, England, a noted example of brick building.

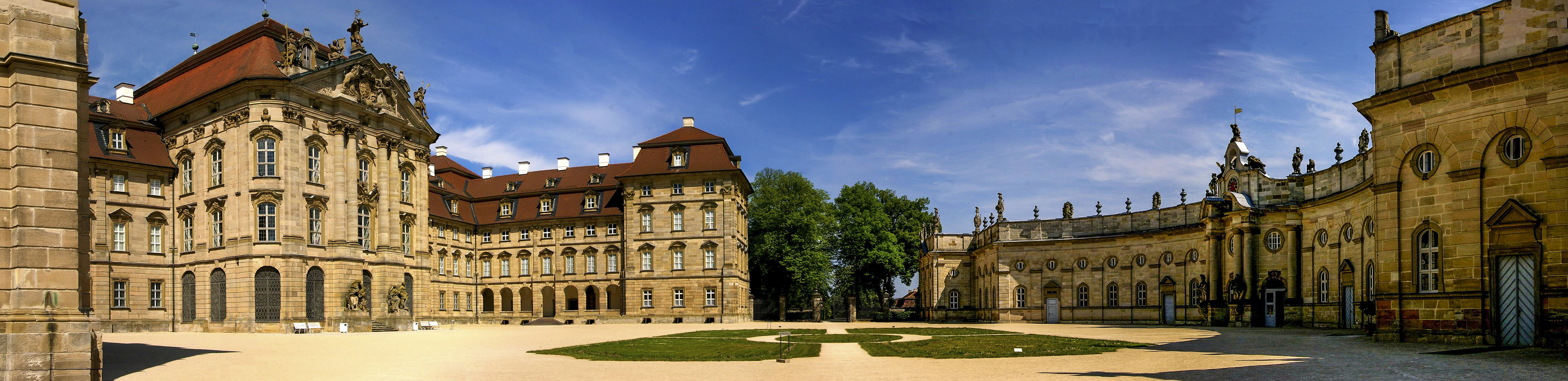
Schloss Weißenstein

== Births ==
- February – John Vardy, English neo-Palladian architect (died 1765)
- March 21 – Friedrich August Krubsacius, Dresden architect (died 1789)
- May 14 – Mario Gioffredo, Neapolitan architect, engineer and engraver (died 1785)

== Deaths ==
- September 11 – Domenico Martinelli, Italian baroque architect (born 1650)
