= Anselm Franz von Ritter zu Groenesteyn =

Anselm Franz Freiherr von Ritter zu Groenesteyn (also von Grünstein) (1692–1765) was a Chamberlain of Electoral Mainz, privy counsellor, Majordomo, temporarily Vitztum (vicegerent), High Director of Building and exceptionally gifted architect. His grandfather Stefan von Ritter zu Groenesteyn was of Dutch origin.

== Selected works ==
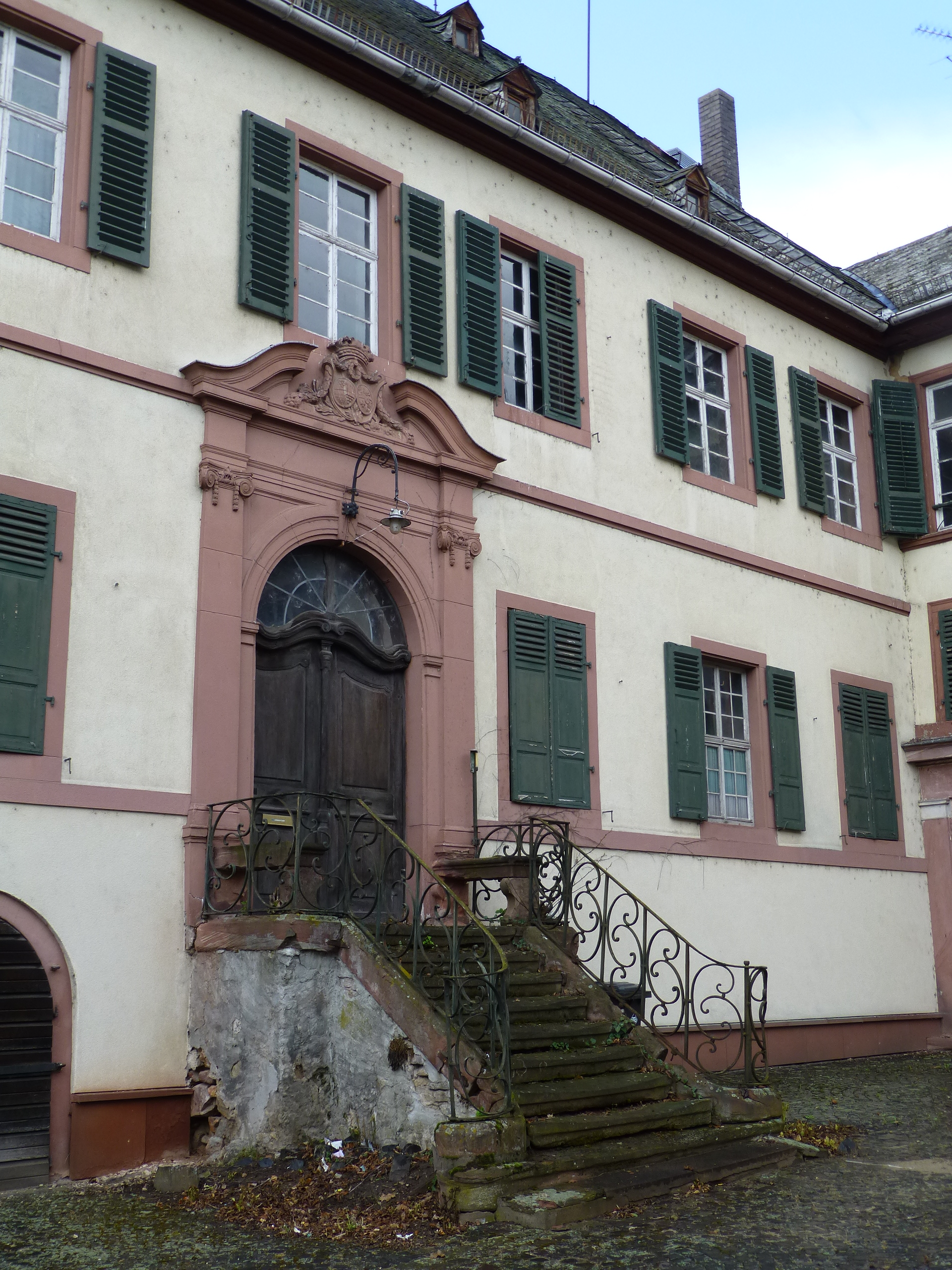
Schloss Groenesteyn is in need for repairs in Rüdesheim am Rhein, (Hesse).

He took part in many great civil works in the regions under the influence of the Schönborn family. Because of this he planned or constructed at least in part the following buildings:

- Deutschhaus Mainz (Commandry of the Teutonic Knights"))
- Bassenheimer Hof in Mainz
- Draft of Stadioner Hof in Mainz
- Baroque Château Bruchsal, of the new residence of the newly appointed bishop of Speyer
- Würzburg Residence
- Château Jägersburg, the summer residence of the prince-bishop of Bamberg in Eggolsheim/Forchheim
- Church of Banz Abbey/Franconia
- Church of Amorbach Abbey/Odenwald
- Stone balustrade of Château Biebrich in Wiesbaden-Biebrich
- Château Bönnigheim

He tore down the Schwalbacherhof in Kiedrich in the Rheingau, which came into family ownership through the marriage of his grandfather Stefan to the daughter of the house. In 1730 he erected Schloss Groenesteyn, a Baroque three-winged palace including a chapel, on the site. As stucco plasterer he chose Georg Hennicke from Mainz, a disciple of the Frenchman Jean Bérain, who had also worked on the pilgrimage church Zum heiligen Blut in Walldürn. The château is still family property.
