= Bassenheimer Hof =

Coordinates: 49°59′52″N 8°16′04″E

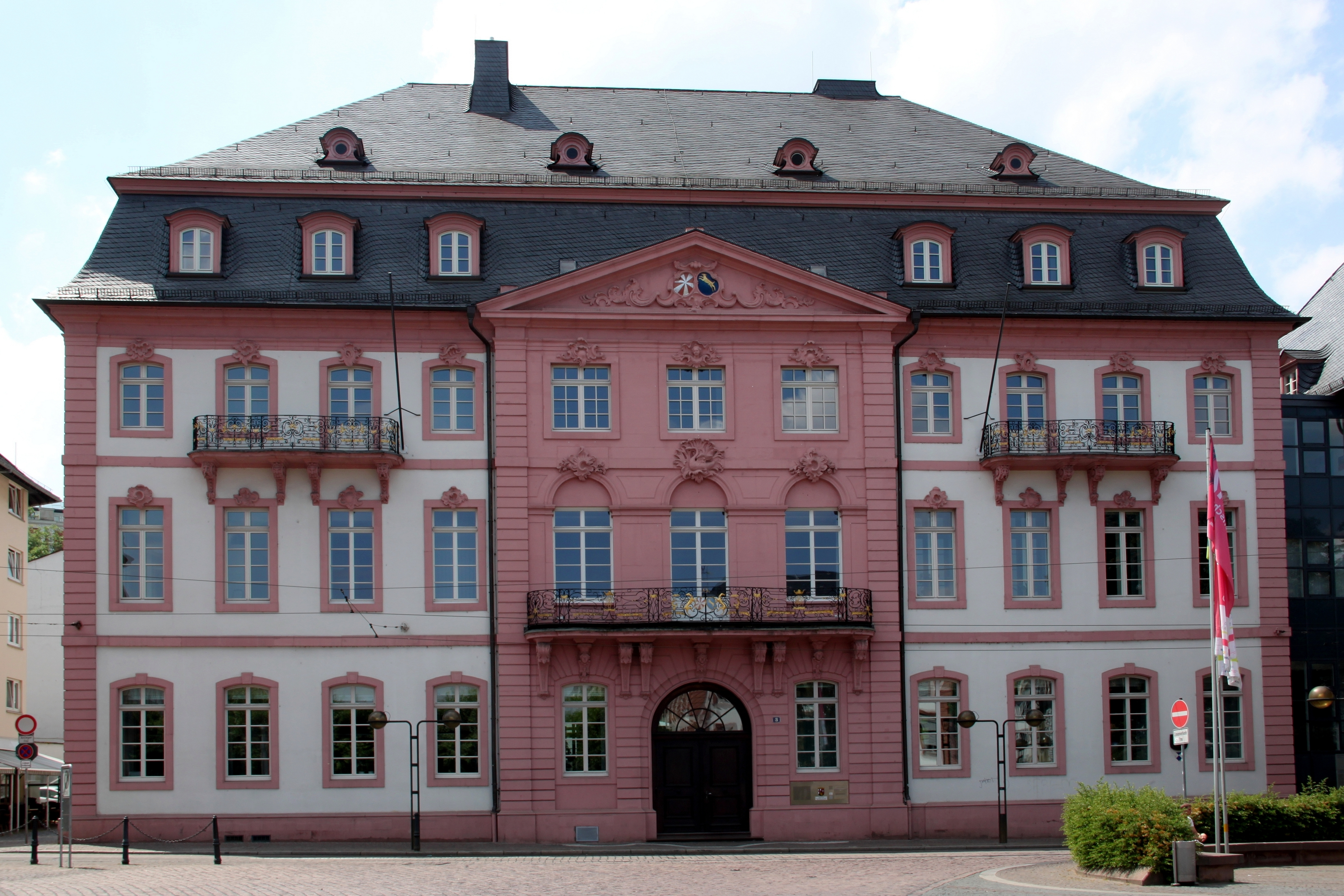
Bassenheimer Hof

The Bassenheimer Hof (Bassenheimer Palace) is an historic building in Mainz, western Germany.

At present (2009) the large structure is the seat of the Ministry of the Interior and Sports of the federal state of Rhineland-Palatinate.

== History ==
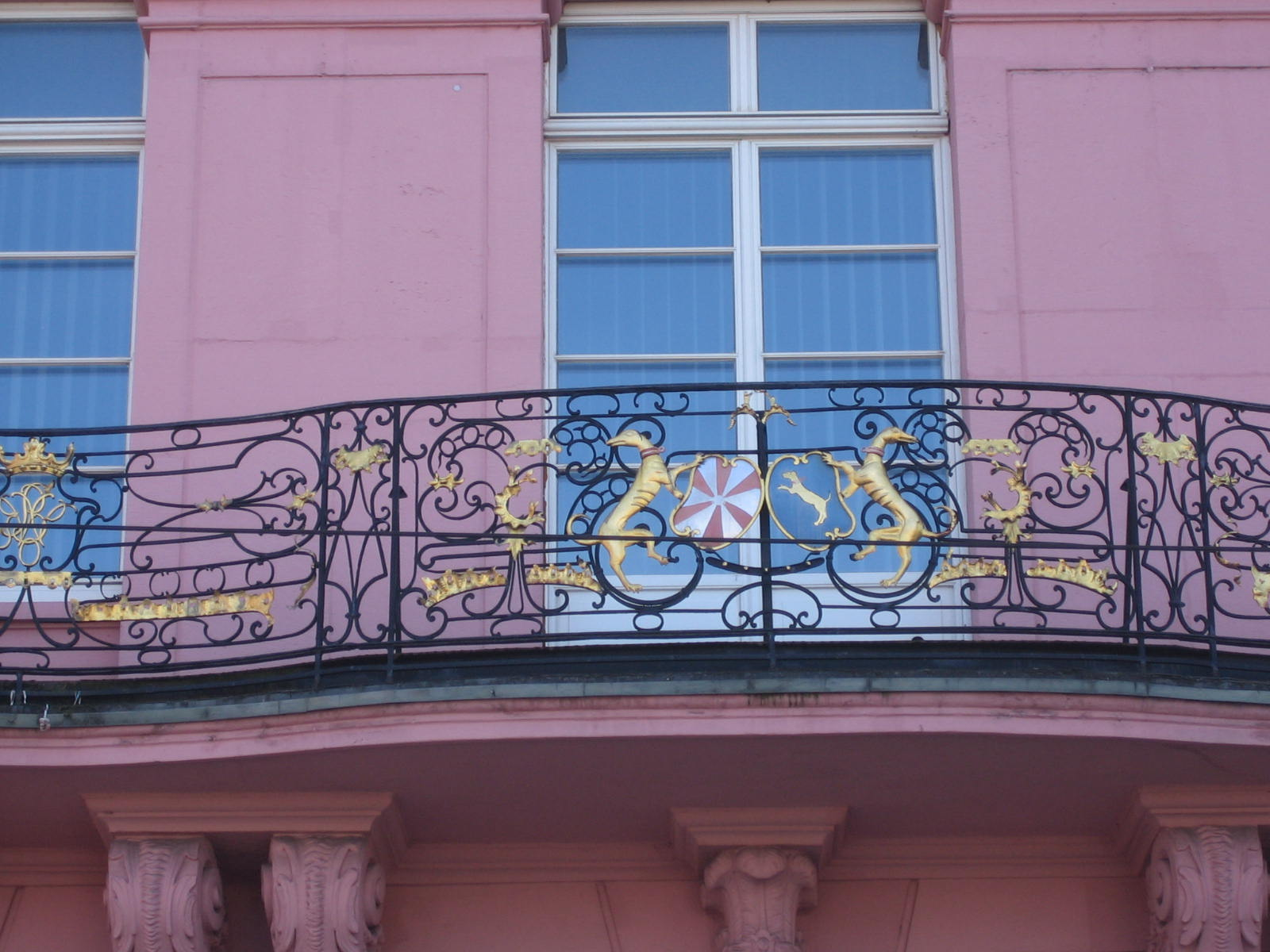
Coat of arms of the Bassenheim family in Mainz.

The Bassenheimer Hof was erected in 1750 per the plans of the electoral master builder (Oberbaudirektor) Anselm Franz von Ritter zu Groenesteyn (or Grünstein) on behalf of the prince-elector as a retirement home for his sister the widow, the countess of Bassenheim. It was built near the Osteiner Hof.

The architect had been particularly impressed, during his studies in Paris, by the Place Vendôme and Hôtel de Torcy (Hôtel de Beauharnais), with their formal statements and their elegant construction, reflecting the baroque French style.

In 1792 Mainz was invaded and occupied by Adam Philippe, Comte de Custine, at which time the clergy and nobility portion of the town's populace fled for safety. By 1835 the Bassenheimer Hof had been sold to the military government, and was converted into a barracks. It continued as a barracks until 1889. As a result of this and other conversions, the original interior layout, as well as that of the surrounding gardens, is no longer in evidence.

After 1889 the interior space of the building was utilized as a coffee shop, then for the manufacturing of embroidered flags. During World War II the building was burned to the ground (1942). The French military government ordered its reconstruction in 1947–1948.

The reconstructed building served as the temporary site of the minister president of the German federal state of Rhineland-Palatinate, before its present use by Rhineland-Palatinate (beginning in 1960).
