= Schloss Weißenstein =

Historic Royal Palace in Bavaria, Southern Germany

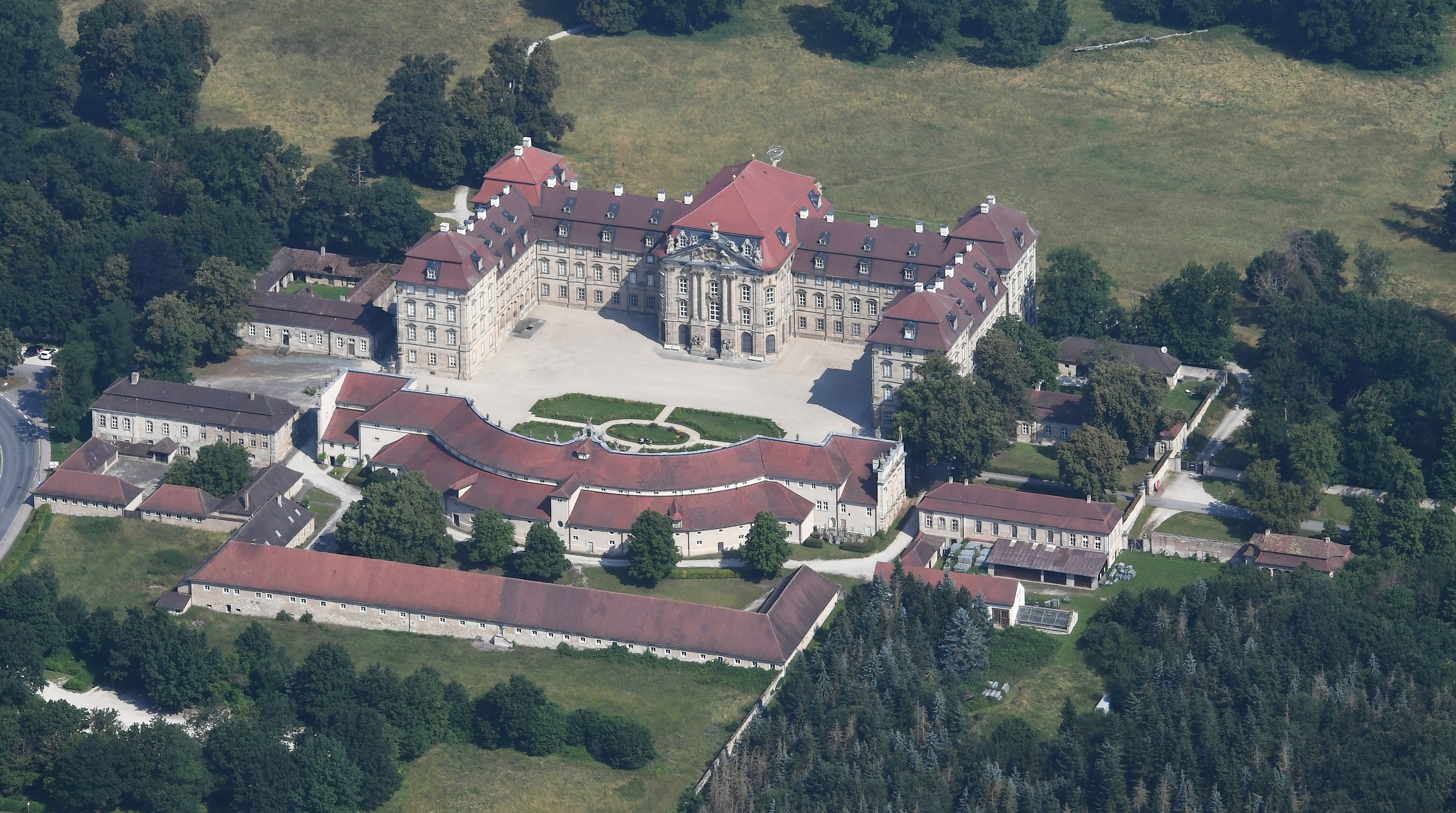
- Aerial view of the Schloss

- Location within Bavaria Location within Germany
- Alternative names: Schloss Pommersfelden

General information
- Architectural style: Baroque
- Location: Pommersfelden, Germany
- Coordinates: 49°45′47″N 10°49′16″E
- Construction started: 1711
- Completed: 1718 (1719 outbuildings)
- Client: Lothar Franz von Schönborn
- Owner: Schönborn family

Design and construction
- Architects: Johann Dientzenhofer; Johann Lukas von Hildebrandt; Maximilian von Welsch; Anselm Franz von Ritter zu Groenesteyn

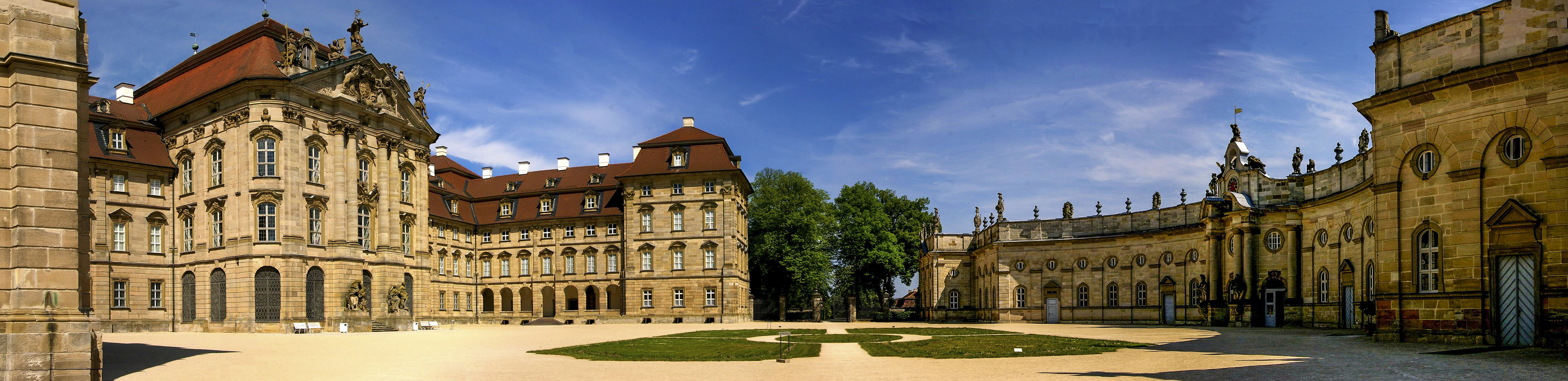
Courtyard

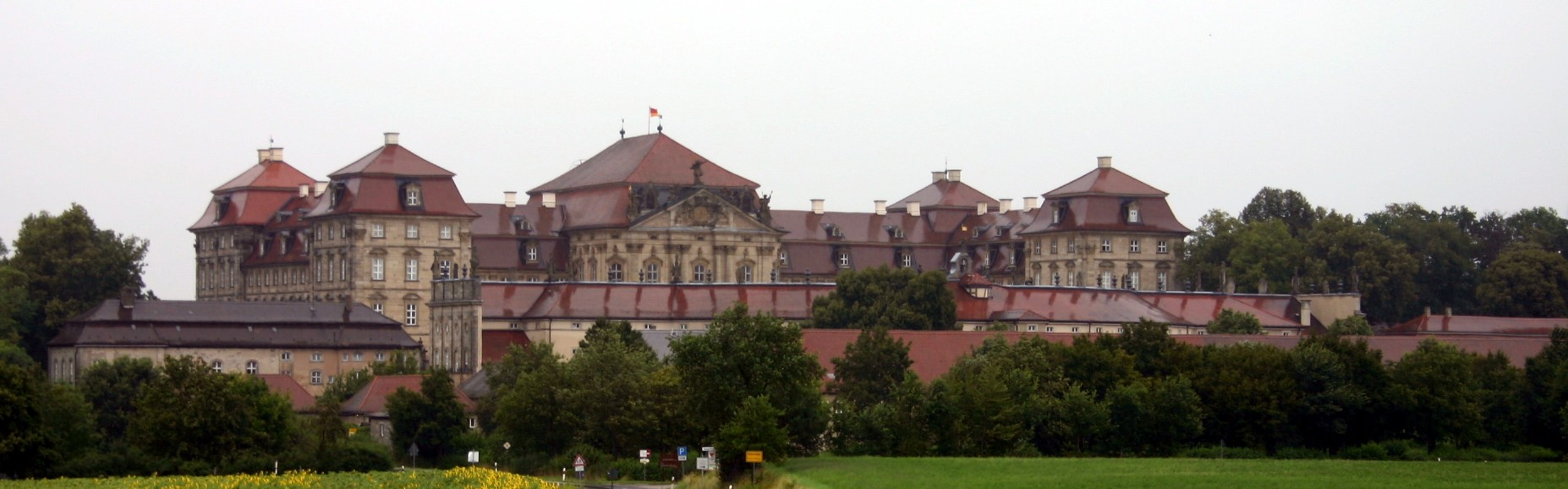
View from the south

Schloss Weißenstein is a Schloss or palatial residence in Pommersfelden, Bavaria, southern Germany. It was designed for Lothar Franz von Schönborn, Prince-Bishop of Bamberg and Archbishop of Mainz, to designs by Johann Dientzenhofer and Johann Lukas von Hildebrandt. Weißenstein, built as a private summer residence, remains in the Schönborn family. It is considered a masterwork of Baroque architecture.

== Location ==
Schloss Weißenstein is located in the Upper Franconian district of Bamberg in the village of Pommersfelden, Bavaria, Germany.

== History ==
In 1710, Lothar Franz von Schönborn, Prince-Bishop of Bamberg and Archbishop of Mainz, inherited the estate after the local family, the Truchsesse of Pommersfelden had died out. He ordered the construction of a palace as a private summer residence, paid for from his personal wealth. In 1711, he had helped ensure the election of Karl VI who rewarded him with a gift of 100,000 gulden. A team of architects including Johann Dientzenhofer who had previously built the Fulda Cathedral and the church at Kloster Banz and Johann Lukas von Hildebrandt, the court architect of Emperor Karl VI, worked on the palace. The Marstall (stables) and park were designed by Schönborn's own court architect, Maximilian von Welsch. Anselm Franz von Ritter zu Groenesteyn designed many of the outbuildings. The local head of construction was the Jesuit priest Nikolaus Loyson (1676–1720).

The palace was built between 1711 and 1719 from local sandstone materials, the colour of which gave rise to the name of the palace ("white stone"). The grand stairway was the first such structure built in the Baroque style in Germany. The interior art was finished in 1723. Contributors included Johann Michael Rottmayr, Johann Rudolf Byss and Giovanni Francesco Marchini.

After the death of Lothar Franz in 1729, the palace passed to his nephew Friedrich Karl von Schönborn who had the park expanded. A plan by Balthasar Neumann was however, only partially realized. In the early 19th century, the park was transformed from its original Baroque form into an English landscape garden.

During the Seven Years' War the palace was attacked and damaged by Prussian troops.

Minor restoration work was done in the late 19th century. More recently, preservation work has been done between 1975 and 2003.

== Description ==
=== Main building ===
The main building (corps de logis) is flanked by two wings that open towards the inner courtyard by way of arcades. In the direction of this cour d'honneur the central part of the main building extends quite noticeably, to accommodate the large central staircase. The middle pavilion of the main wing sits on a pedestal-like ground floor and features two full upper floors with high windows. The other parts of the building have only one main floor and one mezzanine floor, with the exception of the pavilions sitting at the end of the two wings, which have two main floors and one mezzanine floor (the latter housing the guest rooms). All the facades are covered by light gray sandstone, sculptures and window frames are made from yellow-greenish sandstone.

The triangular gable of the main building on the garden front with its coat of arms of the Schönborns has been carved from the same material. Colossal statues of Endymion and Diana flank the gable. It is ornamented by two figures, one holding a sheaf, the other a horn of plenty. All of these were likely made by Nikolaus Rösch. The gable is topped by a statue of Atlas holding up the sky.

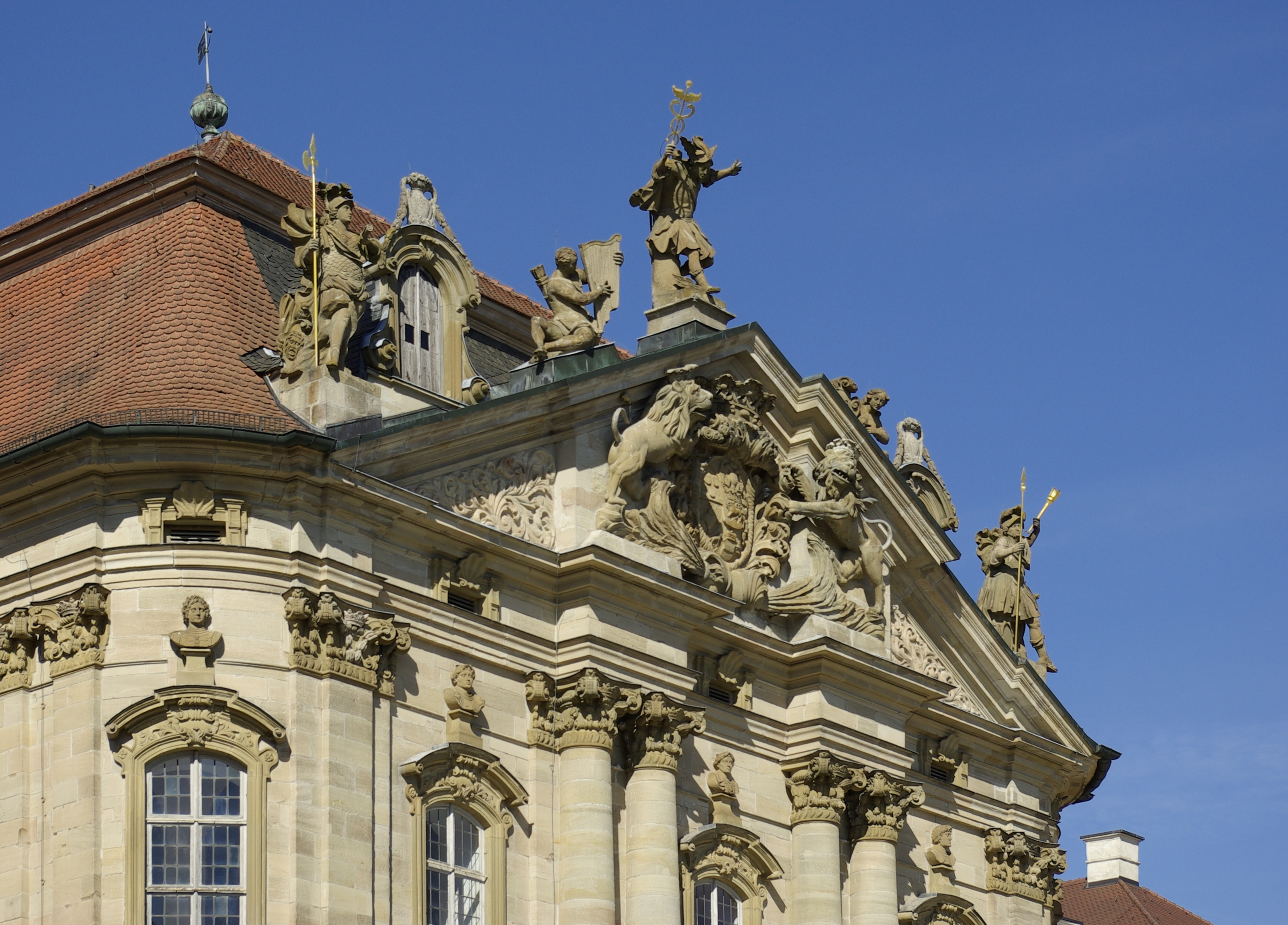
Gable facing the courtyard

The gable facing the cour d'honneur also has the family coat of arms, flanked by lions and crowned by Mercury. To the left is a figure of Athena, a symbol of peace and science, to the right is a warrior with spear and torch, symbolizing the just-ended War of the Spanish Succession. The gable also shows a lute player and a figure holding another Schönborn coat of arms.

There are four sculpture groups (sandstone) in front of the ground floor of the main pavilion, two each on the garden and the courtyard side. They were likely made by Burkard Zammels, who worked here in 1718–20. On the garden front, the statues show Pluto and Proserpina on the left and Apollo and Daphne on the right. On the cour d'honneur side, the figures are somewhat obscure and have been interpreted as allegories of Justice & Victory and Vigilance & Truth. A carved dog wears a collar with the initials "LFC", referring to the builder, Lothar Franz Churfürst.

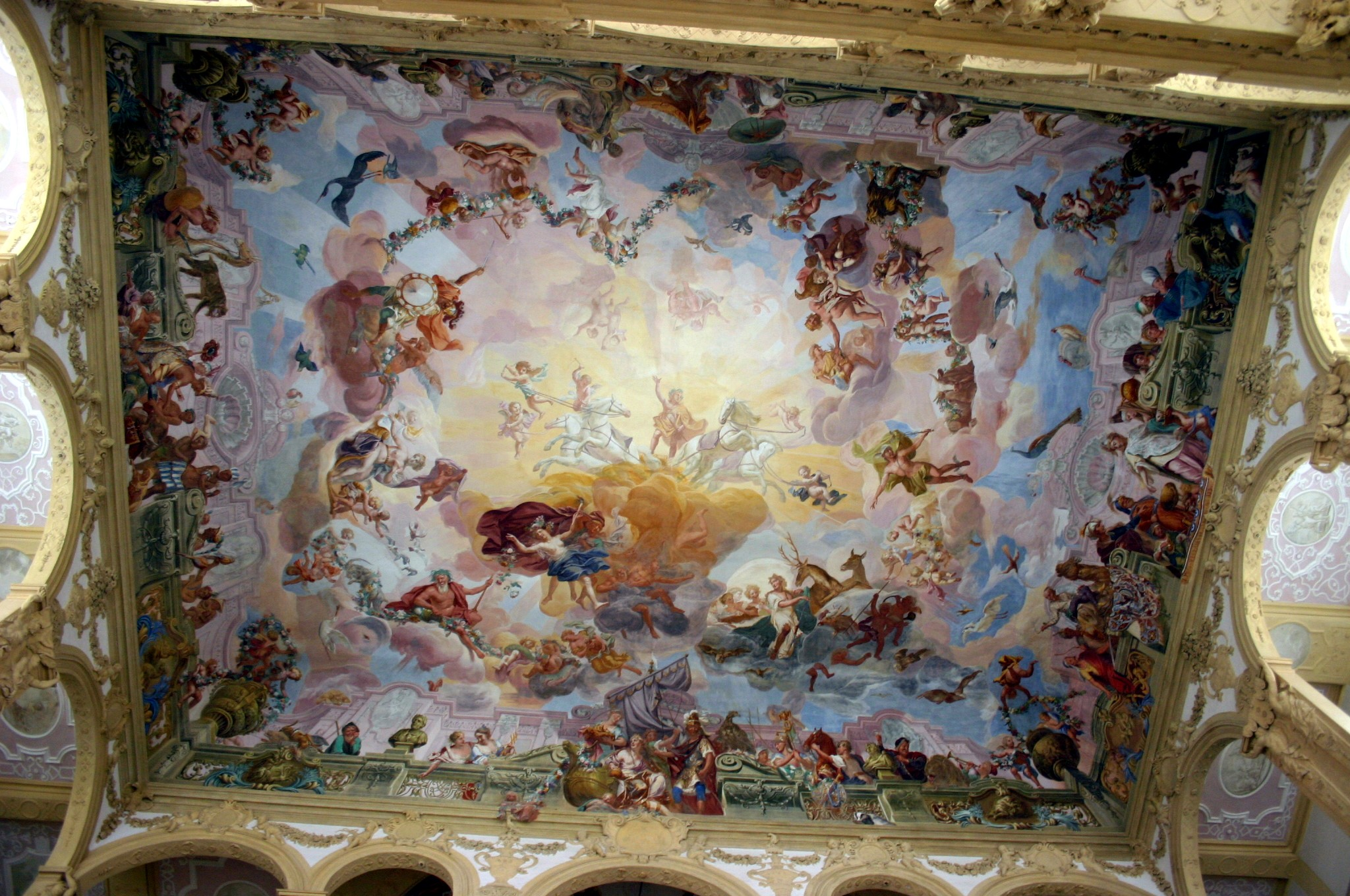
Ceiling fresco above the stairway

The grand staircase extends through all three floors of the main pavilion. As suggested by Hildebrandt, galleries overlook the stairwell on both upper floors. The large ceiling fresco by Johann Rudolf Byss (1713), who later became the director of the palace gallery of paintings, shows the four then known continents, around a central sun wagon of Phoebus Apollo. Sculptures (Jupiter, Juno, Urania and Cosmos) were made by Zammels. The vases, putti and pair of children are by P. Benkert and his workshop. Stucco work was done by Daniel Schenk. Painted railings that extend the real architectural features are by Marchini.

He also was responsible for Trompe-l'œil work in the Gartensaal flight of rooms on the ground floor, accessed between the two flights of stairs. His work is in evidence in both side halls. To the west he created an image of Ionic columns flanking views of an ideal Italian landscape under a sky populated by Flora and Pomona floating on clouds. To the east, painted columns give views of angels who face a "collapsing" entryway. The central hall has a ceiling fresco showing the allegorical "times of the day" by Johann Jakob Gerbhardt. The room had been turned into a grotto by Georg Hennicke, who applied semi-precious stones and seashells to the walls. He also added various animal and putti figures. The four larger-than-life stucco statues of the four elements were made by Zammels.

On the first floor is the main hall of the palace, the Marmorsaal (marble hall), also facing the garden. Pilasters and columns of red stucco marble are set off from green walls. Situated on sills are stucco figurines by Zammels, showing allegories of the Turkish and Persian monarchies on the inner wall and of the Roman and Greek monarchies on the outer wall. In the corners, the Four Ages are depicted. The ceiling fresco by Franz Michael Rottmayr shows Aurora greeted by Juno, Venus and Dionysus. In the center of each wall a virtue is shown: Justice, Strength, Industry and Wisdom. Stucco work by Daniel Schenk shows putti, vases and eagles.

=== Wings ===
The right wing contains the palace gallery of paintings and its library, with stucco work by D. Schenk and G. Hennicke after 1713. Schönborn had collected a large number of paintings by contemporary artists, many of them Dutch, that were hung in up to four vertical rows, completely covering the gallery walls. He especially treasured painting of members of his family, of the Habsburgs and other rulers and rare animal motives. Schönborn also collected East Asian porcelain delivered to him en masse by members of the Jesuits whom he supported. Other collections include Faiences made in Delft, glass and sea shells.

The palace chapel features three important works of art: an Italian Lamentation of Christ (17th century), a Man of Sorrows from Spain (ca. 1730) and a late-Gothic Mother of God.

=== Marstall ===
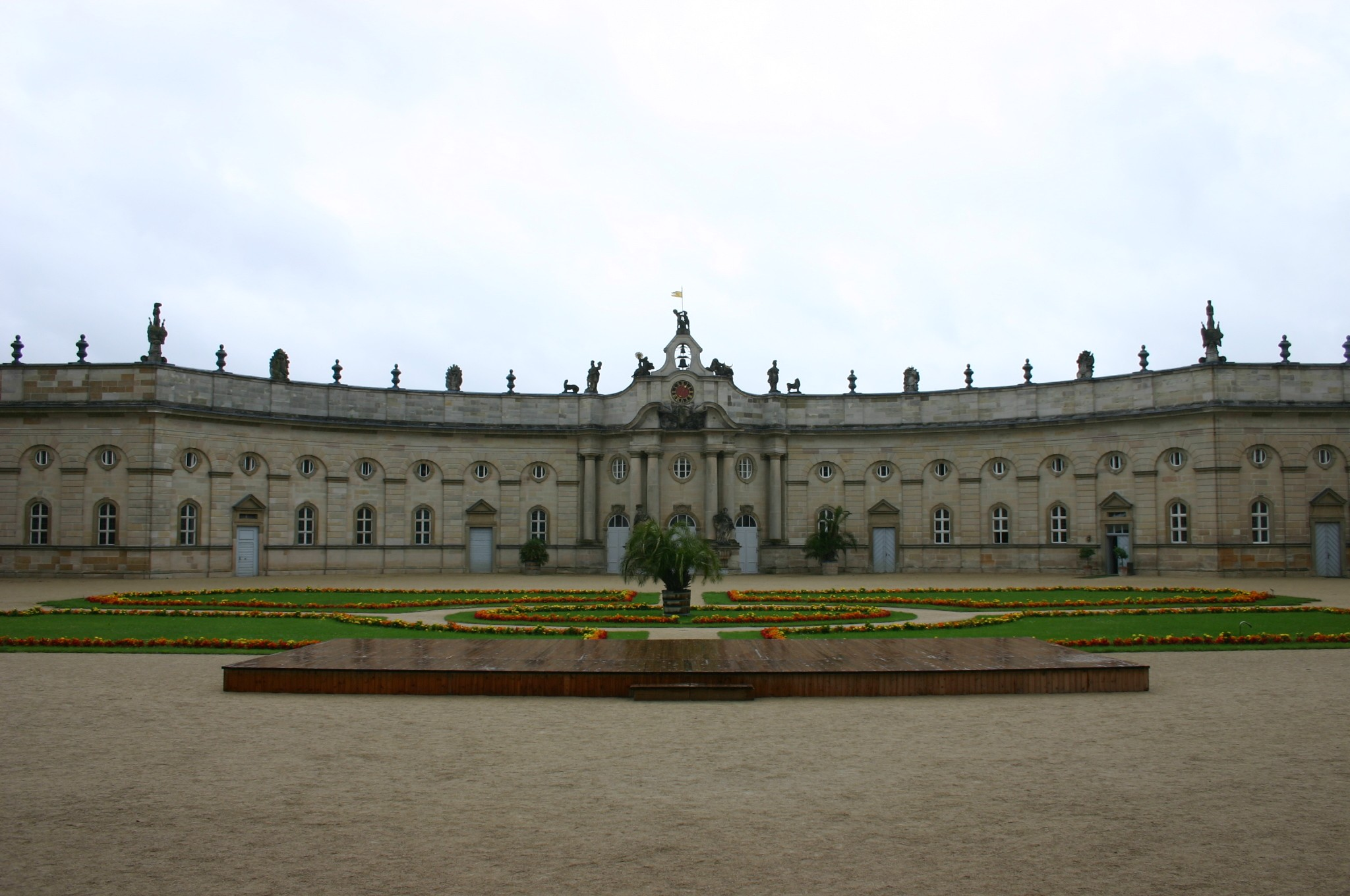
Marstall

The Marstall (stables building) is located to the south of the cour d'honneur and is connected to the wings of the palace by wrought-iron railings. Built by Johann Dientzendorffer based on plans by Maximilian von Welsch 1714—17, it has a concave front facing the courtyard. It was constructed with one floor fewer than originally intended. The Marstall features double columns adorning the central part, which is topped by a clock tower. Below this is an oval hall. Its ceiling has a fresco of Perseus and Andromeda by G.F. Marchini.

=== Garden ===
Construction of the formal garden was begun by von Welsch in 1715. After 1722, on the suggestion of his nephew Friedrich Carl, Schönborn summoned Abraham Huber from Salzburg, who by 1723 had the fountains running. The statuary was added only after Lothar Franz' death in 1741. The linden avenue was planted in 1768 with 200 linden trees from the Aischer Wald. Transformation of the formal Baroque garden into an English landscape garden began as early as 1786 under Hugo Damian Erwein von Schönborn-Wiesentheid and was completed in the 19th century.

== Today ==
The Schloss remains the property of Schönborn family. It is considered a Baroque masterwork and the combination of exterior and well-preserved interiors gives it European importance.

The palace and its park are open to the public. The Marstall and Orangerie today house a hotel (currently closed).

The palace contains the largest private Baroque art collection in Germany, containing over 600 pictures. Baroque and Renaissance artists represented include Artemisia Gentileschi, Peter Paul Rubens, Albrecht Dürer, Titian, Rembrandt and Anthony van Dyck.

== See also ==
- List of Baroque residences
- Favorite Palace
