= 1789 in architecture =

The year 1789 in architecture involved some significant events.

== Buildings and structures ==
=== Buildings ===
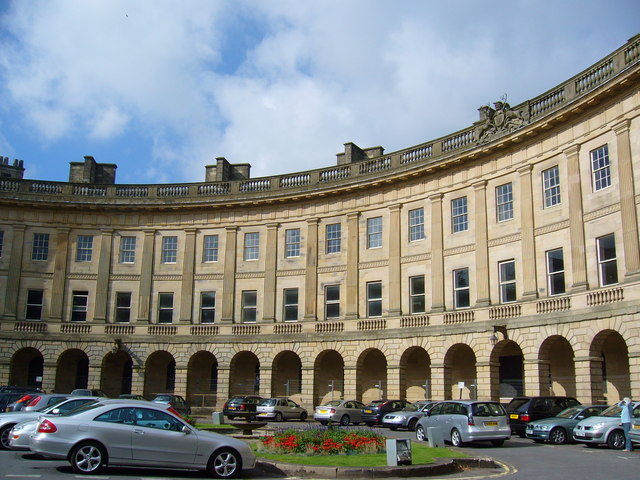
Buxton Crescent

- The main block of the Grand Pump Room, Bath, England, is begun by Thomas Baldwin.
- Cross Bath, in Bath, England, is rebuilt by Thomas Baldwin at about this date.
- Buxton Crescent in Buxton, Derbyshire, England, designed by John Carr, is completed
- New house at Newliston near Edinburgh, Scotland, designed by Robert Adam.
- The Moscow Gostiny Dvor is designed by Giacomo Quarenghi, the favourite architect of Catherine the Great.
- The rebuilt Prince Vladimir Church, Saint Petersburg, is completed to the designs of Ivan Starov.
- All Saints' Church, Newcastle upon Tyne, England, designed by David Stevenson, is consecrated.
- The First Methodist Church in Rhode Island is built, with a 160-foot spire.
- The octagonal Old Stordal Church in Norway, designed by the late priest Ebbe Carsten Tønder, is built.
- Congress Hall, Philadelphia, designed by Samuel Lewis, is completed as the county courthouse.
- Philosophical Hall, Philadelphia, is completed for the American Philosophical Society.
- The Boydell Shakespeare Gallery in London, designed by George Dance the Younger, is opened.
- The Piață Mică arcaded market hall in Transylvania is built.
- Duras Castle in Limburg (Belgium), designed by G. Henry, is completed.
- The Alma Plantation Sugar Mill in Pointe Coupee, Louisiana, is built.
- New peers' entrance to the Irish Houses of Parliament in Dublin, designed by James Gandon, is completed.

== Births ==
- December 8 – József Hild, Hungarian architect (died 1867)
- December 20 – William Burn, pioneer of the Scottish Baronial style (died 1870)
- Matthew Habershon, English architect (died 1852)

== Deaths ==
- June 14 – Tommaso Temanza, Italian Neoclassical architect and author (born 1705)
- August 7 – William Edwards, Welsh Methodist minister, stonemason, architect and bridge engineer, best known for the Old Bridge, Pontypridd (born 1719)
- November 28 – Friedrich August Krubsacius, German architect and architectural theoretician (born 1718)
