= Leonhard Dientzenhofer =

German builder and architect

Leonhard Dientzenhofer (also: Johann Leonhard Dientzenhofer; 20 February 1660 – 26 November 1707) was a German builder and architect from the well known Dientzenhofer family of architects.

== Life and work ==
Leonhard was born in St. Margarethen (Bavaria), District of Rosenheim, the seventh child of Georg Dientzenhofer and Anna Thanner. His four brothers, Georg, Wolfgang, Christoph and Johann, were also well-known architects/builders. On 30 January 1685 in Waldsassen, he married Maria Anna Hager, a sister of the wife of his brother Georg. They had three sons and four daughters. Soon after the death of his wife Maria (6 July 1699), he married in Bamberg Anna Margaretha Sünder from Staffelstein. They had two daughters.

In 1697 he commissioned a reprint (with changed dedication and foreword) of the book Theatrum architecturae civilis by Charles Philippe Dieussart.

Leonhard died, aged 47, in Bamberg. His work on Banz Abbey was taken over by his brother Johann.

== Works ==
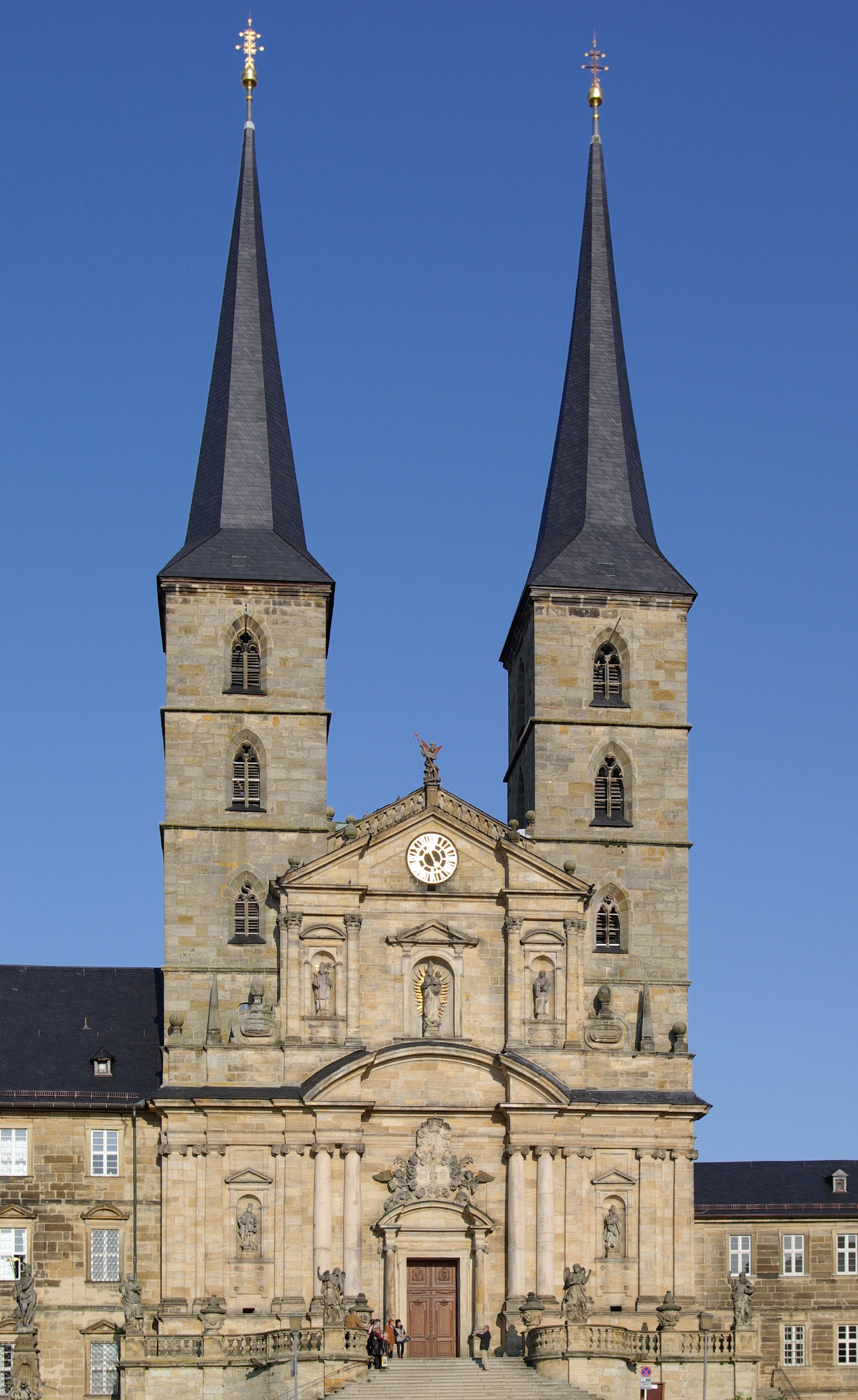
Facade of the monastery church St. Michael in Bamberg

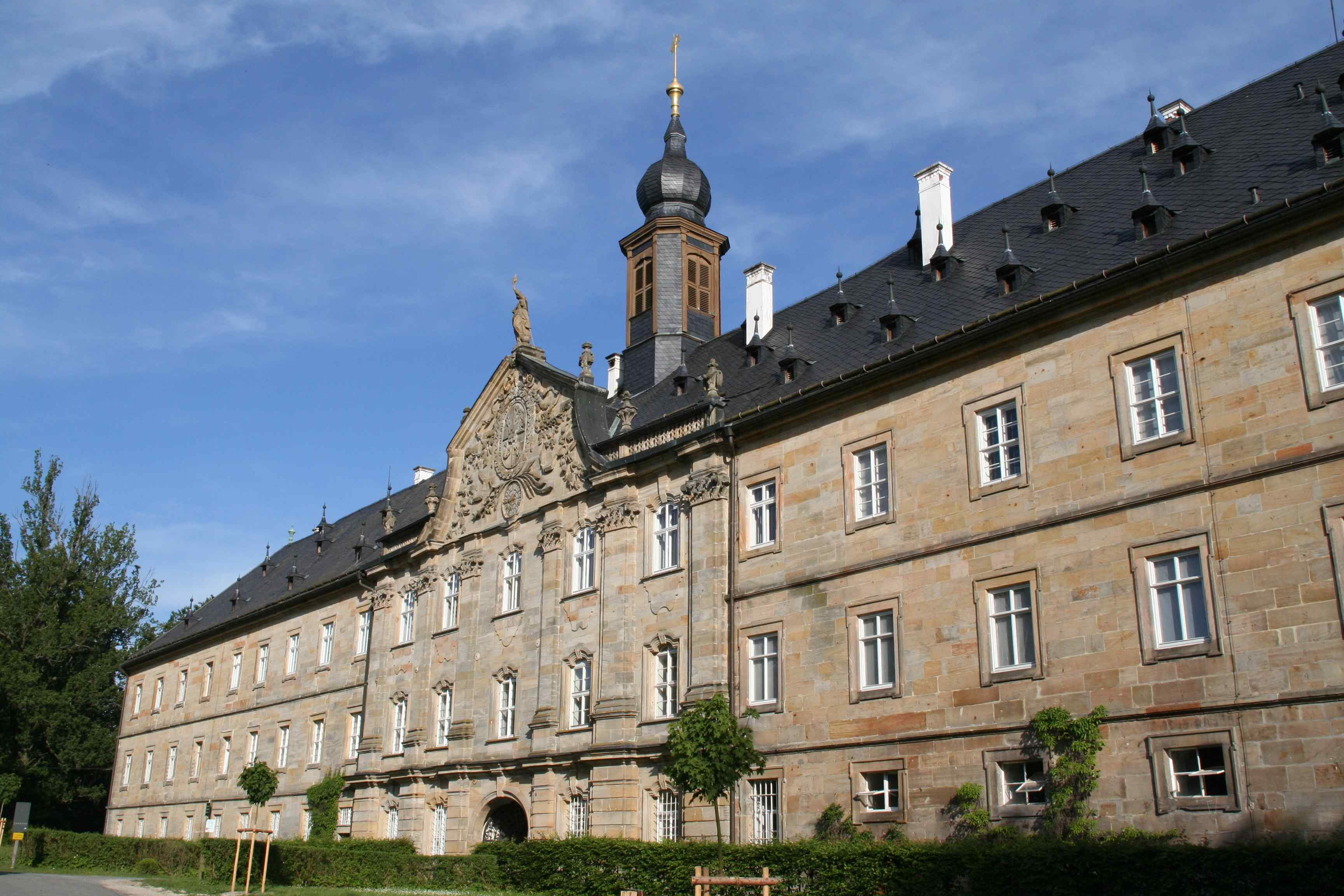
Schloss Tambach

- Bamberg
  - work on the Bishops' Residence (1697–1702)
  - Kloster Michelsberg: Kloster Building and Facade of the monastery church St. Michael

(1696–1702)

  - Curia Sancti Lamperti (Domgasse 8)
  - Reconstruction of the Carmelite monastery and church (1692–1707)
- Kloster Banz: (brother Johann also worked on Banz) (1695–1704)
- Kloster Ebrach: (1686)
- Gaibach
  - Remodeling of the castle (1694–1704)
  - Heilig-Kreuz-Kapelle (1697–1698)
- Schloss Greifenstein: remodeling in Baroque style (1691–1693)
- Hollfeld: Salvatorkirche (1704)
- Kulmbach: Langheimer Amtshof (1691)
- Kloster Langheim: overall plan (beginning 1690)
- Tambach: Schloss Tambach (1694–1700)
- Schöntal im Jagsttal: Cloister building and church (1694–1707)
- Trautmannshofen: Plan for the pilgrimage church Mariä Namen (construction Georg Dientzenhofer, after the death of Wolfgang Dientzenhofer) (1686)

== Literature ==
- Milada Vilímková, Johannes Brucker: Dientzenhofer. Eine bayerische Baumeisterfamilie in der Barockzeit. Rosenheimer Verlagshaus, 1989, ISBN 3-475-52610-7
- Hans Zimmer: Die Dientzenhofer. Ein bayerisches Baumeistergeschlecht in der Zeit des Barock. Rosenheim 1976, ISBN 3-475-52149-0
- Allgemeine Deutsche Biographie, Bd. 3, S. 651
- Reclams Kunstführer Bayern, ISBN 3-15-008055-X
