= Johann Dientzenhofer =

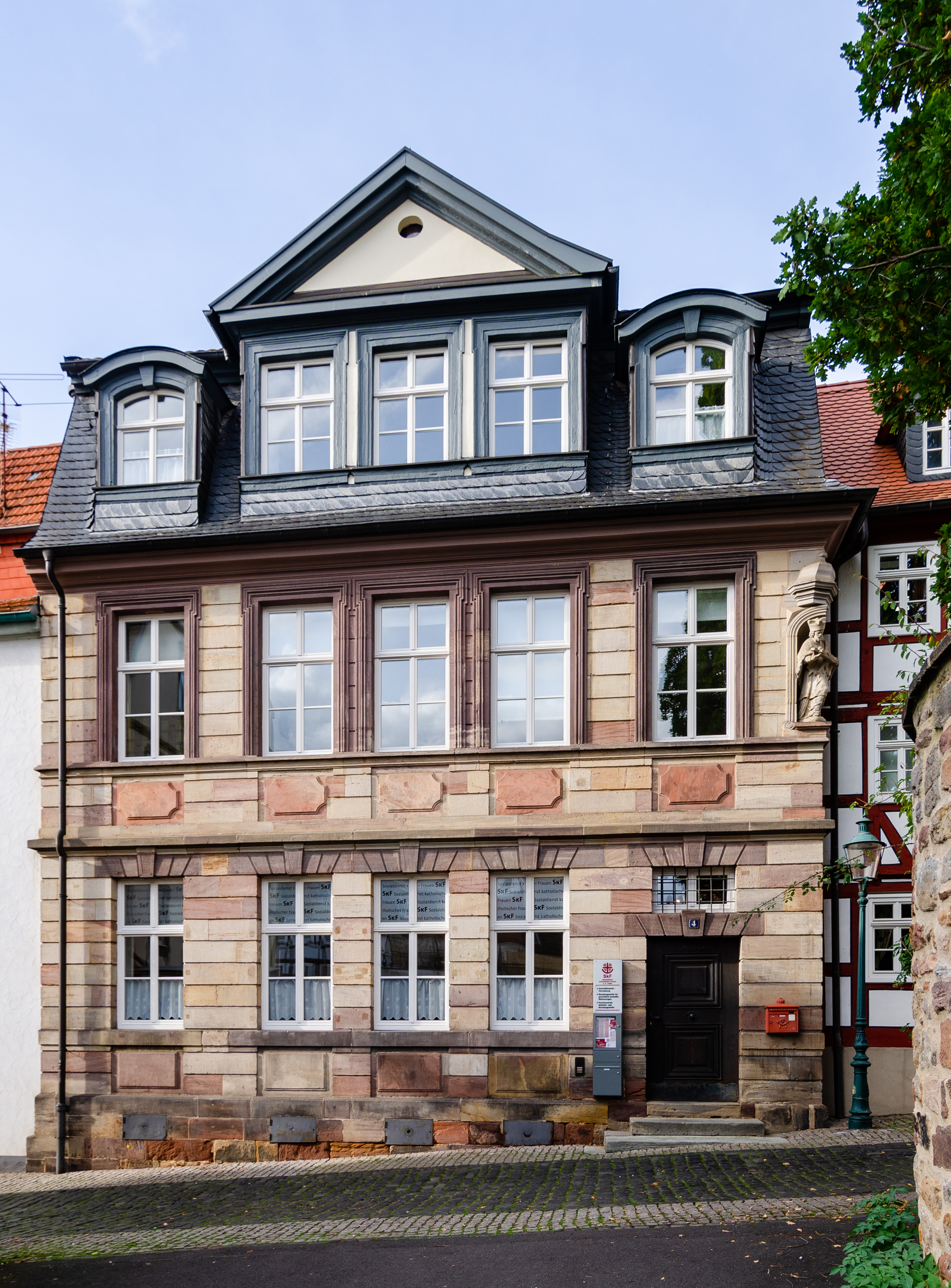
Baroque house Rittergasse 4 in Fulda, home of Johann Dientzenhofer, built by himself in 1710

Johann Dientzenhofer (25 May 1663 – 20 July 1726) was a builder and architect during the Baroque period in Germany.

== Life ==
Johann was born at the family farm in St. Margarethen near Rosenheim, Bavaria, a member of the famous Dientzenhofer family of German architects, who were among the leading builders in the Bohemian and German Baroque He was the youngest of eight children of Georg and Barbara Thanner Dientzenhofer, which included his brothers Georg Dientzenhofer (1643–1689), Wolfgang Dientzenhofer (1648–1706), Christoph Dientzenhofer (7 July 1655 – 20 June 1722) and Leonhard Dientzenhofer (1660–1707). Johann's son Justus Heinrich Dientzenhofer (1702–1744) and his nephew Kilian Ignaz Dientzenhofer (1689–1751) also became architects.

Johann and his siblings attended school in Flintsbach. He followed his older brothers to Prague, where there were many opportunities in the building trades. In 1658 his sister Anna married Wolfgang Leuthner, presumably a relative of Prague architect and builder Abraham Leuthner. The brothers later came to work in Leuthner's construction company, where Johann learned the trade of bricklaying. He was married in Prague in 1685.

In 1692 his brother Leonhard moved to Bamberg, where in 1695 he became a court architect for the Schönborns of Bamberg and invited Johann to move there. Johann found work as a foreman overseeing construction on the Michaelsberg. In 1699 he passed the master mason's examination. That autumn, the Elector of Bamberg, Lothar Franz von Schönborn, sent Johann Dientzenhofer to Rome to improve his skills in architecture. Upon his return, in September 1700, Johann was appointed by Prince-Abbot Adalbert I von Schleifras of Fulda (1650-1714) as court architect in Fulda, the capital of the Electorate of Hesse, on the recommendation of Lothar Franz von Schönborn.

Johann's first great church was the Abbey Church at Fulda (1704–12) in Italian baroque style. In 1707 he completed the design for the church at Banz Abbey, which was started by his late brother Leonard. Lothar Franz von Schönborn offered Johann Leonard's former position as court architect at Bamberg. Johann and his family moved permanently from Fulda to Bamberg in 1708.

He was in Pommersfelden in 1711, where he designed the Schloss Weißenstein for Lothar Franz von Schönborn, Prince-Bishop of Bamberg and Archbishop of Mainz. He and Johann Lukas von Hildebrandt designed the grand staircase. Weißenstein Castle represents an important step in the development of German late Baroque palace architecture and is also Johann Dientzenhofer's most significant work.

From 1715-1718, Johann oversees the construction of a hospital in Kronach along with the hospital church of St. Anne. Between 1720 and 1723, Johann serves as building inspector for the construction of the princely bishop's residence in Würzburg, for the Prince-Bishop of Würzburg, Johann Philipp Franz von Schönborn, nephew of Lothar Franz von Schönborn.

Johann Dientzenhofer died in Bamberg.

== Works ==
- For the Prince-Abbot of Fulda:
  - Fulda Cathedral (1704–1712)
  - Fulda Stadtschloss (1707–1712)
  - Schloss Bieberstein (Hesse) (1709)
  - Schloss in Geisa
- For the Prince-Bishop of Bamberg:
  - Schloss Weißenstein by Pommersfelden (1711–1718)
  - Schloss Reichmannsdorf (1714–1719)
- For Others
  - Bad Kissingen: Neues Rathaus (1709)
  - Bamberg
    - Böttingerhaus (1708–1713)
    - Palais Rotenhan (1711–1718)
    - Bibra Palais (Bibra Haus) (1714–1716)
  - Holzkirchen (Unterfranken): Abbey Church and other buildings
  - Banz Abbey: Abbey Church and other buildings ('from 1707 after the death of his brother Leonhard Dientzenhofer who had the original commission)
  - Kleinheubach: Castle for the Princes of Löwenstein-Wertheim (using the plans of Louis de la Fosse)
  - Litzendorf: Parish church of St. Wenzel
  - Oberschwappach by Knetzgau: Schloss
  - Staffelstein: Baroque remodel of chapel on Veitsberg (1718–1719)
  - Ullstadt (Mittelfranken): Castle for the barons von Frankenstein (1718–1725)
  - Würzburg: Facade of Neumünster church (1711–1716)
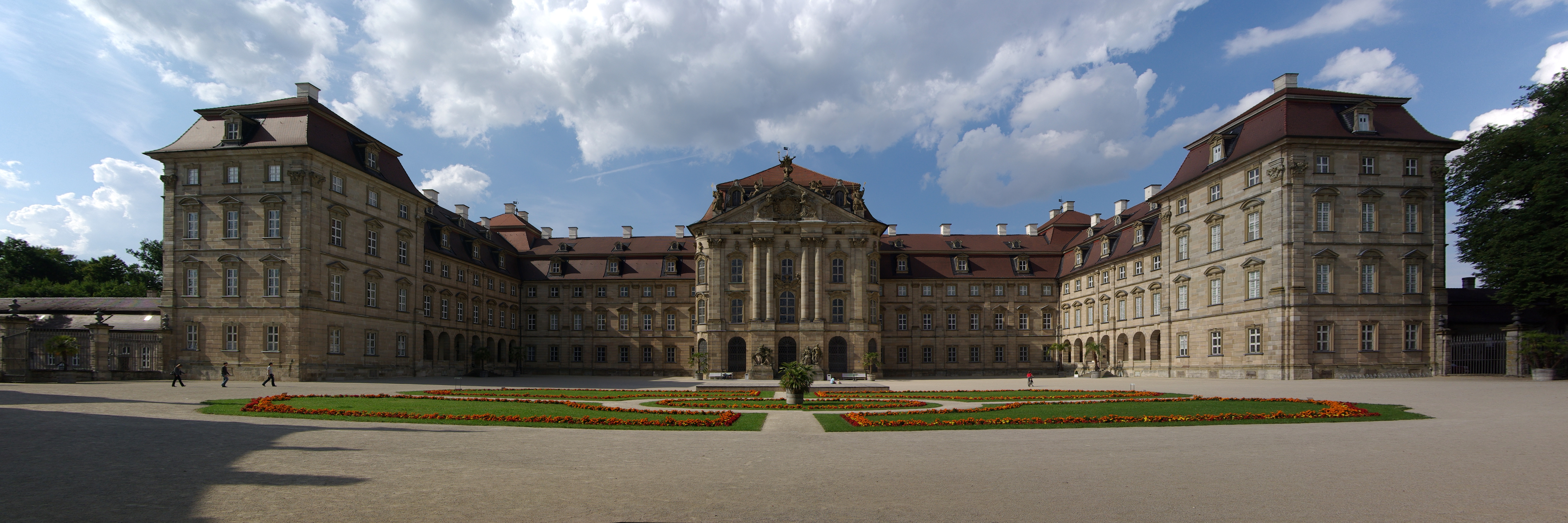
Schloss Weißenstein

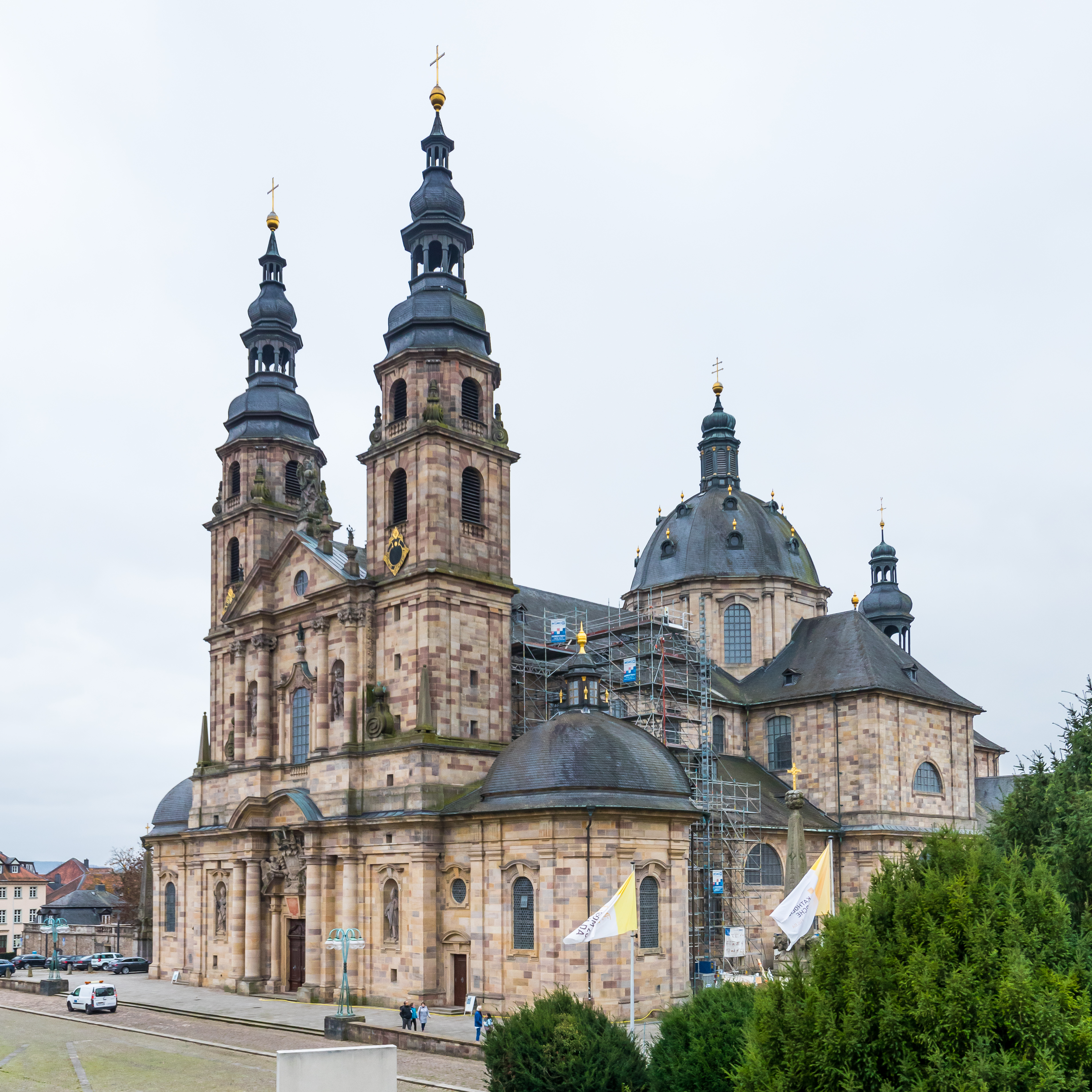
Fulda Cathedral

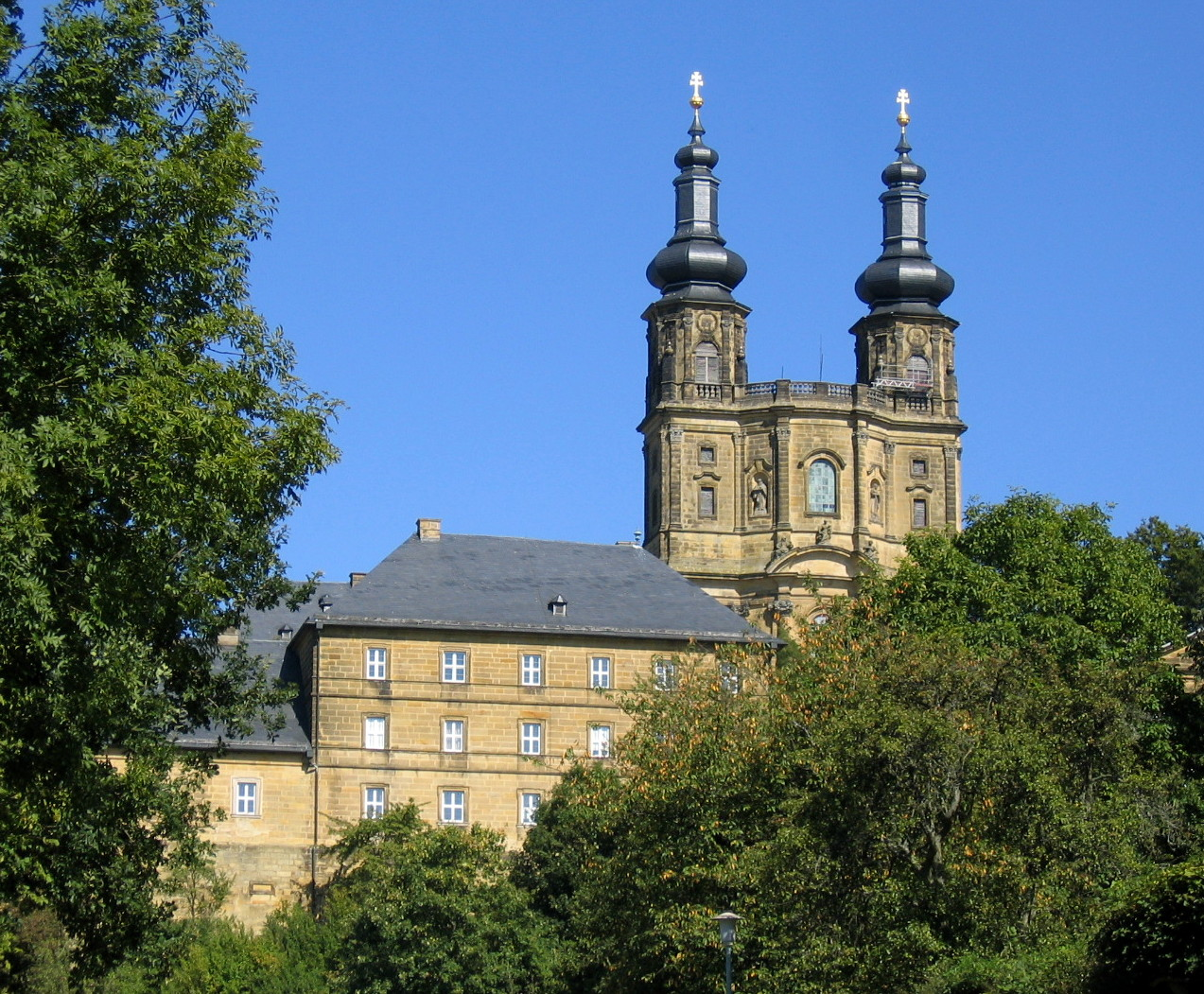
Banz Abbey

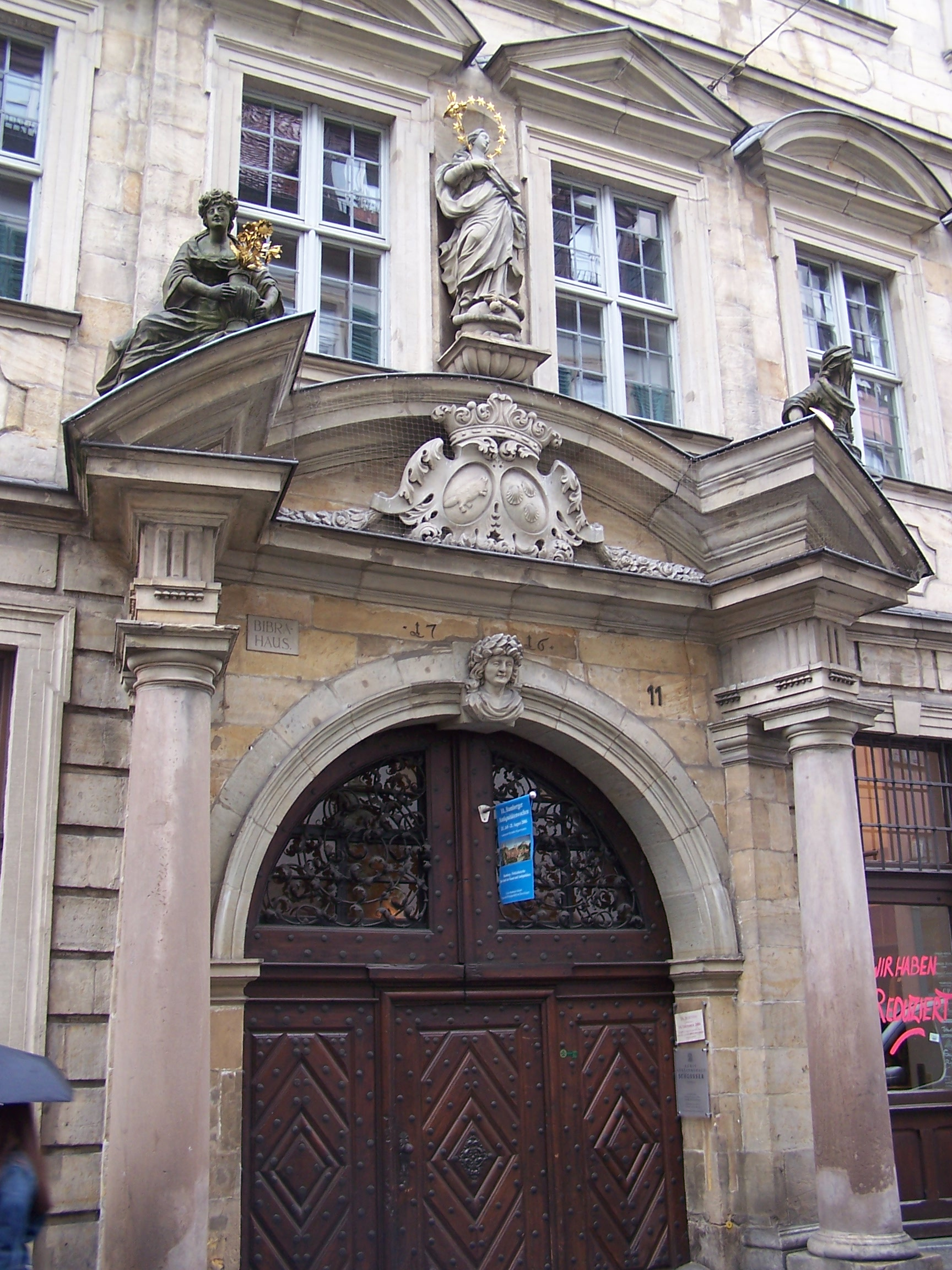
Bibra Palais (Bibra Haus), Bamberg
