= Lothar Franz von Schönborn =

Archbishop of Mainz

- Archbishop of Mainz
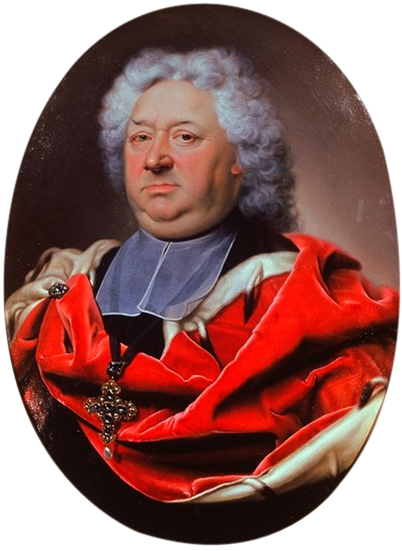
- Lothar Franz von Schönborn, ca. 1715. Portrait at Wallraf-Richartz Museum, Cologne
- Church: Catholic Church
- Diocese: Electorate of Mainz
- In office: 1694–1729

Personal details
- Born: 4 October 1655
- Died: 30 January 1729 (aged 73)

Lothar Franz von Schönborn-Buchheim (4 October 1655 – 30 January 1729) was the Archbishop-Elector of Mainz from 1694 to 1729 and the Bishop of Bamberg from 1693 to 1729. As Archbishop of Mainz, he was also Archchancellor of the Holy Roman Empire. Lothar Franz von Schönborn is known for commissioning a number of Baroque buildings, such as the palace Schloss Weissenstein.

== Family ==
Lothar Franz was born in Steinheim am Main, now a suburb of Hanau, on 4 October 1655 to Count Philipp Erwein von Schönborn (1607–1668) and Maria Ursula von Greiffenclau-Vollraths. His elder brother was Melchior Friedrich von Schönborn-Buchheim, both nephews of Johann Philipp von Schönborn, Archbishop of Mainz from 1647 until 1673, and, through their mother, grand-nephews of Georg Friedrich von Greiffenklau, Archbishop of Mainz from 1626 until 1629. Through his brother Melchior, he was uncle to the Schönborn-Buchheim branch which included Johann Philipp Franz, Friedrich Karl, Damian Hugo Philipp and Franz Georg.

== Life ==
He was educated at the Jesuit College in Aschaffenburg. In 1665, Lothar Franz was appointed Domizellar (canon) of Würzburg Cathedral. In 1667, he was appointed to the same position in Bamberg Cathedral. He received a prebendary at Mainz Cathedral in 1674. Lothar Franz made his Grand Tour through the Netherlands, France and Italy. His Biennium (two-year period of preparation) he attended from 1673 to 1675 in Vienna.

During this time he maintained a pro-imperial life stance. He was appointed canon of Bamberg in 1681 and in Würzburg in 1683. For the Bishop of Bamberg, he travelled in various diplomatic missions and was appointed President of the Court Chamber. In 1689 he was Scholastikus (schoolmaster) and curator in Bamberg and canon of Mainz. Still being a canon, he already influenced the artistic design of Schloss Gaibach at Volkach after 1694.

In 1693, Lothar Franz was elected Bishop of Bamberg. In September 1694 he was appointed coadjutor bishop of Anselm Franz von Ingelheim in rivalry with Franz Ludwig von Pfalz-Neuburg. Despite an opposing recommendation by the Emperor he succeeded Anselm Franz in 1695. During his reign, he increased taxation of the cathedral chapter and eroded some of its rights. In 1707, he was instrumental in the conversion of the Protestant Elizabeth Christina of Brunswick-Wolfenbüttel to Catholicism.

In 1711, he ensured the election of Charles VI of Austria as the Holy Roman Emperor, and crowned him in Frankfurt Cathedral. Lothar Franz was rewarded by Charles for his loyalty with 100,000 guldens with which he began the construction of Schloss Weißenstein in Pommersfelden, a Baroque palace with the largest privately owned art gallery of Germany, still today owned by the Schönborn family. He also built the New Residence of the bishops at Bamberg (1697–1703) and Favorite Palace near Mainz (1700–1722).

In 1726, Charles VI granted Palanok Castle with Mukacheve, Chynadiyovo and 200 villages in the Kingdom of Hungary (today part of Ukraine), to Elector Lothar Franz who had sent him troops to defeat Francis II Rákóczi, whose property it had previously been, and then continued to give the emperor political support. The estate, one of the largest in Eastern Europe, remained in the family well into the 20th century.

Lothar Franz von Schönborn died on 30 January 1729 at Mainz.

== Literature ==
- R.H. Thompson: Lothar Franz von Schönborn and the Diplomacy of the Electorate of Mainz. From the Treaty of Ryswick to the Outbreak of the War of the Spanish Succession, Springer Netherland 1973; ISBN 978-90-247-1346-2

Catholic Church titles
Preceded by Marquard Sebastian von Schenk von Stauffenberg	Prince-Bishop of Bamberg; 1693–1729	Succeeded by Friedrich Karl von Schönborn
Preceded by Anselm Franz von Ingelheim	Archbishop-Elector of Mainz; 1694-1729	Succeeded by Francis Louis of Palatinate-Neuburg
