= Pommersfelden =

- Municipality
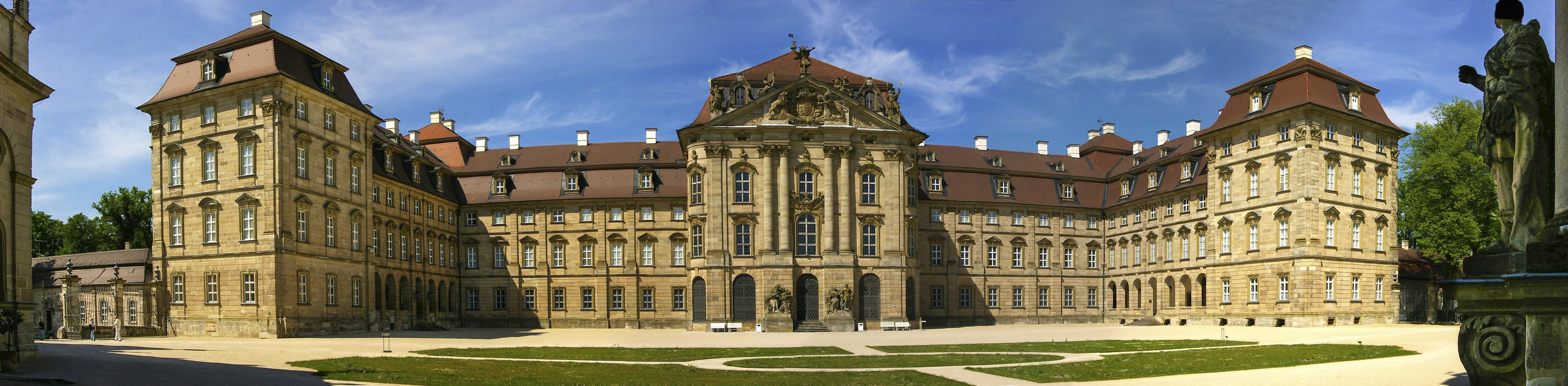
- Weißenstein Palace

- Coat of arms

- Location of Pommersfelden within Bamberg district
- Interactive map of Pommersfelden
- Location within Germany Location within Bavaria
- Coordinates: 49°46′N 10°49′E
- Country: Germany
- State: Bavaria
- Admin. region: Oberfranken
- District: Bamberg
- Subdivisions: 10 Gemeindeteile

Government
  - Mayor (2020–26): Gerd Dallner

Area
  - Total: 35.71 km^{2} (13.79 sq mi)
- Elevation: 270 m (890 ft)

Population (2025-12-31)
  - Total: 3,101
  - Density: 86.84/km^{2} (224.9/sq mi)
- Time zone: UTC+01:00 (CET)
  - Summer (DST): UTC+02:00 (CEST)
- Postal codes: 96178
- Dialling codes: 09548, 09502
- Vehicle registration: BA
- Website: www.pommersfelden.de

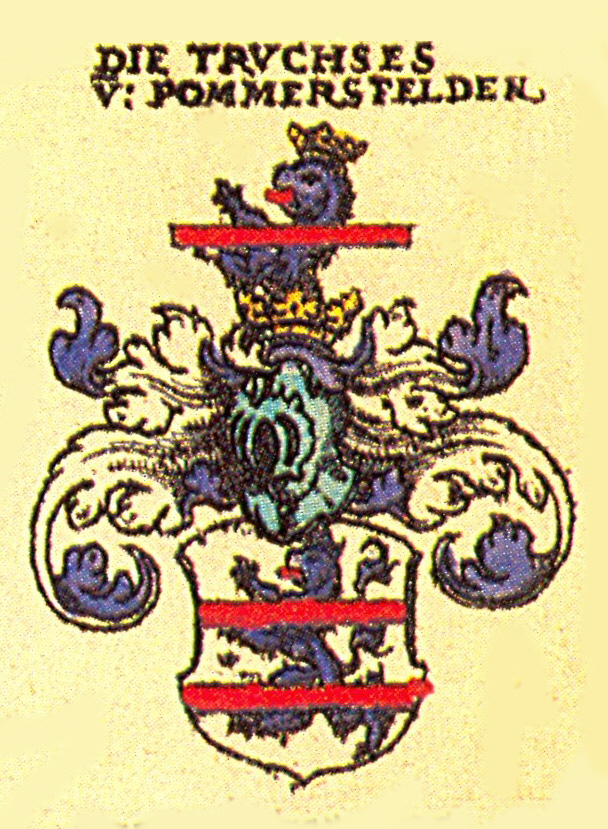
Truchseß von Pommersfelden family’s coat of arms

Pommersfelden is a municipality in the Upper Franconian district of Bamberg in Germany.

== Geography ==
The community lies north of Höchstadt an der Aisch on the river Reiche Ebrach.

=== Constituent communities ===
The community of Pommersfelden is subdivided into four Gemarkungen (traditional rural land units) with a total of ten settled centres, each given here with its own population figure:

- Gemarkung Oberndorf:

Oberndorf 89
Weiher (with Ziegelhütte) 102

- Gemarkung Pommersfelden:

Limbach 273
Pommersfelden 656

- Gemarkung Steppach:

Steppach 922
Stolzenroth 58
Unterköst 39

- Gemarkung Sambach:

Sambach 591
Schweinbach 133
Wind 62

The Gemarkungen have the same names as 4 of the constituent communities (it is traditional for a Gemarkung to be named after a town or village lying nearby, or in Pommersfelden’s case, within it).

== History ==
As of the 14th century, Pommersfelden was owned by the Truchseß von Nainsdorf und Pommersfelden family. After the family had died out in 1710, ownership passed to Lothar Franz von Schönborn, Elector of Mainz and Prince-Bishop of Bamberg. With the Act of the Confederation of the Rhine in 1806, the Counts of Schönborn saw their overlordship pass to Bavaria. In the course of administrative reform in Bavaria, today’s community came into being under the Gemeindeedikt (“Community Edict”) of 1818. Until 1972, Pommersfelden belonged to the district of Höchstadt an der Aisch.

=== Population development ===
Within municipal limits, 2,009 inhabitants were counted in 1970, 2,253 in 1987 and 2,653 in 2000. On 30 June 2007 it was 2,936.

== Politics ==
The mayor is Gerd Dallner, elected in 2020.

The community council is made up of 14 members, listed here by voter community affiliation, and also with the number of seats that each holds:

- Wählerblock Sambach: 5
- Freie Wählergemeinschaft Steppach: 5
- Bürgerblock Pommersfelden: 3
- Einigkeit Limbach: 1

=== Coat of arms ===
Pommersfelden’s arms might heraldically be described thus: Party per fess argent and gules, argent a pale azure, thereon an uppercase T argent and flanked by two embattled towers gules, gules a lion passant Or with two tails armed, langued and crowned azure on a mount of three.

In 1999, municipal tax revenue, converted to euros, amounted to €990,000 of which business taxes amounted to €174,000.

== Economy ==
=== Transport ===
Through the municipal area runs the Strullendorf–Schlüsselfeld railway line, although nowadays only goods are transported on it to and from Schlüsselfeld.

== Culture and sightseeing ==
=== Buildings ===
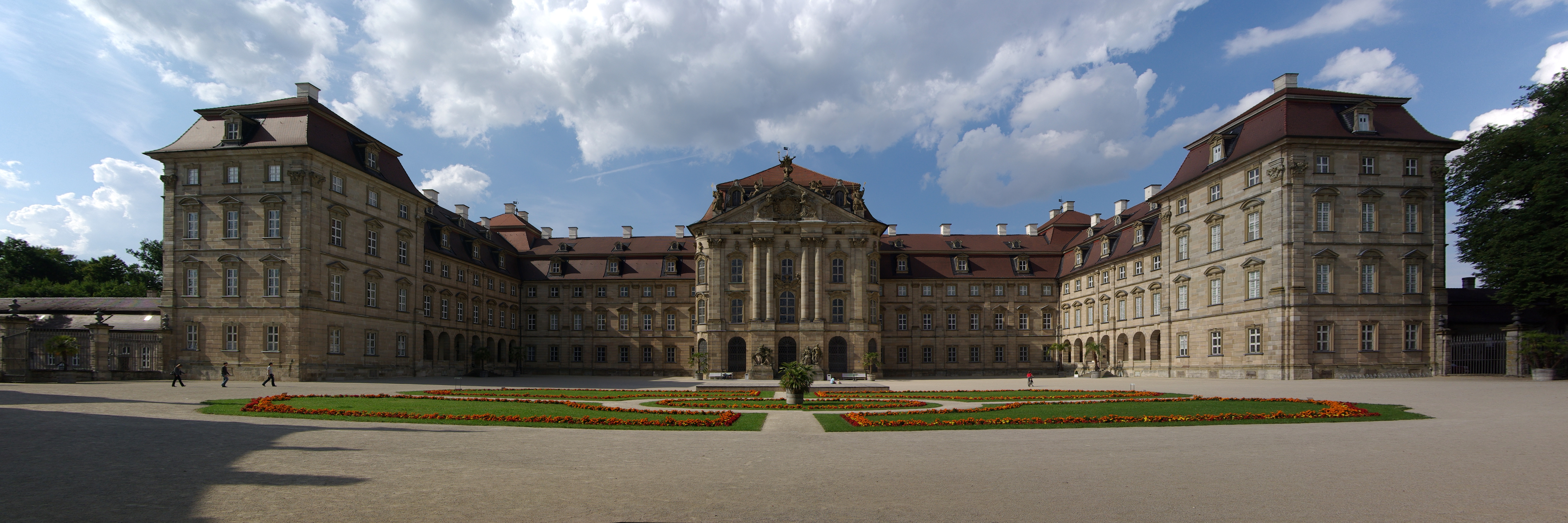
Schloss Weißenstein

In the south of the constituent community of Pommersfelden stands Schloss Weißenstein (palace), built by Lothar Franz von Schönborn between 1711 and 1716, which is nowadays in private family ownership. The Baroque palace houses an impressive stairway, an indoor grotto and a collection of paintings that is worth seeing.

In the middle of the constituent community of Pommersfelden are the remnants of an old castle with a moat, and in Sambach a Jesuit castle. Neither, however, is open to the public. Furthermore, the constituent communities of Limbach, Pommersfelden, Sambach, and Steppach each have a church.

=== Parks ===
Schloss Weißenstein has an English landscape park from the 19th century.

== Famous people ==
=== Sons and daughters of the town ===
The painter, restorer and gallery inspector Joseph Dorn was born on 12 August 1759 in Kratz-Sambach, today’s Sambach. From 1802 he was an inspector at the Schloss Weißenstein gallery. Dorn died on 6 August 1841.
