= Banz Abbey =

Cultural heritage monument in Bavaria, Germany

Coordinates: 50°07′58″N 11°00′03″E

- Kloster Banz
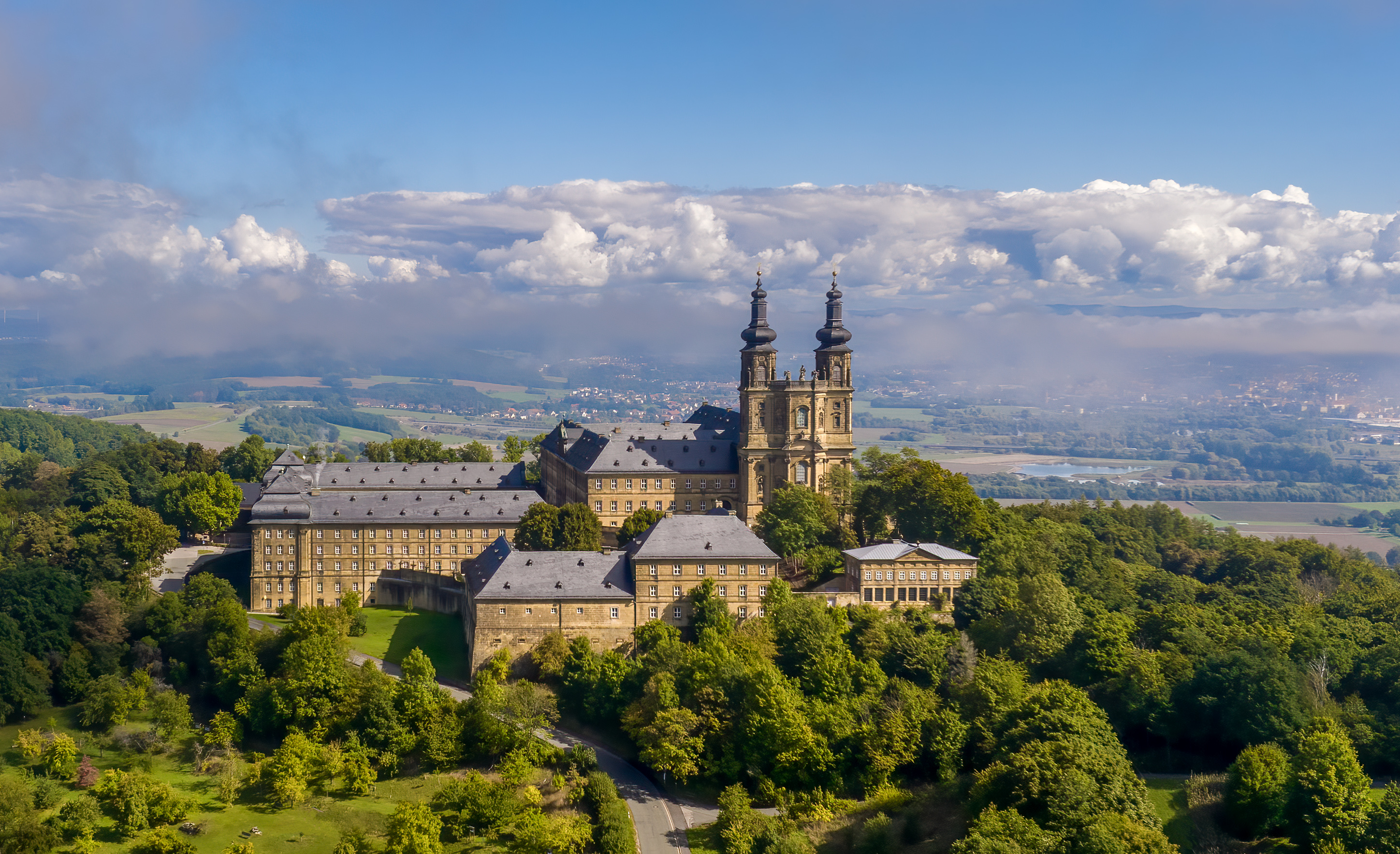
- Banz Abbey
- Interactive map of Banz Abbey

Monastery information
- Other name: Schloss Banz
- Order: Benedictine
- Established: ca. 1070
- Disestablished: 1803

Architecture
- Style: Baroque

Site
- Location: Bad Staffelstein, Germany

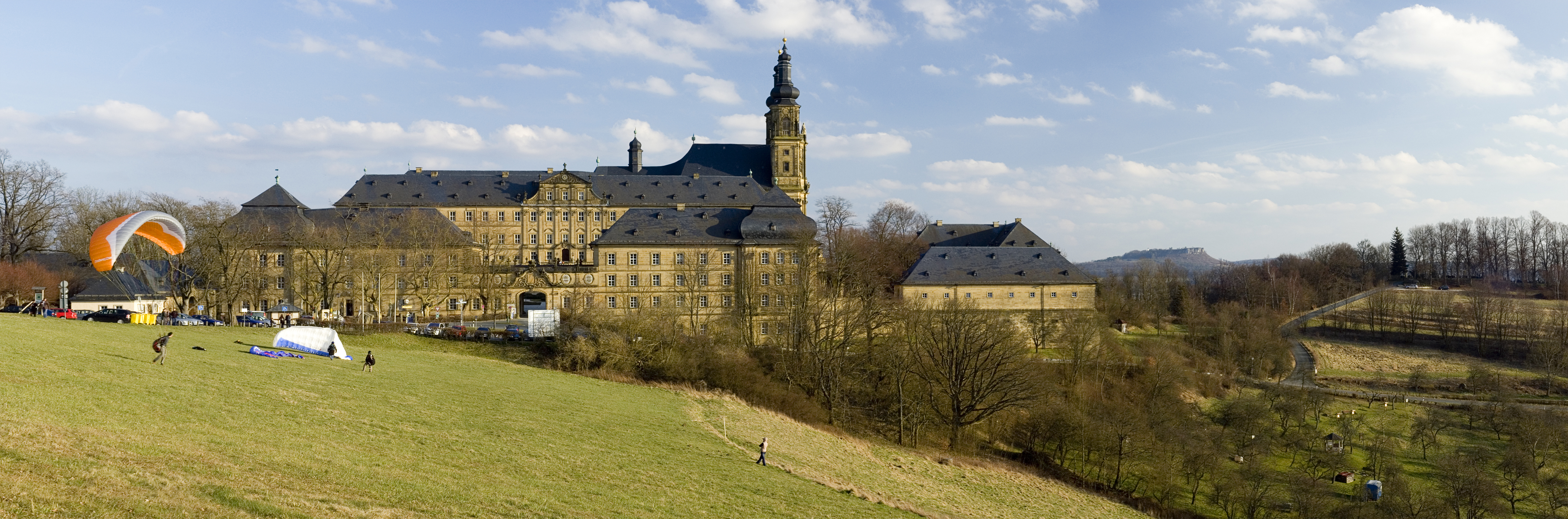
Banz Abbey

Banz Abbey (German: Kloster Banz), now known as Banz Castle (German: Schloss Banz), is a former Benedictine monastery, since 1978 a part of the town of Bad Staffelstein north of Bamberg, Bavaria, southern Germany.

== History ==
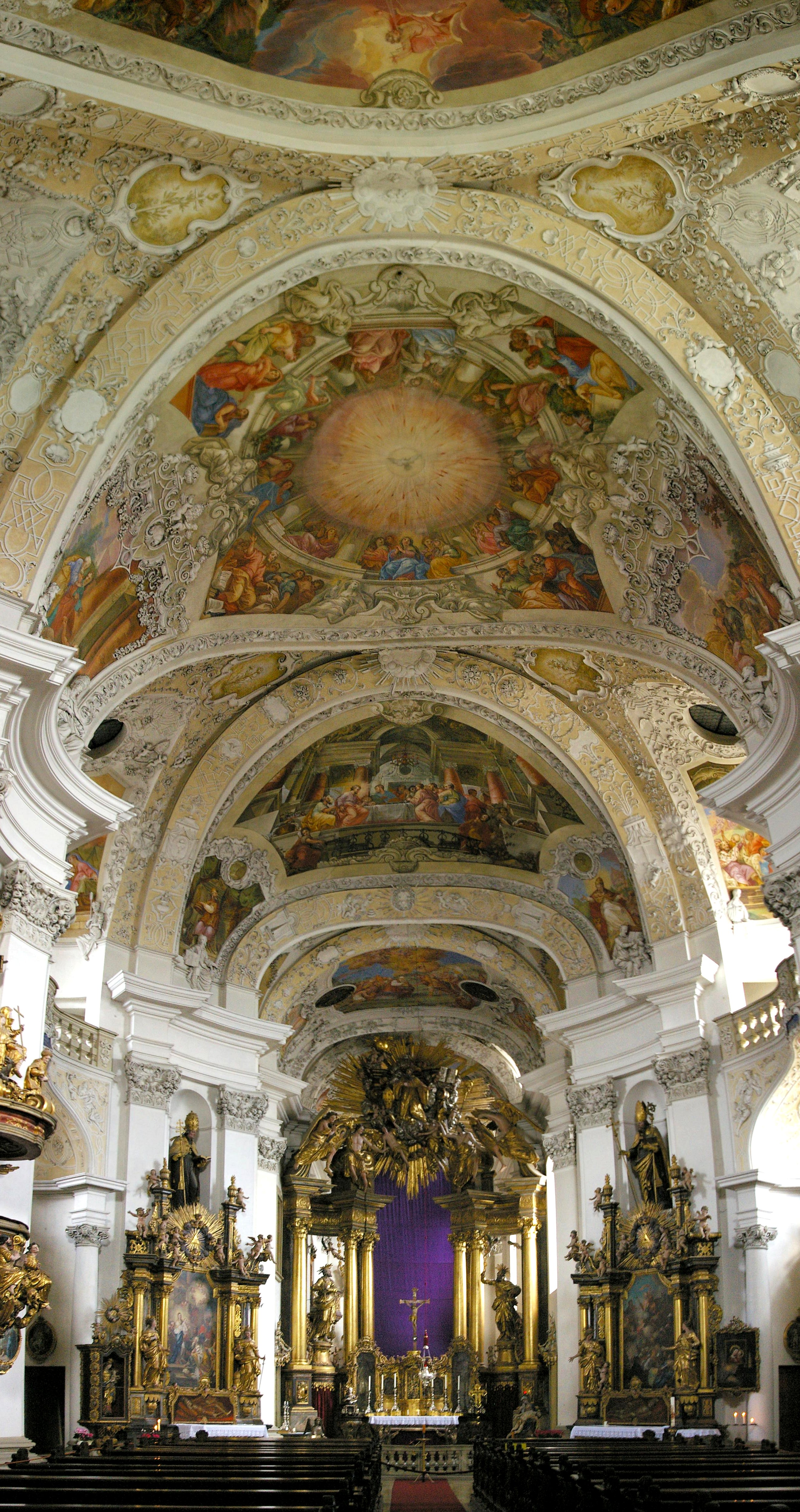
Church interior

The abbey was founded in about 1070 by Countess Alberada of Schweinfurt and her husband, Count Hermann of Habsburg-Kastl, and until the secularisation of 1803 was the oldest monastery on the upper Main.

In the late Middle Ages, and until 1575, only members of the nobility were accepted as monks.

After the Thirty Years' War, the abbey had to be rebuilt. The abbots Eucharius Weiner and Kilian Düring commissioned Johann Leonhard Dientzenhofer and after his death in 1707, his brother Johann Dientzenhofer. Construction began in 1698. The church, built in Baroque style, was consecrated in 1719. The interior is built, not with right angles, but with a series of ellipses. The main altar, the chancel and the statues of saints in the church and on the façade are by Balthasar Esterbauer; the ceiling frescoes are by Melchior Steidl. The choir stalls were made by the court cabinet maker and ebonist of Schönborn, Johann Georg Nesstfell.

In the second half of the 18th century, Banz Abbey was known throughout the Holy Roman Empire as a place of Catholic enlightenment and for the scholarship of its monks. This did not save it from secularisation and dissolution in 1803.

== After dissolution ==
In 1813, Duke Wilhelm in Bavaria acquired the former abbey premises, which were thereafter known as Schloss Banz ("Banz Castle").

In 1933, Duke Ludwig Wilhelm in Bavaria sold the buildings to the Community of the Holy Angels ("Gemeinschaft von den heiligen Engeln"), an order dedicated to the spiritual care of expatriate Germans. Since 1978, the former monastery has been in the possession of the Hanns Seidel Foundation, an organisation closely associated with the political party CSU, and is used as a conference centre. It also accommodates a collection of fossils and other curiosities, such as Egyptian mummies.

The estate of the former monastery, including vast forests, is today owned by Duke Max Emanuel's eldest daughter Sophie, Hereditary Princess of Liechtenstein.

== See also ==
- Valentin Rathgeber
- 18th-century Western domes

== Sources ==
- Dippold, G., 1991. Kloster Banz. Natur, Kultur, Architektur. Staffelstein: Obermain Buch- und Bildverlag.
- Wüst, W., 2001. Kloster Banz als ein benediktinisches Modell. Zur Stiftsstaatlichkeit in Franken. in: "Zeitschrift für bayerische Kirchengeschichte" 70 (2001), pp. 44–72.
- Stühlmeyer, B., Stühlmeyer, L., 2016. Johann Valentin Rathgeber. Leben und Werk. Verlag Sankt Michaelsbund, München 2016, ISBN 978-3-943135-78-7.
