= List of Guggenheim Fellowships awarded in 1975 =

Three hundred and eight scholars, artists, and scientists received Guggenheim Fellowships in 1975. $4,138,000 was disbursed between the recipients, who were chosen from an applicant pool of 2,819. Of the 88 universities represented, University of California, Berkeley had the most winners on its faculty (15), with Harvard University and Stanford University (14) tied for second, and University of California, Los Angeles and Columbia University (10) tied for third.

== 1975 U.S. and Canadian Fellows ==
| Category | Field of Study | Fellow | Institutional association | Research topic | Notes | Ref |
|---|---|---|---|---|---|---|
| Creative Arts | Choreography | Trisha Brown | Trisha Brown Dance Company | Choreography | Also won in 1984 | |
| Creative Arts | Choreography | Martha Clarke | | Choreography | Also won in 1988 | |
| Creative Arts | Drama and Performance Art | Richard Foreman | Ontological-Hysteric Theater | Playwriting | | |
| Creative Arts | Drama and Performance Art | Albert F. Innaurato | | Playwriting | | |
| Creative Arts | Drama and Performance Art | Philip Magdalany | | Playwriting | | |
| Creative Arts | Drama and Performance Art | Jeffrey George Weiss | The Good Medicine and Company | Playwriting | | |
| Creative Arts | Drama and Performance Art | George Malko | | Playwriting | | |
| Creative Arts | Drama and Performance Art | Robert Milton Young | | Alambrista! (1977) | | |
| Creative Arts | Fiction | Edward Abbey | | Writing | | |
| Creative Arts | Fiction | L. J. Davis | | Writing | | |
| Creative Arts | Fiction | Ronald L. Fair | | Writing | | |
| Creative Arts | Fiction | Gail Godwin | | Writing | | |
| Creative Arts | Fiction | Edward Hoagland | Bennington College | Writing | Also won in 1964 | |
| Creative Arts | Fiction | Tillie Olsen | | Writing | | |
| Creative Arts | Fiction | Ishmael Reed | University of California, Berkeley | Writing | | |
| Creative Arts | Fiction | Jack Salamanca | University of Maryland, College Park | Writing | | |
| Creative Arts | Fiction | Susan Sontag | | Writing | Also won in 1966 | |
| Creative Arts | Fiction | Joy Williams | | The Changeling (published 1976) | | |
| Creative Arts | Film | Peter Campus | | | | |
| Creative Arts | Film | Frank Mouris | | | | |
| Creative Arts | Film | Jorge R. Preloran | | Filming in Argentina | Also won in 1971 | |
| Creative Arts | Fine Arts | Guy I. Anderson | | Travels in Europe | | |
| Creative Arts | Fine Arts | Jeffery Francis Beardsall | | Graphics | | |
| Creative Arts | Fine Arts | Lynda Benglis | | Sculpture | | |
| Creative Arts | Fine Arts | Billy Al Bengston | | Painting | | |
| Creative Arts | Fine Arts | Natvar Bhavsar | | Painting | | |
| Creative Arts | Fine Arts | Stanley Boxer | | Painting | | |
| Creative Arts | Fine Arts | Fritz Bultman | | Sculpture | | |
| Creative Arts | Fine Arts | Bruce Conner | | Drawing and painting | | |
| Creative Arts | Fine Arts | Mel Edwards | Rutgers University | Sculpture | | |
| Creative Arts | Fine Arts | Jackie Ferrara | | Sculpture | | |
| Creative Arts | Fine Arts | Peter Gourfain | | Sculpture | | |
| Creative Arts | Fine Arts | Aristodimos Kaldis | | American landscape paintings | Also won in 1977 | |
| Creative Arts | Fine Arts | Michael Lekakis | | Sculpture | | |
| Creative Arts | Fine Arts | Norman Wilfred Lewis | Art Students League of New York | Painting | | |
| Creative Arts | Fine Arts | Clement Lyon Meadmore | | Sculpture | | |
| Creative Arts | Fine Arts | David Rabinowitch | | Sculpture | | |
| Creative Arts | Fine Arts | Michelle Stuart | | Drawing | | |
| Creative Arts | Fine Arts | Marvin Torffield | | Phonic sculpture | | |
| Creative Arts | Music Composition | Claus Adam | Juilliard School and Mannes College | Composing | | |
| Creative Arts | Music Composition | Arthur Victor Berger | Brandeis University | Composing | | |
| Creative Arts | Music Composition | Charles M. Dodge | Columbia University | "Electronic realization of Samuel Beckett's radio play Cascando and an electronic opera for radio, utilizing synthetic speech based on Mark Strand's The Story of Our Lives" | Also won in 1972 | |
| Creative Arts | Music Composition | Pril Smiley | Columbia-Princeton Electronic Music Center | Composing | | |
| Creative Arts | Music Composition | Morton Subotnick | California Institute of the Arts | Writings about electronic composition | | |
| Creative Arts | Photography | Paul Caponigro | | Ireland's ancient monuments | Also won in 1966 | |
| Creative Arts | Photography | Paul Diamond | California College of Arts and Crafts | | | |
| Creative Arts | Photography | William A. Garnett | University of California, Berkeley | Aerial photography | Also won in 1953, 1956 | |
| Creative Arts | Photography | Laura Gilpin | | Hand-coated platinum prints | | |
| Creative Arts | Photography | Frank William Gohlke | | Grain elevators | Also won in 1984 | |
| Creative Arts | Photography | Robert Heinecken | University of California, Los Angeles | | | |
| Creative Arts | Photography | Leon Levinstein | | "the American scene" | | |
| Creative Arts | Photography | Stephen Shore | | | | |
| Creative Arts | Poetry | Marvin Bell | University of Iowa | Writing | | |
| Creative Arts | Poetry | Peter Everwine | California State University, Fresno | Writing | | |
| Creative Arts | Poetry | Louise Glück | University of Virginia (visiting) | Writing | Also won in 1987 | |
| Creative Arts | Poetry | William Meredith | Connecticut College | Writing | | |
| Creative Arts | Poetry | Pelorhankhe Ai L'heah Ogawa | | Writing | | |
| Creative Arts | Poetry | Ruth Stone | | Writing | Also won in 1971 | |
| Creative Arts | Poetry | Charles Penzel Wright Jr. | University of California, Irvine | Writing | | |
| Creative Arts | Video & Audio | William George Wegman | | Painting on photographs | Also won in 1987 | |
| Humanities | American Literature | Nina Baym | University of Illinois, Urbana-Champaign | Fiction by and about women in America, 1820-1865 | | |
| Humanities | American Literature | Edwin H. Cady | Duke University | College sports and American life | Also won in 1954 | |
| Humanities | American Literature | Josephine Gattuso Hendin | New School for Social Research | Modern fiction | | |
| Humanities | American Literature | Justin Kaplan | | Walt Whitman biography (published 1980) | | |
| Humanities | American Literature | Joseph N. Frank | Princeton University | Critical biography of Dostoevsky | Also won in 1955 | |
| Humanities | American Literature | R. W. B. Lewis | Yale University | Aspects and influence of Tuscan culture | Also won in 1966 | |
| Humanities | American Literature | Roy Harvey Pearce | University of California, San Diego | 19th-century American literature and cultural history | | |
| Humanities | American Literature | Joseph Neill Riddel | University of California, Los Angeles | American poetics, from Poe to postmodernism | | |
| Humanities | American Literature | Linda C. Wagner | Michigan State University | | | |
| Humanities | Architecture, Planning, and Design | Joseph H. Aronson | | Italian urban design | | |
| Humanities | Architecture, Planning, and Design | Wayne Begley | University of Iowa | Mughal architecture of the 15th and 17th centuries | | |
| Humanities | Architecture, Planning, and Design | Norma Evenson | University of California, Berkeley | Development of Paris since the time of Haussmann | | |
| Humanities | Architecture, Planning, and Design | Kenneth Frampton | Columbia University | Le Corbusier and the evolution of the purist sensibility, 1898-1928 | | |
| Humanities | Architecture, Planning, and Design | Bernard J. Frieden | Massachusetts Institute of Technology | National housing policy, 1975-1976 | | |
| Humanities | Architecture, Planning, and Design | John Friedmann | University of California, Los Angeles | Background and analysis of public policy for increasing employment and income in third-world cities | | |
| Humanities | Architecture, Planning, and Design | José J. Villamil | Universidad de Puerto Rico | Development issues in small economies | | |
| Humanities | Biography | Douglas T. Day III | University of Virginia | Frederico Garcia Lorca | | |
| Humanities | Biography | Susan Sheehan | | | | |
| Humanities | British History | Sheila Biddle | Columbia University | Mobility and social status in late 197th and 18th century England | | |
| Humanities | British History | Brian P. Levack | University of Texas | | | |
| Humanities | Classics | John H. D'Arms | University of Michigan | Social and economic study of Roman port cities | | |
| Humanities | Classics | Steven Lattimore | University of California, Los Angeles | | | |
| Humanities | Classics | Helen Florence North | Swarthmore College | | Also won in 1958 | |
| Humanities | Classics | Dana F. Sutton | University of Illinois Urbana-Champaign | | | |
| Humanities | Classics | Leonardo Tarán | Columbia University | Evolution of the fragments of Spensippus | | |
| Humanities | East Asian Studies | Ray Huang | State University of New York | Ming dynasty | | |
| Humanities | East Asian Studies | Peter H. Lee | University of Hawaii | Rhetorical structure of East Asian poetry and how it compares with forms of Western poetry | | |
| Humanities | East Asian Studies | Masao Miyoshi | University of California, Berkeley | Japanese travelers' factual and fictional foreign experiences | Also won in 1970 | |
| Humanities | Economic History | Paul A. David | Stanford University | | | |
| Humanities | English Literature | Richard D. Altick | Ohio State University | Cultural and social history of the shows of London | | |
| Humanities | English Literature | Malcolm J. Brown | University of Washington | | | |
| Humanities | English Literature | John Clubbe | Duke University | Byron's "Swiss period" (summer 1816), when he penned many of his romantic poems that reflected his mid-career personal crisis | | |
| Humanities | English Literature | A. Dwight Culler | Yale University | Intellectual background of English literature in the Victorian period | Also won in 1961 | |
| Humanities | English Literature | Leo Damrosch | University of Virginia | Relationship of literature and historical process in an age of political revolutions | | |
| Humanities | English Literature | Paul Delany | Simon Fraser University | | | |
| Humanities | English Literature | Park Honan | | | Also won in 1962 | |
| Humanities | English Literature | Arthur F. Marotti | Wayne State University | | | |
| Humanities | English Literature | Jerome McGann | Johns Hopkins University | | Also won in 1970 | |
| Humanities | English Literature | Harold E. Toliver | | | Also won in 1964 | |
| Humanities | Fine Arts Research | Bruce Cole | Indiana University | Origin and early development of Florentine painting | | |
| Humanities | Fine Arts Research | Sidney Geist | Vassar College (visiting) | Sculpture of Constantin Brâncuși | | |
| Humanities | Fine Arts Research | Ellen H. Johnson | Oberlin College | Problems of old age and the contemporary artist | | |
| Humanities | Fine Arts Research | Margit Rowell | | Art of František Kupka | | |
| Humanities | Fine Arts Research | Kathleen Weil-Garris | New York University | Baccio Bandinelli and the art of his time | Applied as Posner, Kathleen Weil-Garris | |
| Humanities | Folklore and Popular Culture | Dan Ben-Amos | University of Pennsylvania | | | |
| Humanities | Folklore and Popular Culture | Roger E. Mitchell | University of Wisconsin, Eau Claire | Distribution of Micronesian folktale types and narrative motifs | | |
| Humanities | French History | John B. Henneman Jr | University of Iowa | French aristocracy of the late Middle Ages | | |
| Humanities | French History | Alan B. Spitzer | University of Iowa | French generation of the 1820s | | |
| Humanities | French Literature | Carol Blum | State University of New York | Rousseau's concept of virtue and the French Revolution | | |
| Humanities | French Literature | Philip Kolb | University of Illinois Urbana-Champaign | | | |
| Humanities | French Literature | Jan Miel | Wesleyan University | Pascal's Pensées and his scientific method | | |
| Humanities | German and East European History | Richard N. Hunt | | | | |
| Humanities | German and East European History | H. C. Erik Midelfort | University of Virginia | History of insanity in 16th-century Germany | | |
| Humanities | German and Scandinavian Literature | Alfred Anger | City University of New York | The rococo style of Goethe's Weimar period, 1775-1832 | | |
| Humanities | German and Scandinavian Literature | Ernst Behler | | | Also won in 1967 | |
| Humanities | German and Scandinavian Literature | David H. Miles | Ohio State University | Metapolitics and the radical imagination in Lukacs and Marcuse | | |
| Humanities | General Nonfiction | Henry S. F. Cooper Jr. | The New Yorker | Scientific history of the Apollo program | | |
| Humanities | General Nonfiction | Anne Hollander | | Clothed figure in art and in fact | | |
| Humanities | General Nonfiction | Walter Karp | | Party poliitcs and American foreign wars, 1898-1965 | | |
| Humanities | General Nonfiction | Nora Sayre | | Concerns of three American generations | | |
| Humanities | General Nonfiction | William Wertenbaker | | Origins of man | | |
| Humanities | History of Science & Technology | John Emery Murdoch | Harvard University | | | |
| Humanities | History of Science & Technology | David Pingree | Brown University | | | |
| Humanities | Iberian & Latin American History | Kenneth R. Maxwell | University of Kansas | Caribbean slave unrest and the democratic revolutions of the late 18th century | | |
| Humanities | Iberian & Latin American History | Peter H. Smith | University of Wisconsin, Madison | | | |
| Humanities | Latin American Literature | Norman Thomas di Giovanni | | | | |
| Humanities | Latin American Literature | José C. Durand | University of Michigan | Edition of the first version of Garcilaso's La Florida del Inca | | |
| Humanities | Linguistics | Joan Wanda Bresnan | University of Massachusetts | Linguistic theory and structures in English | | |
| Humanities | Linguistics | Robin T. Lakoff | University of California, Berkeley | Relation between language form and language use | | |
| Humanities | Linguistics | Ilse Lehiste | Ohio State University | World and sentence rhyming of the Serbo-Croatian language | Also won in 1969 | |
| Humanities | Linguistics | Sally McLendon | City University of New York | Syntax and semantics in an ergative language | | |
| Humanities | Literary Criticism | Matei A. Calinescu | Indiana University | Concepts and theories of modernity | | |
| Humanities | Literary Criticism | Edgardo Cozarinsky | | | Also won in 1968 | |
| Humanities | Literary Criticism | Harriett Bloker Hawkins | Vassar College | Tragic and satiric studies in the art of the insoluble | | |
| Humanities | Literary Criticism | Robert B. Heilman | University of Washington | | Also won in 1964 | |
| Humanities | Literary Criticism | Edith Kern | Smith College | Alienation and literary form | | |
| Humanities | Literary Criticism | Lionel Trilling | Columbia University | Crucial aspects of American intellectual culture in the present century | Also won in 1947 | |
| Humanities | Medieval History | Richard H. Rouse | University of California, Los Angeles | | | |
| Humanities | Medieval Literature | David C. Fowler | University of Washington | Research at Oxford University | Also won in 1961 | |
| Humanities | Music Research | Richard J. Colwell | University of Illinois Urbana-Champaign | | | |
| Humanities | Music Research | Frederick Neumann | University of Richmond | Ornamentation in the music of Mozart | Also won in 1967 | |
| Humanities | Music Research | Kurt Stone | Joseph Boonin, Inc. | Book: Music Notation in the Twentieth Century: A Practical Guidebook (published 1980) | | |
| Humanities | Music Research | Eugene K. Wolf | University of Pennsylvania | Early Mannheim symphony | | |
| Humanities | Near Eastern Studies | Richard Williams Bulliet | University of California, Berkeley | Rate impact of Islamic convention in the Middle Ages | | |
| Humanities | Near Eastern Studies | Richard N. Frye | | | Also won in 1951 | |
| Humanities | Near Eastern Studies | Baruch A. Levine | New York University | Terminology and meaning in Biblical religion | | |
| Humanities | Philosophy | Nuel D. Belnap | University of Pittsburgh | Entailment: The Logic of Relevance and Necessity (published 1975) | | |
| Humanities | Philosophy | Alan Gewirth | University of Chicago | | | |
| Humanities | Philosophy | Alvin I. Goldman | University of Michigan | Knowledge and thought | | |
| Humanities | Philosophy | John Richard Perry | Stanford University | | | |
| Humanities | Philosophy | John R. Searle | University of California, Berkeley | Philosophical and linguistic study of the uses of language | | |
| Humanities | Philosophy | Stephen E. Toulmin | University of Chicago | | | |
| Humanities | Photography Studies | Beaumont Newhall | University of New Mexico (visiting) | Fifth edition of History of Photography | Also won in 1947 | |
| Humanities | Religion | Don S. Browning | University of Chicago | | | |
| Humanities | Religion | E. Earle Ellis | New Brunswick Theological Seminary | Commentary on St. Paul's Corinthians | | |
| Humanities | Renaissance History | Virginia Brown | Pontifical Institute of Mediaeval Studies | | | |
| Humanities | Renaissance History | John William O'Malley | University of Detroit | Roman Catholic Church and reform | | |
| Humanities | Slavic Literature | Milton Ehre | University of Chicago | | | |
| Humanities | Slavic Literature | Donald Fanger | Harvard University | | | |
| Humanities | Slavic Literature | Mirra Ginsburg | | Translation and study of certain works of Aleksey Remizov | | |
| Humanities | Spanish and Portuguese Literature | Ruth El Saffar | University of Illinois, Chicago | Textual and comparative studies of Spanish fiction of the Golden Age | | |
| Humanities | Spanish and Portuguese Literature | Michael P. Predmore | University of Washington | | | |
| Humanities | Theatre Arts | Augusto Boal | | | Also won in 1973 | |
| Humanities | Theatre Arts | Joseph Chaikin | | Traditions of storytelling as models for the contemporary theater | Also won in 1970 | |
| Humanities | Theatre Arts | Harold Clurman | City University of New York | Ibsen's plays | Also won in 1979 | |
| Humanities | Theatre Arts | Richard Schechner | New York University | Traditional performance in Asian theater and experimental forms in America | | |
| Humanities | United States History | Timothy Hall Breen | Northwestern University | | | |
| Humanities | United States History | John D. Buenker | University of Wisconsin, Parkside | Dynamics of reform in the Progressive Era | | |
| Humanities | United States History | John P. Diggins | University of California, Irvine | | | |
| Humanities | United States History | Eric Foner | City University of New York | Radicalism and American society, 1776-1900 | | |
| Humanities | United States History | David M. Kennedy | Stanford University | | | |
| Humanities | United States History | Aileen S. Kraditor | Boston University | | | |
| Humanities | United States History | William E. Leuchtenburg | Columbia University | Franklin D. Roosevelt and the Supreme Court crisis | | |
| Humanities | United States History | Robert A. McCaughey | Columbia University | First generation of American-trained PhDs | | |
| Humanities | United States History | William M. Tuttle Jr. | University of Kansas | | | |
| Humanities | United States History | Peter H. Wood | Harvard University | | | |
| Natural Sciences | Applied Mathematics | Toby Berger | Cornell University | Ergodic theory and information theory | | |
| Natural Sciences | Applied Mathematics | Joseph P. LaSalle | Brown University | Stability of dynamical systems | | |
| Natural Sciences | Applied Mathematics | E. H. Lee | Stanford University | Aspects of plasticity | | |
| Natural Sciences | Applied Mathematics | Frederick Milstein | University of California, Santa Barbara | | | |
| Natural Sciences | Astronomy and Astrophysics | William A. Coles | University of California, San Diego | Research at CSIRO and Cavendish Laboratory | | |
| Natural Sciences | Astronomy and Astrophysics | James Richard Houck | Cornell University | Infrared astronomy | | |
| Natural Sciences | Astronomy and Astrophysics | Richard Alan McCray | University of Colorado Boulder | | | |
| Natural Sciences | Astronomy and Astrophysics | Joseph Silk | University of California, Berkeley | Theoretical astrophysics and cosmology | | |
| Natural Sciences | Chemistry | Stephen James Benkovic | Pennsylvania State University | | | |
| Natural Sciences | Chemistry | David A. Brant | University of California, Irvine | | | |
| Natural Sciences | Chemistry | Marjorie C. Caserio | University of California, Irvine | | | |
| Natural Sciences | Chemistry | James L. Dye | Michigan State University | Research in Strasbourg | Also won in 1990 | |
| Natural Sciences | Chemistry | Ernest L. Eliel | University of North Carolina at Chapel Hill | Stereochemistry | Also won in 1983 | |
| Natural Sciences | Chemistry | William C. Gardiner Jr. | University of Texas | | | |
| Natural Sciences | Chemistry | Ernest Grunwald | Brandeis University | | | |
| Natural Sciences | Chemistry | Emil Thomas Kaiser | University of Chicago | | | |
| Natural Sciences | Chemistry | Gerd N. La Mar | University of California, Davis | | | |
| Natural Sciences | Chemistry | Donald H. Levy | University of Chicago | | | |
| Natural Sciences | Chemistry | Donald A. McQuarrie | Indiana University | Electrical and transport properties of membranes | | |
| Natural Sciences | Chemistry | William H. Miller | University of California, Berkeley | Theoretical chemistry | | |
| Natural Sciences | Chemistry | Teddy G. Traylor | University of California, San Diego | | | |
| Natural Sciences | Chemistry | Kenneth L. Williamson | Mount Holyoke College | Organic chemistry | | |
| Natural Sciences | Chemistry | Andrew Wojcicki | Ohio State University | Organometallic chemistry | | |
| Natural Sciences | Computer Science | Raj Reddy | Carnegie Mellon University | Functionally specialized computer architectures for speech and vision problems | | |
| Natural Sciences | Earth Science | Paul J. Coleman, Jr. | University of California, Los Angeles | | | |
| Natural Sciences | Earth Science | W. G. Ernst | University of California, Los Angeles | | | |
| Natural Sciences | Earth Science | Stanley Martin Flatté | University of California, Santa Cruz | Internal movement of the ocean | | |
| Natural Sciences | Earth Science | Heinrich D. Holland | Harvard University | | | |
| Natural Sciences | Earth Science | David J. Hooson | University of California, Berkeley | Role of national culture in the development of Russian and British geographical thought, 1885-1915 | | |
| Natural Sciences | Earth Science | Bruce Murray | California Institute of Technology | Comparative planetology of the Earth-like planets: Earth, Mars, Moon, Venus, and Mercury | | |
| Natural Sciences | Engineering | Neal R. Amundson | University of Minneapolis | Chemical engineering and materials science | Also won in 1954 | |
| Natural Sciences | Engineering | Robert Kaul Finn | Cornell University | Microbial engineering | | |
| Natural Sciences | Engineering | Wilson H. Tang | University of Illinois at Urbana-Champaign | | | |
| Natural Sciences | Mathematics | Kai Lai Chung | Stanford University | Probability methods in potential theory | | |
| Natural Sciences | Mathematics | Bernard M. Dwork | Princeton University | Differential equations | Also won in 1964 | |
| Natural Sciences | Mathematics | Herbert Federer | Brown University | Geometric measure theory | | |
| Natural Sciences | Mathematics | Wu-Chung Hsiang | Princeton University | Topology | | |
| Natural Sciences | Mathematics | Nicholas M. Katz | Princeton University | Algebraic geometry | Also won in 1987 | |
| Natural Sciences | Mathematics | Masatake Kuranishi | Columbia University | Complex analysis | | |
| Natural Sciences | Mathematics | Louis Nirenberg | New York University | Partial differential equations | Also won in 1966 | |
| Natural Sciences | Mathematics | Isadore M. Singer | Massachusetts Institute of Technology | Geometric and spectral invariants | Also won in 1968 | |
| Natural Sciences | Medicine & Health | Stanley N. Cohen | Stanford University | | | |
| Natural Sciences | Medicine & Health | Rose E. Frisch | Harvard University | Adipose tissue | | |
| Natural Sciences | Medicine & Health | Robert T. Schimke | Stanford University | | | |
| Natural Sciences | Medicine & Health | Hamilton O. Smith | Johns Hopkins University | Histone gene arrangement and sequence | | |
| Natural Sciences | Medicine & Health | Claud Kern Wildenthal | University of Texas Southwestern Medical School | Cardiac physiology | | |
| Natural Sciences | Molecular & Cellular Biology | Konrad Bloch | Harvard University | | Also won in 1953 and 1960 | |
| Natural Sciences | Molecular & Cellular Biology | William F. Dove | University of Wisconsin, Madison | Experimental studies in developmental genetics | | |
| Natural Sciences | Molecular & Cellular Biology | Robert P. Erickson | University of California, San Francisco | | | |
| Natural Sciences | Molecular & Cellular Biology | Leon A. Heppel | Cornell University | Cell biology | Also won in 1953 | |
| Natural Sciences | Molecular & Cellular Biology | John Grissim Pierce | University of California, Los Angeles | Research at the NIH | Also won in 1960 | |
| Natural Sciences | Molecular & Cellular Biology | Franklin W. Stahl | University of Oregon | Advanced text in genetics | Also won in 1985 | |
| Natural Sciences | Molecular & Cellular Biology | Muttaiya Sundaralingam | University of Wisconsin, Madison | Research at Oxford University | | |
| Natural Sciences | Molecular & Cellular Biology | Robert L. Switzer | University of Illinois, Urbana-Champaign | Regulation of microbial metabolism | | |
| Natural Sciences | Molecular & Cellular Biology | Lewis G. Tilney | University of Pennsylvania | | | |
| Natural Sciences | Molecular & Cellular Biology | Fred Huffman Wilt | University of California, Berkeley | Embryology and developmental biology | | |
| Natural Sciences | Molecular & Cellular Biology | Ralph Stoner Wolfe | University of Illinois Urbana-Champaign | | Also won in 1960 | |
| Natural Sciences | Molecular & Cellular Biology | William Barry Wood | University of Colorado Boulder | | | |
| Natural Sciences | Neuroscience | Allen I. Selverston | University of California, San Diego | | | |
| Natural Sciences | Neuroscience | Norman Keith Wessells | Stanford University | | | |
| Natural Sciences | Organismic Biology & Ecology | Robert R. Sokal | State University of New York | Population biology and statistical geography | Also won in 1983 | |
| Natural Sciences | Organismic Biology & Ecology | George F. Oster | Stanford University | Population biology | | |
| Natural Sciences | Organismic Biology & Ecology | John Palka | University of Washington | | | |
| Natural Sciences | Organismic Biology & Ecology | Geerat J. Vermeij | University of Maryland, College Park | Nature and evolution of tropical marine mollusks | | |
| Natural Sciences | Organismic Biology & Ecology | Edward O. Wilson | Harvard University | | | |
| Natural Sciences | Physics | Richard Lewis Arnowitt | Northeastern University | | | |
| Natural Sciences | Physics | James W. Corbett | State University of New York at Albany | Solid-state physics | | |
| Natural Sciences | Physics | Bryce S. DeWitt | University of Texas | Research at All Souls College, Oxford | | |
| Natural Sciences | Physics | Abraham Klein | University of Pennsylvania | | | |
| Natural Sciences | Physics | Philip Alan Pincus | University of California, Los Angeles | Research at Orsay | | |
| Natural Sciences | Physics | Robert C. Richardson | Cornell University | Low temperature physics | Also won in 1982 | |
| Natural Sciences | Physics | Jun John Sakurai | University of California, Los Angeles | | | |
| Natural Sciences | Physics | Gino Segrè | University of Pennsylvania | | | |
| Natural Sciences | Physics | Lawrence Wilets | University of Washington | | | |
| Natural Sciences | Plant Sciences | Wayne Marvin Becker | University of Wisconsin, Madison | Developmental biochemistry of seed germination | | |
| Natural Sciences | Plant Sciences | Leslie David Gottlieb | University of California, Davis | | | |
| Natural Sciences | Plant Sciences | Donald A. Levin | University of Texas | | | |
| Natural Sciences | Plant Sciences | Tommy L. Phillips | University of Illinois at Urbana-Champaign | Research in France and the Soviet Union | | |
| Natural Sciences | Plant Sciences | Otto Thomas Solbrig | Harvard University | | | |
| Natural Sciences | Statistics | David Ross Brillinger | University of California, Berkeley | Theory and applications of point process | Also won in 1982 | |
| Natural Sciences | Statistics | Herbert Robbins | Columbia University | Mathematical statistics | Also won in 1952 | |
| Social Sciences | Anthropology & Cultural Studies | Glynn L. Isaac | University of California, Berkeley | Archaeological evidence relating to the origins of man | | |
| Social Sciences | Anthropology & Cultural Studies | Alfonso Ortiz | University of New Mexico | History of the stereotype of the American Indian in American popular culture | | |
| Social Sciences | Anthropology & Cultural Studies | Thayer Scudder | California Institute of Technology | | | |
| Social Sciences | Anthropology & Cultural Studies | Marc J. Swartz | University of California, San Diego | Research on the Swahili of Mombasa | | |
| Social Sciences | Economics | Takeshi Amemiya | Stanford University | Research at the London School of Economics | | |
| Social Sciences | Economics | George H. Borts | Brown University | | | |
| Social Sciences | Economics | Peter B. Kenen | Princeton University | Theory of international integration | | |
| Social Sciences | Economics | Stephen A. Marglin | Harvard University | | | |
| Social Sciences | Economics | Stephen A. Ross | University of Pennsylvania | | | |
| Social Sciences | Economics | A. Michael Spence | Stanford University | | | |
| Social Sciences | Economics | Harold Wesley Watts | University of Wisconsin, Madison | | | |
| Social Sciences | Geography & Environmental Studies | Bernard Q. Nietschmann | University of Michigan | Theory and method in cultural ecology | | |
| Social Sciences | Geography & Environmental Studies | Robert D. Sack | University of Wisconsin, Madison | Conceptions of space in contemporary social thought | | |
| Social Sciences | Law | Dante L. Germino | University of Virginia | Political theory and the idea of the open society | | |
| Social Sciences | Law | Abraham S. Goldstein | Yale University School of Law | Inquisitorial and accusatorial theory in comparative criminal procedure | Also won in 1964 | |
| Social Sciences | Law | Arthur Allen Leff | Yale University | Ethics, economics, and the law of fraud | | |
| Social Sciences | Political Science | John A. Armstrong Jr. | University of Wisconsin, Madison | "Ethnic interactions among multiethnic politics" | Also won in 1967 | |
| Social Sciences | Political Science | Robert Art | Brandeis University | | | |
| Social Sciences | Political Science | Reinhard Bendix | University of California, Berkeley | Sacred and secular foundations of sovereign authority | | |
| Social Sciences | Political Science | Allan David Bloom | University of Toronto | | | |
| Social Sciences | Political Science | Jonathan David Casper | Stanford University | | | |
| Social Sciences | Political Science | Philip E. Converse | University of Michigan | Political representation in France | | |
| Social Sciences | Political Science | Milton Curtis Cummings Jr. | Johns Hopkins University | | | |
| Social Sciences | Political Science | Charles V. Hamilton | Columbia University | Minority groups and urban political decision-making | | |
| Social Sciences | Political Science | Michael Craig Hudson | Georgetown University | Politics and development planning in selected countries in the Arab Middle East | | |
| Social Sciences | Political Science | George McTurnan Kahin | Cornell University | Effects of American intervention on the political character of the states of Southeast Asia | | |
| Social Sciences | Political Science | Martin Kilson | Harvard University | | | |
| Social Sciences | Political Science | Donna E. Shalala | Columbia University and Municipal Assistance Corporation | State revenue politics | | |
| Social Sciences | Political Science | Lloyd I. Rudolph | University of Chicago | | | |
| Social Sciences | Political Science | Paul M. Sniderman | Stanford University | | | |
| Social Sciences | Political Science | Michael Walzer | Harvard University | | | |
| Social Sciences | Psychology | Herbert H. Clark | Stanford University | | | |
| Social Sciences | Psychology | Robert Glaser | University of Pittsburgh | | | |
| Social Sciences | Psychology | Richard M. Shiffrin | Indiana University | Human information processing, including memory and forgetting | | |
| Social Sciences | Psychology | Bennett Simon | Harvard Medical School | | | |
| Social Sciences | Sociology | Aaron Cicourel | University of California, San Diego | Sephardic Jews and Hispanic culture | | |
| Social Sciences | Sociology | Jonathan R. Cole | Columbia University | Growth of scientific knowledge and scientific specialties | | |
| Social Sciences | Sociology | Lewis A. Coser | State University of New York | Sociological study of the publishing industry | | |
| Social Sciences | Sociology | Brian Erich Goode | State University of New York | Drug use as deviant behavior | | |
| Social Sciences | Sociology | Rosabeth Moss Kanter | Brandeis University | Impact of organizational work roles on families | | |
| Social Sciences | Sociology | Lewis M. Killian | University of Massachusetts Amherst | Race relations in Britain | | |
| Social Sciences | Sociology | Anthony Oberschall | Vanderbilt University | Resource management models in social transaction markets | | |
| Social Sciences | Sociology | Leon E. Seltzer | Stanford University Press | | | |
| Social Sciences | Sociology | James F. Short Jr. | Stanford University (visiting) | Roles of Indigenous youth groups in industrial societies | | |

== 1975 Latin American and Caribbean Fellows ==
| Category | Field of Study | Fellow | Institutional association | Research topic | Notes | Ref |
|---|---|---|---|---|---|---|
| Creative Arts | Fiction | Gustavo Sainz | Universidad Nacional Autónoma de México | Writing | | |
| Creative Arts | Fiction | Severo Sarduy | | Writing | | |
| Creative Arts | Film | Luc-Toni Kuhn Martin | | Filmmaking | | |
| Creative Arts | Fine Arts | Edgar Negret | | Sculpture | | |
| Creative Arts | Photography | Manuel Alvarez Bravo | | | | |
| Creative Arts | Poetry | Tomás Segovia | Colegio de México | Writing | Also won in 1967 | |
| Humanities | Fine Arts Research | Felipe Ehrenberg Enriquez | | Schizophrenic dualities present in Latin American art as a consequence of bilingualism | | |
| Humanities | Iberian & Latin American History | Germán Colmenares | University of Valle | Economic and social history of colonial Colombia | | |
| Humanities | Iberian & Latin American History | Ezequiel Luis Gallo | Torcuato di Tella Institute | Society and politics in Argentina, 1870-1916 | | |
| Humanities | Music Research | Samuel Claro-Valdes | Catholic University of Chile | Role of music in 16th- and 17th-century Latin American society | | |
| Humanities | Philosophy | Carlos Eduardo Alchourrón | University of Buenos Aires | | | |
| Humanities | Philosophy | Eugenio Bulygin | University of Buenos Aires | Philosophy of law | | |
| Humanities | Spanish & Portuguese Literature | Guillermo Araya | Université de Bordeaux III | | | |
| Natural Sciences | Astronomy & Astrophysics | Carlos B. Suárez | Universidad Nacional de La Plata and CONICET | | | |
| Natural Sciences | Earth Science | Mario Costa Barberena | Federal University of Rio Grande do Sul | | | |
| Natural Sciences | Mathematics | Aron Simis | Instituto Nacional de Matemática Pura e Aplicada | Algebraic geometry | | |
| Natural Sciences | Medicine & Health | Jaime Alberto Moguilevsky | University of Buenos Aires and CONICET | | | |
| Natural Sciences | Molecular & Cellular Biology | Catalina A. Rotunno | Centro de Investigaciones Médicas Albert Einstein and CONICET | Membrane physiology and transport phenomena | | |
| Natural Sciences | Molecular & Cellular Biology | Héctor N. Torres | University of Buenos Aires | | | |
| Natural Sciences | Physics | Sergio Machado Rezende | Federal University of Pernambuco | | | |
| Natural Sciences | Plant Sciences | Alvaro Fernández-Pérez | Universidad Nacional de Colombia | Herbarium studies | Also won in 1957 | |
| Natural Sciences | Plant Sciences | Ivany F. M. Válio | State University of Campinas | | | |
| Social Sciences | Anthropology and Cultural Studies | Alberto Juajibioy Chindoy | University of Antioquia | Ethnographic and linguistic studies of the Kamëntšá people of Colombia | | |
| Social Sciences | Anthropology and Cultural Studies | Lorena Mirambell | Instituto Nacional de Antropología e Historia | Technological and morphological studies of prehistoric lithic implements | | |
| Social Sciences | Economics | Ana Maria Martirena-Mantel | University of Buenos Aires and Torcuato di Tella Institute | Limited flexibility of exchange rates | | |
| Social Sciences | Law | Enrique Bacigalupo | University of Bonn | Theoretical basis for reform of penal codes | | |
| Social Sciences | Sociology | Domingo M. Rivarola | Paraguayan Center for Sociological Studies | Demographic studies of rural Paraguay | | |

== See also ==
- Guggenheim Fellowship
- List of Guggenheim Fellowships awarded in 1974
- List of Guggenheim Fellowships awarded in 1976
