= List of Guggenheim Fellowships awarded in 1976 =

Three hundred artists, and scientists received Guggenheim Fellowships in 1976. $4,192,000 was disbursed between the recipient, who were chosen from an applicant pool of 2,953. University of California, Berkeley had the most winners on its faculty (21), with Stanford University (18) coming second, and Harvard University (11) coming third. The University of California system had 42 fellowships total among its faculty.

== 1976 United States and Canadian fellows ==
Category	Field of Study	Fellow	Institutional association	Research topic	Notes	Ref
Creative Arts	Drama & Performance Art	Ed Bullins			Also won in 1971	
Creative Arts	Drama & Performance Art	Lorees Yerby		Play trilogy Our Fathers		
Creative Arts	Choreography	Laura Dean	Laura Dean Dancers and Musicians		Also won in 1981	
Creative Arts	Choreography	Bill Evans	University of Utah	Choreographing several new works and revising previous works		
Creative Arts	Choreography	Nancy Meehan	Nancy Meehan Dance Company			
Creative Arts	Fiction	Russell Banks	University of New Hampshire at Durham	Hamilton Stark (published 1978)		
Creative Arts	Fiction	Rosellen Brown		Writing		
Creative Arts	Fiction	Edward Dahlberg		Writing		
Creative Arts	Fiction	Andre Dubus	Bradford College	Writing	Also won in 1986	
Creative Arts	Fiction	John Clellon Holmes		Writing		
Creative Arts	Fiction	John Irving	Mount Holyoke College	Writing		
Creative Arts	Fiction	Ruth Prawer Jhabvala		Writing		
Creative Arts	Fiction	Alan Lelchuk	Brandeis University	Writing		
Creative Arts	Fiction	Cormac McCarthy		Writing	Also won in 1969	
Creative Arts	Fiction	Joseph McElroy	Queens College	Writing		
Creative Arts	Fiction	Ronald Sukenick	University of Colorado	Finishing his novel The Fortune Teller		
Creative Arts	Fiction	Hilma Wolitzer		Writing		
Creative Arts	Film	Les Blank		Filmmaking		
Creative Arts	Film	Mikhail Bogin		Filmmaking		
Creative Arts	Film	John Dubberstein		Filmmaking		
Creative Arts	Film	John E. Haugse	University of California, Santa Barbara	35mm color animated film dealing with "man examining the phenomenon of being alive - physically, spiritually and intellectually"		
Creative Arts	Film	Joan Jonas		Filmmaking		
Creative Arts	Film	Hubert Smith		Documentary making		
Creative Arts	Fine Arts	Dennis Ashbaugh	Bronx Community College	Painting		
Creative Arts	Fine Arts	Peter Busa	University of Minnesota	Painting		
Creative Arts	Fine Arts	Virginia Cuppaidge		Painting		
Creative Arts	Fine Arts	Robert Gordon		Sculpture		
Creative Arts	Fine Arts	Budd Hopkins		Painting		
Creative Arts	Fine Arts	Robert W. Irwin		Visual art		
Creative Arts	Fine Arts	Edward R. Kienholz		Sculpture		
Creative Arts	Fine Arts	Irving Kriesberg	State University of New York	Painting		
Creative Arts	Fine Arts	Loren MacIver		Painting		
Creative Arts	Fine Arts	Paul Mogensen		Painting		
Creative Arts	Fine Arts	Peter Reginato		Sculpture		
Creative Arts	Fine Arts	Fred Sandback		Sculpture		
Creative Arts	Fine Arts	Raymond Saunders	California State University, Hayward	Painting and drawing		
Creative Arts	Fine Arts	Michael Singer		Sculpture		
Creative Arts	Fine Arts	John Wesley		Painting		
Creative Arts	Fine Arts	Robert Whitman		Visual art		
Creative Arts	Fine Arts	Jack Whitten	Cooper Union	Painting		
Creative Arts	Fine Arts	Jack Youngerman		Sculpture		
Creative Arts	Music Composition	William H. Albright	University of Michigan	Composing	Also won in 1987	
Creative Arts	Music Composition	Kenneth Benshoof		Composing		
Creative Arts	Music Composition	Paul Chihara	University of California, Los Angeles	Composing		
Creative Arts	Music Composition	Roy Harris	California State University, Los Angeles	Composing	Also won in 1927, 1928	
Creative Arts	Music Composition	Barbara Kolb		Composing	Also won in 1971	
Creative Arts	Music Composition	Erik Lundborg	Newark Community Center of the Arts	Composing		
Creative Arts	Music Composition	Thelonious Monk		Composing		
Creative Arts	Music Composition	Robert Xavier Rodriguez	University of Texas, Dallas	Composing		
Creative Arts	Music Composition	Stanley Silverman		Composing	Also won in 1965	
Creative Arts	Music Composition	Richard Wernick	University of Pennsylvania	Composing		
Creative Arts	Music Composition	Yehudi Wyner	Yale University	Composing	Also won in 1959	
Creative Arts	Photography	Lewis Baltz				
Creative Arts	Photography	Mark Cohen	Wilkes College	Varied subjects in the Wilkes Barre area	Also won in 1971	
Creative Arts	Photography	Larry Fink		"Glamorous side of the world... the cocktail parties, the fancy splendor balls, the art openings, where culture, money, career and fanciness all seem to meet and mingle"	Also won in 1979	
Creative Arts	Photography	Chauncey Hare			Also won in 1969, 1971	
Creative Arts	Photography	George Krause	University of Houston (visiting)	Travels in Italy and Spain	Also won in 1967	
Creative Arts	Photography	Jerome Liebling	Hampshire College	Broad spectrum of political situations	Also won in 1981	
Creative Arts	Photography	John McWilliams	Georgia State University	Landscapes in the Southern United States		
Creative Arts	Photography	Nicholas Nixon	Massachusetts College of Art		Also won in 1986	
Creative Arts	Photography	Bill Owens				
Creative Arts	Poetry	Jon Anderson	University of Pittsburgh	Writing		
Creative Arts	Poetry	James Applewhite	Duke University	Writing		
Creative Arts	Poetry	Henri Coulette	California State University, Los Angeles	Writing		
Creative Arts	Poetry	Michael S. Harper	Brown University	Writing		
Creative Arts	Poetry	Donald Justice	University of Iowa	Writing		
Creative Arts	Poetry	Sandra McPherson	University of Iowa	Writing		
Creative Arts	Poetry	Czeslaw Milosz	University of California, Berkeley	Slavic languages and literatures		
Creative Arts	Poetry	Leonard Nathan	University of California, Berkeley	Writing		
Creative Arts	Poetry	James Tate	University of Massachusetts, Amherst	Writing		
Creative Arts	Poetry	Jean Valentine	Sarah Lawrence College	Writing		
Creative Arts	Video & Audio	Steina Vasulka	University of Buffalo	Electronic television images		
Humanities	American Literature	Emory B. Elliott, Jr.	Princeton University	American Revolution and the language of rebellion, 1730-1787		
Humanities	American Literature	William M. Gibson	University of Wisconsin, Madison	Annotated edition of the letters of W. D. Howells	Also won in 1964	
Humanities	American Literature	Charles R. Larson	American University	Critical study of Native American fiction		
Humanities	American Literature	Paul Zweig	Queens College	Critical biography of Walt Whitman		
Humanities	Architecture, Planning, and Design	Peter D. Eisenman	Cooper Union	Contemporary architecture		
Humanities	Architecture, Planning, and Design	James Marston Fitch	Columbia University	Architecture of the American people, 1586-1976		
Humanities	Architecture, Planning, and Design	Rai Y. Okamoto	Stanford University	Urban design and planning		
Humanities	Architecture, Planning, and Design	Thomas F. Reese	University of Texas, Austin	Relationship between Spanish architecture and reform politics in the late 18th century		
Humanities	Biography	William Phillips	Partisan Review			
Humanities	British History	Richard T. Vann	Wesleyan University	Forms of family life in Europe and North America before the Industrial Revolution		
Humanities	Classics	J. Rufus Fears	Indiana University	Evolution of the mythology of imperial power in the Roman Empire		
Humanities	Classics	Eleanor Winsor Leach	Wesleyan University and Trinity College	Development of landscapes in Roman poetry and Romano-Campanian mural painting		
Humanities	Classics	David G. Mitten	Harvard University	Compilation of a handbook of Greek and Roman sculptures		
Humanities	Classics	Cedric Hubbell Whitman	Harvard University	Commentary on The Iliad	Also won in 1961	
Humanities	East Asian Studies	John Whitney Hall	Yale University	Institutional study of the daimyo domain of Bizen, Japan during the 17th and 18th centuries	Also won in 1958	
Humanities	East Asian Studies	Thomas R. H. Havens	Connecticut College	World War II and Japanese society		
Humanities	East Asian Studies	Anthony C. Yu	University of Chicago	Translation of Journey to the West		
Humanities	Economic History	Philip Taft	Brown University (retired)	History of the labor movement in Alabama	Died November 1976	
Humanities	Economic History	Gary M. Walton	University of California, Berkeley (visiting)	Productivity and economic change in American colonial agriculture		
Humanities	Economic History	Jeffrey G. Williamson	University of Wisconsin, Madison	Income distribution in the US, 1816-1929		
Humanities	Economic History	Gavin Wright	University of Michigan			
Humanities	English Literature	Daniel Albright	University of Virginia	Personality in the novels of Thomas Mann, Virginia Woolf, D. H. Lawrence, and James Joyce		
Humanities	English Literature	Calvin Bedient	University of California, Los Angeles	Innovation in 20th-century Anglo-American poetry		
Humanities	English Literature	Leslie Brisman	Yale University	Victorian poetry		
Humanities	English Literature	N. John Hall	Bronx Community College	New edition of the letters of Anthony Trollope	Also won in 1984	
Humanities	English Literature	J. Paul Hunter				
Humanities	English Literature	Fred Kaplan	Queens College	Biographical study of Thomas Carlyle and the Victorians		
Humanities	English Literature	Shirley Strum Kenny	University of Maryland	Complete works of George Farquhar		
Humanities	English Literature	Richard A. Knowles	University of Wisconsin, Madison	Annotated edition of King Lear		
Humanities	English Literature	Juliet McMaster	University of Alberta			
Humanities	English Literature	David B. Morris	University of Iowa	Major poems of Alexander Pope		
Humanities	English Literature	Marvin Rosenberg	University of California, Berkeley	Interpretations of Hamlet		
Humanities	Fine Arts Research	David Antin	University of California, San Diego	20th-century modernism		
Humanities	Fine Arts Research	Kermit S. Champa	Brown University	Abstract geometrical paintings of Piet Mondrian		
Humanities	Fine Arts Research	Anthony M. Clark		History of painting in Rome, 1700-1799	Died in November 1976	
Humanities	Fine Arts Research	Richard S. Field	Wesleyan University	Origin and early history of the woodcut, 1380-1440		
Humanities	Fine Arts Research	Carter Ratcliff	School of Visual Arts	History of American art criticism		
Humanities	Fine Arts Research	William R. Rearick	University of Maryland, College Park	Drawings of Titian and his Venetian contemporaries		
Humanities	French History	William R. Keylor	Boston University	Franco-American relations since 1914		
Humanities	French History	A. Lloyd Moote	University of Southern California	Biographical interpretation of the reign of Louis XIII		
Humanities	French History	Dale K. Van Kley	Calvin College	Church, state, and society in France, 1750-1770		
Humanities	French Literature	Michel Beaujour	New York University	French literary self-portrayal from the Renaissance to the contemporary period		
Humanities	French Literature	Ottah Allen Thiher	Middlebury College			
Humanities	General Nonfiction	Paul Brodeur	Columbia University			
Humanities	General Nonfiction	Seymour Krim				
Humanities	General Nonfiction	A. J. Langguth		US involvement in Latin America		
Humanities	General Nonfiction	Kevin Starr		Volume 2 of Americans and the California Dream		
Humanities	General Nonfiction	Jose Yglesias			Also won in 1970	
Humanities	German & East European History	Michael Hans Kater	York University			
Humanities	German & East European History	Béla K. Király	Brooklyn College	War and society in the 19th and 20th centuries		
Humanities	German & Scandinavian Literature	Alan P. Cottrell	University of Michigan			
Humanities	German & Scandinavian Literature	Katharina Mommsen	Stanford University	Genesis of Goethe's West–östlicher Divan		
Humanities	German & Scandinavian Literature	Oskar Seidlin	Indiana University	Clemens Brentano	Also won in 1962	
Humanities	History of Science and Technology	Stillman Drake	University of Toronto	Biographical account of Galileo's scientific career	Also won in 1971	
Humanities	History of Science and Technology	C. W. Francis Everitt	Stanford University	James Clerk Maxwell		
Humanities	History of Science and Technology	Robert S. Westman	University of California, Los Angeles			
Humanities	Iberian & Latin American History	Gerald H. Meaker	California State University, Northridge	Role of political intellectuals in early 20th-century Spain		
Humanities	Italian Literature	Gustavo Costa	University of California, Berkeley	Role in the sublime in Italian culture		
Humanities	Latin American Literature	Dauril Alden	University of Washington			
Humanities	Latin American Literature	Jean Franco	Stanford University	Critical study of oral performance and literature practice in modern Spanish American literature		
Humanities	Linguistics	Robert Hetzron	University of California, Santa Barbara	Common ancestor of the Semitic languages (Arabic, Hebrew, Assyro-Babylonian, and Ethiopian)		
Humanities	Linguistics	Henry Hiz	University of Pennsylvania			
Humanities	Linguistics	Edward Stankiewicz	Yale University	Accentual systems of the Slavic languages		
Humanities	Linguistics	Ann Harleman Stewart	University of Washington			
Humanities	Linguistics	Ladislav Zgusta	University of Illinois	Toponymy of Asia Minor	Also won in 1983	
Humanities	Literary Criticism	Walter L. Reed	Yale University	Critical study on the history and theory of the novel		
Humanities	Literary Criticism	William Willeford	University of Washington			
Humanities	Medieval History	Howard Kaminsky	Florida International University	History of Europe, 1200-1500		
Humanities	Medieval Literature	Curt F. Bühler	Pierpoint Morgan Library	Bibliographic study of the Missale Speciale	Also won in 1964	
Humanities	Music Research	D. W. Krummel	University of Illinois	History of music printing and publishing to 1700		
Humanities	Music Research	Vera Brodsky Lawrence		New York world of George Templeton Strong		
Humanities	Music Research	Edward E. Lowinsky	University of Chicago	Edition of the correspondence of Giovanni Spataro	Also won in 1946	
Humanities	Near Eastern Studies	Lee I. Levine				
Humanities	Near Eastern Studies	Stanislav Segert	University of California, Los Angeles			
Humanities	Philosophy	Robert S. Brumbaugh	Yale University	Classical philosophy and the nature of time		
Humanities	Philosophy	S. Marshall Cohen	Richmond College	Morality and international conduct		
Humanities	Philosophy	Alan Donagan		Action theory		
Humanities	Philosophy	Jay Rosenberg	University of North Carolina	Pragmatic justification of regulative principles		
Humanities	Religion	Malcolm L. Diamond				
Humanities	Religion	William R. Schoedel	University of Illinois	Commentary on the letters of Ignatius of Antioch		
Humanities	Religion	Claude Welch	Graduate Theological Union	Volume 2 of Protestant Thought in the 19th Century		
Humanities	Renaissance History	Charles B. Schmitt	Warburg Institute	Latin translations of Aristotle		
Humanities	Renaissance History	Charles Trinkaus	University of Michigan	Comparative history of Renaissance and Reformation intellectual history		
Humanities	Russian History	Stephen F. Cohen	Princeton University		Also won in 1988	
Humanities	Slavic Literature	Victor Erlich	Yale University	Reexamination of Russian literary culture in the 1920s	Also won in 1957, 1964	
Humanities	Spanish & Portuguese Literature	Anthony Bonner				
Humanities	Spanish & Portuguese Literature	Peter B. Goldman	Queens College	Sociology of literature in 19th-century Spain		
Humanities	Theatre Arts	Charles R. Lyons	Stanford University	Conventions of tragic drama		
Humanities	Theatre Arts	Andrei Serban				
Humanities	United States History	Patricia U. Bonomi	New York University	Relationship between organized religion and politics in colonial America		
Humanities	United States History	Steven A. Channing	University of Kentucky	Race, class, and ideology in the South, 1861-1865		
Humanities	United States History	Lucy S. Dawidowicz	Yeshiva University	History of Jews in America		
Humanities	United States History	Theodore Draper		US and world power		
Humanities	United States History	Otis L. Graham, Jr.	University of California, Santa Barbara	Social setting, as well as the public policy philosophy, of FDR's New Deal		
Humanities	United States History	Bruce Kuklick	University of Pennsylvania	Formation of the American usable past, 1945-1963		
Humanities	United States History	Eric L. McKitrick	Columbia University	Age of Washington and Jefferson	Also won in 1970	
Humanities	United States History	Robert G. Pope	University of Buffalo	Social context of Puritan-Quaker conflict in 17th-century New England		
Humanities	United States History	Barbara M. Solomon	Harvard University	Influence of collegiate education on the career choices of 20th-century American women		
Humanities	United States History	Sam Bass Warner	Boston University	Interpretive study of 20th-century Boston		
Humanities	United States History	Robin W. Winks	Yale University	Nature of American imperialism		
Natural Sciences	Applied Mathematics	Ron F. Blackwelder	Garrett AiResearch and Hersh Acoustical Engineering	Research at the Max Planck Institute for Fluid Mechanics		
Natural Sciences	Applied Mathematics	Stephen Childress				
Natural Sciences	Applied Mathematics	Stephen E. Harris	Stanford University	Electrical engineering and applied physics		
Natural Sciences	Applied Mathematics	Robert H. Socolow	Princeton University			
Natural Sciences	Astronomy-Astrophysics	P. Buford Price	University of California, Berkeley	Relativistic heavy ion physics		
Natural Sciences	Astronomy-Astrophysics	Ben Zuckerman	University of Maryland			
Natural Sciences	Chemistry	Hans C. Andersen	Stanford University	Physical chemistry		
Natural Sciences	Chemistry	Tomas Baer	University of North Carolina	Physical chemistry		
Natural Sciences	Chemistry	Jesse Lee Beauchamp	California Institute of Technology			
Natural Sciences	Chemistry	Alan H. Cowley	University of Texas	Shapes of molecules in non-metals and new types of penicillin		
Natural Sciences	Chemistry	John P. Fackler Jr.	Case-Western Reserve University	Inorganic chemistry		
Natural Sciences	Chemistry	Aron Kuppermann	California Institute of Technology			
Natural Sciences	Chemistry	Yuan T. Lee	University of California, Berkeley	Physical chemistry		
Natural Sciences	Chemistry	Jerrold Meinwald	Cornell University	Chemical ecology	Also won in 1960	
Natural Sciences	Chemistry	Leo A. Paquette	Ohio State University			
Natural Sciences	Chemistry	Kenneth Sauer	Lawrence Berkeley National Laboratory	Biophysical chemistry		
Natural Sciences	Chemistry	Henry F. Schaefer, III	University of California, Berkeley	Computational chemistry		
Natural Sciences	Chemistry	William A. Steele	Pennsylvania State University	Surface chemistry		
Natural Sciences	Chemistry	Kenneth N. Trueblood	University of California, Los Angeles	Research at the Swiss Federal Institute of Technology		
Natural Sciences	Chemistry	John H. Weare	University of California, San Diego	Interaction of atomic beams with metallic surfaces		
Natural Sciences	Computer Science	Robert W. Floyd	Stanford University	Architectural and design issues in computer programming		
Natural Sciences	Computer Science	Allen Newell	Carnegie Mellon University	Systematic treatment in the field of artificial intelligence		
Natural Sciences	Earth Science	A. W. Crompton	Harvard University	Vertebrate paleontology and functional morphology	Also won in 1983	
Natural Sciences	Earth Science	Ian W. D. Dalziel	Columbia University	Research at the Swiss Federal Institute of Technology		
Natural Sciences	Earth Science	Leon Knopoff	University of California, Los Angeles			
Natural Sciences	Earth Science	Abraham Lerman	Northwestern University	Chemical processes occurring in natural environments on the surface of the earth		
Natural Sciences	Earth Science	Kurt Marti				
Natural Sciences	Engineering	Andreas Acrivos	Stanford University	Fluid mechanics	Also won in 1959	
Natural Sciences	Engineering	Joseph L. Katz	Clarkson College			
Natural Sciences	Engineering	L. Gary Leal	California Institute of Technology	Fluid dynamics and transport phenomena		
Natural Sciences	Mathematics	William B. Arveson	University of California, Berkeley	Operator theory		
Natural Sciences	Mathematics	Raoul Bott	Harvard University	Geometry and topology		
Natural Sciences	Mathematics	Wendell H. Fleming	Brown University	Applied probability		
Natural Sciences	Mathematics	H. Jerome Keisler	University of Wisconsin, Madison	Mathematical logic		
Natural Sciences	Mathematics	Joseph J. Kohn	Princeton University	Mathematical analysis		
Natural Sciences	Mathematics	Alan C. Newell	Clarkson College of Technology	Applied mathematics		
Natural Sciences	Mathematics	Robert Osserman	Stanford University	Differential geometry and complex analysis		
Natural Sciences	Mathematics	Elias M. Stein	Princeton University	Mathematical analysis		
Natural Sciences	Mathematics	Frank W. Warner	University of Pennsylvania	Differential geometry		
Natural Sciences	Medicine & Health	Donald L. Bartel	Cornell University	Biomechanics		
Natural Sciences	Medicine & Health	Theodore Friedmann	University of California, San Diego			
Natural Sciences	Medicine & Health	Jerry A. Schneider	University of California, San Diego			
Natural Sciences	Molecular & Cellular Biology	Raymond L. Blakley	University of Iowa	How vitamin B12 affects reactions in the body, particularly the synthesis of blood cells and membranes in neural tissue		
Natural Sciences	Molecular & Cellular Biology	Peter J. Bruns	Cornell University	Genetic analysis of vegetable growth in Tetrahymena		
Natural Sciences	Molecular & Cellular Biology	David Epel	Scripps Institute of Oceanography			
Natural Sciences	Molecular & Cellular Biology	James W. Fristrom	University of California, Berkeley	Molecular and developmental genetics		
Natural Sciences	Molecular & Cellular Biology	Leonard A. Herzenberg	Stanford University	Immunogenetics and cellular immunology	Also won in 1986	
Natural Sciences	Molecular & Cellular Biology	Roger W. Jeanloz	Harvard University	Carbohydrate chemistry		
Natural Sciences	Molecular & Cellular Biology	Laurence H. Kedes	Stanford University	Molecular and cell biology		
Natural Sciences	Molecular & Cellular Biology	Melvin P. Klein	Lawrence Berkeley National Laboratory	Biophysics		
Natural Sciences	Molecular & Cellular Biology	Wayne L. Mattice	Louisiana State University	Physical chemistry of molecules		
Natural Sciences	Molecular & Cellular Biology	John R. Preer, Jr.	Indiana University	Genetic and molecular studies in cell biology		
Natural Sciences	Molecular & Cellular Biology	Michael A. Savageau	University of Michigan			
Natural Sciences	Molecular & Cellular Biology	Robert D. Wells	University of Wisconsin, Madison	DNA biochemistry		
Natural Sciences	Molecular & Cellular Biology	Hans J. Zweerink	Duke University Medical Center			
Natural Sciences	Neuroscience	Douglas G. Stuart	University of Arizona			
Natural Sciences	Neuroscience	A. O. Dennis Willows	Friday Harbor Laboratories	How evolution of the nervous system takes place at the cellular level; studied mollusks in the South Pacific, Mediterranean, and North Atlantic		
Natural Sciences	Organismic Biology & Ecology	Marcus W. Feldman	Stanford University	Population genetics		
Natural Sciences	Organismic Biology & Ecology	Bernd Heinrich	University of California, Berkeley	Energetics and temperature regulation of insects		
Natural Sciences	Organismic Biology & Ecology	C. Richard Taylor	Harvard University			
Natural Sciences	Physics	John D. Axe	Brookhaven National Laboratory	Solid-state physics		
Natural Sciences	Physics	Stephan Berko	Brandeis University			
Natural Sciences	Physics	William B. Daniels	University of Delaware	Solid-state physics		
Natural Sciences	Physics	William M. Fairbank	Stanford University	Low temperature physics		
Natural Sciences	Physics	Leo Falicov	University of California, Berkeley	Solid-state physics		
Natural Sciences	Physics	Daniel Koltun	University of Rochester			
Natural Sciences	Physics	Joel L. Lebowitz	Yeshiva University			
Natural Sciences	Physics	Richard E. Norton	University of California, Los Angeles			
Natural Sciences	Physics	Douglas J. Scalapino	University of California, Santa Barbara	Solid-state physics		
Natural Sciences	Physics	Mahiko Suzuki	University of California, Berkeley	High-energy particle physics		
Natural Sciences	Physics	Bryan Hobson Wildenthal	Michigan State University	Nuclear structure		
Natural Sciences	Plant Science	Stephen H. Howell	University of California at San Diego			
Natural Sciences	Plant Science	David T. A. Lamport	Michigan State University			
Natural Sciences	Plant Science	J. Philip Thornber	University of California, Los Angeles			
Natural Sciences	Statistics	Stephen M. Stigler	University of Wisconsin, Madison	History of mathematical statistics		
Natural Sciences	Statistics	Geoffrey S. Watson	Princeton University	Geophysics		
Social Sciences	Anthropology & Cultural Studies	Alexander Alland, Jr.	Columbia University			
Social Sciences	Anthropology & Cultural Studies	Karl W. Butzer	University of Chicago			
Social Sciences	Anthropology & Cultural Studies	George A. Collier	Stanford University	Cultural history of the Indian in Mesoamerica		
Social Sciences	Anthropology & Cultural Studies	Douglas L. Oliver	University of Hawaii	Captain Bligh's second breadfruit voyage to Tahiti		
Social Sciences	Anthropology & Cultural Studies	Melford E. Spiro			Also won in 1983	
Social Sciences	Anthropology & Cultural Studies	Norman E. Whitten	University of Illinois	Ethnicity and cultural adaptation		
Social Sciences	Economics	Orley C. Ashenfelter	Princeton University			
Social Sciences	Economics	Herbert E. Klarman	New York University	Research at the National Center for Health Services Research		
Social Sciences	Economics	Mukul Kumar Majumdar	Cornell University			
Social Sciences	Economics	V. Kerry Smith	State University of New York at Binghamton	Economics of natural resource scarcity		
Social Sciences	Economics	Hugo F. Sonnenschein	Northwestern University	Theories of monopolistic competition		
Social Sciences	Education	Joel S. Berke	Columbia University			
Social Sciences	Education	Nathaniel Lees Gage	Stanford University	Study of teaching		
Social Sciences	Education	David Perkins	Harvard University	Creativity in the arts		
Social Sciences	Geography & Environmental Studies	Leslie Curry	University of Toronto	Research at Cambridge University		
Social Sciences	Geography & Environmental Studies	David Harvey	Johns Hopkins University	French urbanization during the 20th century		
Social Sciences	Geography & Environmental Studies	Jack D. Ives	University of Colorado	Avalanche and other mountain hazards in the Alps		
Social Sciences	Law	Ronan E. Degnan	University of California, Berkeley	Legal implications of transnational commercial transactions		
Social Sciences	Law	John K. McNulty	University of California, Berkeley	Structural reforms in the US federal tax system		
Social Sciences	Law	Donald F. Turner	Harvard University	Treaties on various subsidies of antitrust law		
Social Sciences	Law	Roberto Mangabeira Unger	Harvard University	Contract law		
Social Sciences	Political Science	Giuseppe Di Palma	University of California, Berkeley	Political changes in Italy, Portugal, and Spain		
Social Sciences	Political Science	Richard F. Fenno, Jr.	University of Rochester			
Social Sciences	Political Science	Stanley B. Greenberg	Yale University	Capitalist development and race relations		
Social Sciences	Political Science	Fred I. Greenstein	Princeton University	History of the expansion of the presidential office, 1933-1974		
Social Sciences	Political Science	Martin Landau	University of California, Berkeley	Organizational theory		
Social Sciences	Political Science	Giacomo Sani	Ohio State University	Research in Italy		
Social Sciences	Political Science	Edward R. Tufte	Princeton University			
Social Sciences	Political Science	Kenneth N. Waltz	University of California, Berkeley	Construction of political theories		
Social Sciences	Psychology	Thomas G. Bever	Columbia University	Cognition and aesthetics		
Social Sciences	Psychology	Gordon M. Burghardt	University of Tennessee Knoxville			
Social Sciences	Psychology	Harold B. Gerard	University of California, Los Angeles			
Social Sciences	Psychology	William Hodos	University of Maryland			
Social Sciences	Psychology	Ewart A. Thomas	Stanford University	Psychology and economics		
Social Sciences	Sociology	Janet L. Abu-Lughod	Northwestern University	Comparative study of Cairo, Rabat, and Tunis		
Social Sciences	Sociology	Judith Blake	University of California, Berkeley	Changing status of women in developed countries		
Social Sciences	Sociology	Doris R. Entwisle	Johns Hopkins University	Sociology of human development		
Social Sciences	Sociology	Cynthia Fuchs Epstein	Queens College and Columbia University	Women lawyers and the changing context of the legal profession		
Social Sciences	Sociology	David R. Heise	University of North Carolina	Attitude control theory		
Social Sciences	Sociology	Arlie Russell Hochschild	University of California, Berkeley	Sociology of emotions		
Social Sciences	Sociology	Morris Janowitz	University of Chicago	Socio-political change in the US, 1920-1970		
Social Sciences	Sociology	William Petersen	Ohio State University			
Social Sciences	Sociology	James B. Rule	SUNY Stony Brook			

== 1976 Latin American and Caribbean Fellows ==
Category	Field of Study	Fellow	Institutional association	Research topic	Notes	Ref
Creative Arts	Fiction	Alberto Cousté	Círculo de Lectores	Writing		
Creative Arts	Fiction	Silvina Ocampo		Writing		
Creative Arts	Fine Arts	Juan Downey	Pratt Institute	Video art	Also won in 1971	
Creative Arts	Fine Arts	Emilio Rodríguez-Larraín		Sculpture	Appointed as Emilio Juan Rodriguez-Larraín	
Creative Arts	Music Composition	Lan Adomián		Composing		
Creative Arts	Music Composition	Gabriel Brncic	Phonos	Composing		
Creative Arts	Poetry	Enrique Fidel Verástegui Peláez		Writing		
Humanities	Architecture, Planning, and Design	Francisco Bullrich		Argentine architecture, 1870-1970		
Humanities	Fine Arts Research	Fermín Beltrán Fèvre	Criterio	Interrelationship between North American and Argentine art and artists, 1946-1976		
Humanities	Iberian & Latin American History	Boris Fausto	State University of Campinas	Society and politics in Brazil, 1920-1937		
Humanities	Latin American Literature	João Alexandre Costa Barbosa	University of São Paulo	Comparative studies in modern poetry		
Humanities	Music Research	Luis Félix Merino	University of Chile	Chilean music of the 19th and 20th centuries		
Natural Science	Astronomy-Astrophysics	Mario Novello	Brazilian Center for Research in Physics	Gravitation and cosmology		
Natural Science	Earth Science	Gerardo Eugenio Bossi	CONICET and National University of Tucumán	Continental evolution of southern South America and the breakup of the Pangaean continent		
Natural Science	Mathematics	Miguel E. M. Herrera	CONICET and University of Buenos Aires	Complex variables		
Natural Science	Medicine & Health	Alejo Florin-Christensen	Center for Medical Education and Clinical Research	Immunochemistry and clinical endocrinology		
Natural Science	Molecular & Cellular Biology	Israel David Algranati	University of Buenos Aires	Protein synthesis		
Natural Science	Molecular & Cellular Biology	María T. Franze Fernández	CONICET and University of Buenos Aires	Control of cell growth		
Natural Science	Molecular & Cellular Biology	Salomón Zender Langer	CONICET and University of Buenos Aires	Cardiovascular pharmacology		
Natural Science	Molecular & Cellular Biology	Mario Nestor Parisi	CONICET and University of Buenos Aires	Aboriginal mythology and symbolism in Colombia		
Natural Science	Organismic Biology & Ecology	Karel Vohnout	Tropical Agricultural Research and Training Center	Mathematical models for livestock feeding systems		
Natural Science	Physics	Roberto Luzzi	State University of Campinas	Solid-state physics		
Natural Science	Physics	Horácio Carlos Panepucci	University of São Paulo	Solid-state physics		
Natural Science	Plant Science	Carlos Eduardo de Mattos Bicudo	University of São Paulo and Botanical Institute of São Paulo	Freshwater algae		
Natural Science	Plant Science	Elsa M. Zardini	University of Buenos Aires and National University of La Plata	Indigenous medicinal plants of Northeastern Argentina and Southern Paraguay		
Social Sciences	Anthropology & Cultural Studies	Duccio Bonavia Berber	Cayetano Heredia University	Pre-ceramic maize of Huarmey		
Social Sciences	Anthropology & Cultural Studies	Alfredo López Austin	National Autonomous University of Mexico	Concepts of the human body, the etiology of disease, and the natural world in Aztec culture		
Social Sciences	Anthropology & Cultural Studies	Gerardo Reichel-Dolmatoff				
Social Sciences	Law	Carlos Santiago Nino	University of Buenos Aires	Philosophy of law	Also won in 1989	
Social Sciences	Sociology	Jorge Balán	Torcuato di Tella Institute	Regional society, economy, and settlement patterns in Argentina, 1870-1930		

== See also ==
- Guggenheim Fellowship
- List of Guggenheim Fellowships awarded in 1975
- List of Guggenheim Fellowships awarded in 1977
