= Breaking and Entering (disambiguation) =

Breaking and Entering is another term for burglary, a crime.

Breaking and Entering may also refer to:

- "Breaking and Entering" (Burn Notice)
- Breaking and Entering (film), a 2006 romantic drama film
  - Breaking and Entering: Music from the Film, the soundtrack album for the film Breaking and Entering
- Breaking and Entering (Williams novel), a 1988 novel by Joy Williams
- Breaking and Entering (Keating novel), a 2000 crime novel by H.R.F. Keating
- "Breaking & Entering" (Prison Break)
- "Breaking and Entering" (song), a 1981 dance single by Dee Dee Sharp-Gamble
- "Break & Enter" a 1994 song by the Prodigy from Music for the Jilted Generation
