= Beardsell =

Beardsell is a surname. Notable people with the surname include:

- Joseph Beardsell (1907–1978), English cricketer
- Richard Beardsell (born 1979), British track and field athlete

== See also ==
- Jeffery Beardsall (born 1940), English artist
