= William Coles =

William Coles may refer to:

- William Coles (MP) (1616–1697), English lawyer and politician
- William Coles (RAF officer) (1913–1979), Royal Air Force officer and British bobsledder
- William E. Coles Jr. (1932–2005), American novelist and professor.
- William Coles (botanist) or Cole (1626–1662), British botanist
- William Arthur Coles, physicist
- William Charles Coles (born 1965), United States Virgin Islands archer
