= John K. McNulty =

American legal scholar (1934–2020)

John Kent McNulty (October 13, 1934 – September 26, 2020) was an American legal scholar, who was a professor of law at the University of California, Berkeley, School of Law for 38 years from 1964 to 2002 and who as a legal educator and scholar, was influential in shaping U.S. tax law policy debate during the later quarter of the 20th century.

== Career ==
McNulty was born in Buffalo, New York, the son of Robert William and Margaret Ellen (Duthie) McNulty.

He was Roger J. Traynor Professor of Law for the last decade of his career from 1991 to 2002 and was a professor emeritus at the law school. He was for over 30 years and continued to be even after his academic retirement a noted researcher in the area of structural reform of U.S. tax law.

His work is of particular importance in the area of proposals for U.S. federal "Integration" of corporate and individual taxation. "Integration" of corporate and individual income taxes refers to any plan under which corporate income is only taxed once.

== Writing ==
McNulty has published 26 times in scholarly journals. His articles have been translated into several foreign languages, including Korean, Japanese and German.

Notable among these articles are:

- "Integrating the Corporate Income Tax?", 31 M.J. Comparative Law, 401–426, (1983)
- "The United States’ Individual and Corporate Income Tax: Future Reform Possibilities", 1 Bond Law Rev., Australia, 52–78, (1989)
- "Reform of the Individual Income Tax By Integration of the Corporate Income Tax", 46 Tax Notes, 1445–1454 (1990) *"Preserving the Virtues of Sub Chapter S in an Integrated World", 47 Tax L. Rev. 1001, (1992)
- "Corporate and Individual Income Tax Integration in the United States During the 1990s", 2 Tilburg Foreign Law Review 205–228 (1993)
- "Why Subchapter S (Partnership Tax Treatment for Closely-Held Electing Corporations) Should Be Retained Even If Integration By Some Other Method Is Enacted In The United States", 2 Tilburg Foreign Law Review (The Netherlands) 377–392 (1993)
- "Corporate Income Tax Reform In The United States: Proposals For Integration Of The Corporate and Individual Income Taxes", 12 International Tax and Business Lawyer (now the Berkeley Journal of International Law) 161–259 (1994).

McNulty has also written 7 textbooks on tax law.

- co-authored with Lathrope of Hastings College of Law the law school horn books Federal Income Taxation of Individuals in a Nutshell, 7th edition, published in 2004, Federal Estate and Gift Taxation (with McCouch), published in 2003, and Federal Income Taxation of S Corporations (with Westin & Beck), published in 1992.
- sole author of the law school text Federal Income Taxation of Business Enterprises, published in 1995 with a 2nd edition published in 1999.

== Legal education and career ==
McNulty received his Bachelor of Arts with honors and as a member of Phi Beta Kappa from Swarthmore College in 1956 and a Bachelor of Laws from Yale University in 1959 (Order of the Coif). He was an editor of the Yale Law Journal. At Yale Law, McNulty studied under Friedrich Kessler. McNulty, was, subsequently, a law clerk to U.S. Supreme Court Justice Hugo Black from 1959 to 1960. McNulty has been a member of the State of Ohio bar since 1961 and of the bar of the United States Supreme Court since 1964.

== See also ==
- Taxation in New Zealand For context for articles and motives for the U.S. national "Integration" debate and its implications in multinational business, New Zealand integrated its corporate and individual tax in the mid-1980s.
- S corporation
- List of law clerks for the first seat of the Supreme Court of the United States
- List of Guggenheim Fellowships awarded in 1976.
