= State of Grace (novel) =

1973 debut novel by Joy Williams

- Author: Joy Williams
- Genre: Literary fiction
- Publisher: Doubleday
- Publication date: April 22, 1973
- Pages: 272
- ISBN: 978-0385000079

State of Grace is a 1973 debut novel by Joy Williams, published by Doubleday. Receiving "nearly universal acclaim" and high expectations set for Williams' career henceforth, it was a finalist for the 1974 National Book Award for Fiction.

== Critical reception ==
Gail Godwin, writing for The New York Times, called the book a "Bleak but beautifully-crafted first novel" and concluded her review with "a most grateful welcome to a first‐rate new novelist."

The Brooklyn Rail lauded Williams' ability to capture "self-abandonment in stunning and singular prose—incantatory, lush, and decidedly different from all that she would come to write in the fifty years that have followed State of Grace's publication" and the "fever dream" that enraptures her protagonist, Kate.
