= Carter Ratcliff =

American art critic, writer and poet (born 1941)

Carter Ratcliff (born 1941 in Seattle, Washington) is an American art critic, writer and poet. His books on art include John Singer Sargent (Abbeville Press, 1982); John Singer Sargent (Masterpiece Edition) (Abbeville Press, 2023); Robert Longo (Rizzoli, 1985); The Fate of a Gesture: Jackson Pollock and Postwar American Art (Farrar, Straus, Giroux, 1996); and Andy Warhol: Portraits (Phaidon Press, 2007). In 1976 he was an awarded a Guggenheim fellowship in fine arts research. Ratcliff has contributed to numerous magazines including Art in America, ARTnews, Art International, Arts Magazine, Artforum, and Parkett.

Ratcliff was the guest editor of the September 2013 issue of The Brooklyn Rail, in which he spearheaded the discussion, "What is Art?". Ratcliff posits:

"artists’ intentions are at least partially unconscious. With the exception of those happy to settle into a rut, artists try to bring their intentions to light—to clarify and strengthen and, it may be, reinvent them. Coming up against another's incompatible intentions can speed the process. Awareness of who you are not can help you see who you are—or might become...."
