= Baruch A. Levine =

American biblical scholar (1930–2021)

- Born: July 10, 1930; Cleveland, Ohio
- Died: December 16, 2021 (aged 91); Hamden, Connecticut
- Board member of: Society of Biblical Literature
- Awards: Guggenheim Fellowship for Humanities, US & Canada

Academic background
- Education: Brandeis University (PhD)

Academic work
- Discipline: Biblical studies
- Main interests: Hebrew Bible; Torah exegesis

Baruch Abraham Levine (July 10, 1930 – December 16, 2021) was the Skirball Professor Emeritus of Bible and Ancient Near Eastern Studies at New York University.

Levine was educated at Case Western Reserve University and obtained his PhD at Brandeis University in 1962; he mainly wrote in the fields of biblical and Middle Eastern studies. In 1975, Levine was awarded a Guggenheim Fellowship for Humanities, US & Canada.

Levine contributed the Leviticus volume to the JPS Torah Commentary series and the Numbers volumes (1–20 and 21–36, with translation) to the Anchor Yale Bible series. In 1975 he published with James Bennett Pritchard The Israelites, the 19th book in the Time-Life 20 vol. series The Emergence of Man. He also wrote In the Presence of the Lord: A Study of Cult and Some Cultic Terms in Ancient Israel (Brill, 1997).

Levine was president of the American Oriental Society, the Association for Jewish Studies, and the Biblical Colloquium, and he also was a board member of the Society of Biblical Literature.

Levine died in Hamden, Connecticut, on December 16, 2021, at the age of 91.
