= Honored Guest =

2004 short story collection by Joy Williams

Honored Guest: Stories
- Author: Joy Williams
- Genre: Literary fiction
- Publisher: Knopf
- Publication date: October 5, 2004
- Publication place: United States
- Pages: 213
- ISBN: 978-0-679-44647-7
- OCLC: 54775880
- Dewey Decimal: 813/.54
- LC Class: PS3573.I4496 H66 2004

Honored Guest is a 2004 short story collection by Joy Williams, published by Knopf. Its short story of the same name was published in Harper's Magazine in the June 1994 issue.

== Critical reception ==
The New York Times called "Charity" the "collection's finest story" and made note of Williams' "terse, dread-filled writing style whose pulse it is probably safer not to quicken."

In a starred review, Publishers Weekly stated that "Though some of her more absurd tales may perplex, discriminating readers will be greatly satisfied with this rich, darkly humorous and provocative collection." Kirkus Reviews compared Williams' characters to Raymond Carver's and concluded the book as "Twelve ambitious and expert stories, yet seldom involving."
