= Paul Sniderman =

American political scientist

- Born: 1941 (age 84–85)
- Education: University of Toronto; University of California, Berkeley
- Occupation: Political scientist
- Employer: Stanford University

Paul Michael Sniderman (born 1941) is an American political scientist, and the Fairleigh S. Dickinson Jr. Professor of Public Policy at Stanford University.

== Early life ==
Sniderman was born in 1941. He graduated from the University of Toronto, and he earned a PhD from the University of California, Berkeley.

== Career ==
Sniderman started his academic career as Assistant Professor at Stanford University from 1969 to 1971, and at the University of Toronto from 1971-72. Back as Stanford he was Associate Professor for 1975 to 1981, where in 1981 he was appointed Professor of Public Policy. In 1987 he was also appointed Professor of Criminology at the University of Toronto. Since 1987 he is also associated with the University of California as Research Political Scientist, and since 1990 also as Research Psychologist. At Stanford University he chaired the Department of Political Science from 2001 to 2004 and is senior fellow at Stanford University's Hoover Institution.

Sniderman has received many awards. Among them a Guggenheim Fellowship, 1975–76. He has been a fellow of the American Academy of Arts and Sciences since 1997.

== Work ==
Sniderman is noted for developing instruments capable of probing attitudes towards sensitive issued like racial or ethnic prejudice that enable researchers to discover the true attitudes of subjects in populations predisposed to give the socially acceptable response rather than express their true feelings.

== Publications ==
Sniderman authored and co-authored numerous publications. A selection:

- Paul M. Sniderman 1975. Personality and Democratic Politics. Berkeley: University of California Press
- Paul M. Sniderman 1981. A Question of Loyalty. Berkeley: University of California Press
- Paul M. Sniderman and Michael Gray Hagan. 1985. Race and Inequality: A Study in American Values. Chatham, N.J.: Chatham House.
- Paul M. Sniderman, Richard A. Brody, and Philip E. Tetlock 1991. Reasoning and Choice: Explorations in Political Psychology. New York: Cambridge University Press.
- Paul M. Sniderman, Philip E. Tetlock, and Edward G. Carmines 1993. (eds.) Prejudice, Politics and the American Dilemma, Stanford: Stanford University Press.
- Paul M. Sniderman and Thomas Piazza 1993. The Scar of Race. Cambridge, Massachusetts: Harvard University Press.
- Diana Mutz, Paul M. Sniderman, and Richard A. Brody 1996. (eds.). Political Persuasion. Ann Arbor, Mich.: University of Michigan Press.
- Paul M. Sniderman, Joseph F. Fletcher, Peter Russell, and Philip E. Tetlock 1996. The Clash of Rights: Liberty, Equality, and Legitimacy in Pluralist Democracies. New Haven, Conn: Yale University Press.
- Paul M. Sniderman and Edward G. Carmines. 1997. Reaching Beyond Race. Cambridge, Massachusetts: Harvard University Press.
- Paul M. Sniderman, Pierangelo Peri, Rui de Figuerido, and Thomas Piazza. 2000. The Outsider: Prejudice and Politics in Italy. Princeton, NJ: Princeton University Press. ISBN 0-691-04839-8
- Paul M. Sniderman and Thomas Piazza, 2002. Black Pride and Black Prejudice. Princeton, N.J.: Princeton University Press.
- Gerard Grunberg, Mayer, Nonna, et Paul M. Sniderman (eds.), 2002. La démocratie à l'épreuve. Une nouvelle approche de l'opinion des Français. Paris: Presses de Sciences Po. ISBN 2-7246-0875-5
- Saris, Willem E., and Paul M. Sniderman, eds. 2004. Studies in Public Opinion: Attitudes, Nonattitudes, Measurement Error, and Change. Princeton, N.J.: Princeton: Princeton University Press.
