= Alan C. Newell =

Irish American mathematician

- Born: 5 November 1941 (age 84); Dublin, Ireland
- Citizenship: Ireland and United States
- Education: Trinity College Dublin; MIT
- Awards: Guggenheim Fellow (1976); Humboldt Research Award 1988; John von Neumann Lecture (2004); Society for Industrial and Applied Mathematics Fellow 2009
- Scientific career
- Workplaces: Clarkson University; University of Arizona; University of Warwick
- Thesis: The transfer of spectral energy in non-linear dispersive systems (1965)
- Doctoral advisor: David Benney

Alan C. Newell (born 5 November 1941 in Dublin) is an Irish/American mathematician and Regents Professor at the University of Arizona. He was awarded a Guggenheim Fellowship in 1976 and in 2004 the John von Neumann Lecture for the Society for Industrial and Applied Mathematics. He was a Senior Scientist Humboldt Fellow in 1988–1989 and was elected a Fellow of the Society for Industrial and Applied Mathematics in 2009.

Over a period of thirty years (1971–2000), Alan C. Newell successfully led the Department of Mathematics and Computer Science at Clarkson University (1971–79), the Applied Mathematics Programme at the University of Arizona (1981–85), the Department of Mathematics at the University of Arizona (1985– 1996), the Department of Mathematics at the University of Warwick (1996– 2000). Alan C. Newell did this while at the same time maintaining active teaching (from large lecture undergraduate courses to graduate level courses) and research profiles (publications, external funding, invited lectures) and a record of all round scholarship.

Alan C. Newell has made groundbreaking contributions to diverse subjects in applied mathematics and physics:

• Pattern Formation. Developed, with colleagues Whitehead, Cross, Passot, Ercolani, envelope and modulation equations describing the behaviors of pattern order parameters. (a) Investigated weak solutions of the regularized phase diffusion equation in two and three dimensions and a categorization of the canonical point and line defects. (b) demonstrated how, beginning only with translational and rotational symmetries, pattern forming systems can, under external stresses, undergo phase translations which produce objects analogous to quarks and leptons which share many of the fractional charge and main characteristics of the objects arising in the Standard Model. (c) A series of articles on plant patterns which show how many phyllotactic features can result from mechanistic models involving biochemical agents such as auxin and mechanical forces producing patterns which closely resemble observations and provide an intriguing contract to the algorithmic approaches of Douady and Couder.

• Nonlinear Waves and Solutions. Was one of the first (with Benney) to derive the nonlinear Schrödinger equation as the universal equation for nonlinear dispersive wave envelopes. Made significant contributions with colleagues (Ablowitz, Kaup, Segur, Flaschka, Ratiu) to integrable and near integrable systems and isomonodromic deformations. More recent interests have concentrated on understanding the effect that the introduction of a random medium has on the propagation of nonlinear waves. Using the self-induced transparency of optical pulses in inhomogeneously broadened media as a paradigm, he have investigated the dependence of the Anderson localization distance on wave amplitude and shape.

• Optics. Developed with colleagues (Aceves, McLaughlin, Moloney, Lega, L'vov, Wright) useful results in connection with nonlinear Snell's Laws, optical bistability and feedback, pattern formation in wide aperture lasers, eye damage due to lasers, and semiconductor lasers. With L’vov, investigated the role of finite flux (rather than Fermi-Dirac) equilibria of the fermionic quantum kinetic equation in enhancing laser output. As part of the MURI AFOSR grant, developed with Glasner, Koselik and Moloney the canonical equation for ultra-short pulse population.

• Wave Turbulence. Developed (with Benney) consistent derivation of wave turbulence closure relying on minimal a priori statistical assumptions. With Dyachenko, Pushkarev and Zakharov, wrote a much cited paper on optical turbulence where we introduced the notion of cycle of intermittency. Developed (with Nazarenko, Biven, Connaughton) conditions on the wavenumber ranges of validity of the Kolmogorov-Zakharov (KZ) spectra in order for the wave turbulence closure to hold. With Galtier, Nazarenko and Pouquet wrote highly cited paper on weak magnetohydrodynamic turbulence and discovered the finite capacity anomaly, later addressed for three-wave interactions in a paper with Connaughton, in which the spectral of turbulence systems are realized in a very curious manner. With Rumpf and Zakharov, solved the MMT conundrum in which an initially weakly nonlinear system relaxes not to a wave turbulence state dominated by a resonant waves but to one dominated by radiating, coherent structures. This led, in two review papers with Rumpf to several suggestions as to what a priori premises are required in order for the wave turbulence closure to be valid. With Zakharov, pointed out the central role which the generalized Phillips's spectrum may play in wave turbulence.

• Plasmas and Fluids. Developed with colleagues (Nazarenko, Rubenchik, Zakharov) useful results in connection with the use of nonlinear plasma properties to enhance communication with reentry space vehicles. With the same coauthors, investigated novel ways to improve drag reduction and flight characteristics of hypersonic vehicles.

• Coherent Structures. With Benno Rumpf, have developed an explanation for the appearance of robust, large and coherent structures in nonintegrable systems with modulational (self-focusing) instabilities and constrained by more than one conservation law. This result has widespread application. Suggested an approach towards developing an H-theorem for nonisolated systems with a consequence that coherent structures play a vital role in order to enable highly nonlinear systems to reach a statistically steady state.
