= Breaking and Entering (Williams novel) =

1988 novel by American writer Joy Williams

- First edition
- Author: Joy Williams
- Language: English
- Publisher: Vintage Books
- Publication date: 1988
- Publication place: United States
- Pages: 288

Breaking and Entering is a 1988 novel by American writer Joy Williams.

== Publication ==
The novel was published a decade after Williams' second novel, The Changeling. This gap occurred in part because of a negative review Williams received from The New York Times critic Anatole Broyard for her novel The Changeling.

== Reception ==
=== Critical reception ===
The novel received positive reviews at the time of publication, and has continued to receive praise in the following decades.

American author Paul Lisicky has said he "fell in love" with the book while attending graduate school and that it influenced his own novel, Lawnboy.

=== Academic interpretation ===
Zoltán Abádi-Nagy, writing in the Hungarian Journal of English and American Studies, grouped the novel with works by other American "minimalist" authors. These include Jay McInerney's novel Bright Lights, Big City, and Bret Easton Ellis' novel Less than Zero.
