= Matei Călinescu =

Romanian literary critic and professor

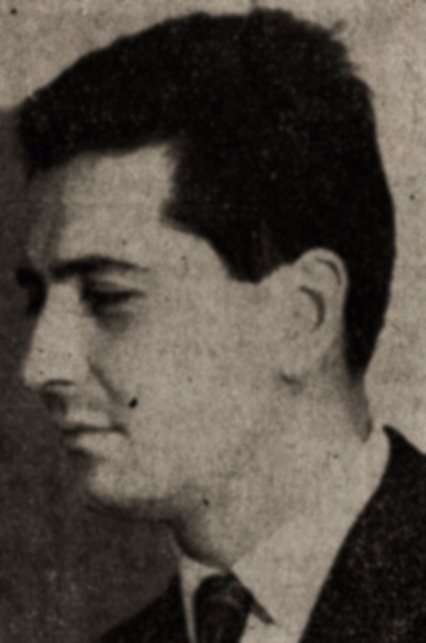
Călinescu in 1967

Matei Alexe Călinescu (June 15, 1934 – June 24, 2009) was a Romanian literary critic and professor of comparative literature at Indiana University, in Bloomington, Indiana.

== Biography ==
Călinescu was born in Bucharest, Romania, the son of Radu Călinescu, an engineer, and Dora Călinescu (née Vulcănescu), a homemaker. He attended the Ion Luca Caragiale High School in Bucharest, obtaining his diploma in 1952. He then pursued his studies at the University of Bucharest, graduating in 1957. Călinescu became an assistant professor in the Department of Universal and Comparative Literature at the University of Bucharest, and made his literary debut in Gazeta literară. He was offered a Fulbright grant and defected to the United States in 1973.

From 1973 to 1975 Călinescu was a visiting professor at Indiana University Bloomington, before becoming an associate professor there in 1976, and a full professor in 1978. He was awarded a Guggenheim Fellowship in 1975. He became a naturalized American citizen in 1980. Upon his retirement he became an Emeritus Professor at Indiana University. He lived with his wife in Bloomington, Indiana, and died there in 2009.

== Selected bibliography ==
- Matei Călinescu, Matthew's Enigma: A father's portrait of his autistic son., Bloomington, IN: Indiana University Press, 2009, 210 p. ISBN 978-0-253-22066-0
- Matei Călinescu, Eugène Ionesco: Teme identitare și existențiale (Eugène Ionesco: Identity and Existential Themes) Iași: Junimea, 2006, 491 p.
- Matei Călinescu, Ionesco: Recherches identitaires, Paris: Oxus, 2005, 348 p.
- Matei Călinescu, Un fel de jurnal, 1973–1981 (A Diary of Sorts, 1973–1981), Iași: Polirom, 2005.
- Matei Călinescu, Ion Vianu, Amintiri în dialog (Memories in Dialogue), Bucharest: Editura Litera, 1994; 2nd ed. with preface and two new chapters included as an Epilogue, Iași: Polirom, 1998; 3rd edition, Iași: Polirom, 2005.
- Matei Călinescu, Tu: Elegii și invenții (You: Elegies and Inventions, poems), Iași: Polirom, 2004.
- Matei Călinescu, Mateiu I. Caragiale: recitiri, Cluj: Biblioteca Apostrof, 2003, 160 p., 2nd ed., Cluj-Iași: Apostrof-Polirom, 2007.
- Matei Călinescu, Portretul lui M (The Portrait of M, a memoir), Iași: Polirom, 2003.
- Matei Călinescu, Rereading, New Haven: Yale University Press, 1993, 336 p. Translated into Romanian as A citi, a reciti. Către o poetică a (re)lecturii, Iași: Polirom, 2003. ISBN 0-300-05657-5
- Matei Călinescu, Despre Ioan P. Culianu și Mircea Eliade. Amintiri, Lecturi, Reflecții, Iași: Polirom, 2002, 177 p., 2nd ed., Iași: Polirom, 2002, 231 p.
- Vlad Georgescu, Matei Călinescu, The Romanians: a history, Ohio State University Press, 1991. ISBN 0-8142-0511-9
- Matei Călinescu, Exploring Postmodernism, (co-edited with Douwe W. Fokkema), Amsterdam and Philadelphia: John Benjamins, 1988, 270 p., Paperback edition, 1990.
- Matei Călinescu, Five Faces of Modernity: Modernism, Avant-Garde, Decadence, Kitsch, Postmodernism, Duke University Press, 1987. ISBN 0-8223-0767-7
- Matei Călinescu, Faces of Modernity: Avant-Garde, Decadence, Kitsch, Indiana University Press, 1977. ISBN 0-253-32087-9
- Matei Călinescu, Selections of Poetry translated into English in Mundus Artium, 1976; New Letters, 1976; Seneca Review, 1981; Correspondences, 1982; and 2 PLUS 2, 1983.
- Matei Călinescu, Umbre de apă, poeme, (Water Shadows, poems), Bucharest: Editura Cartea Românească, 1972.
- Matei Călinescu, Versuri (Lines), Bucharest: Editura Eminescu, 1970.
- Matei Călinescu, Viața și opiniile lui Zacharias Lichter (The Life and Opinions of Zacharias Lichter), a short novel, Bucharest: Editura Pentru Literatură, 1969. Translated into Hungarian, 1971; Polish, 1972; French excerpts, in Cahiers de l'Est, 1, 2, 1975; and English, 2018. 2nd ed., enlarged, Bucharest: Editura Eminescu, 1971; 3rd ed., with new preface, 1995, Iași: Polirom, 1995; 4th edition, Iași: Polirom, 2004.

== Awards ==
- 1969: Romanian Writers' Union Prize for Fiction, for Viața și opiniile lui Zacharias Lichter (The Life and Opinions of Zacharias Lichter)
- 1975: Guggenheim Fellowship
- 2006: Writers' Union Prize for Essay and Criticism, for Eugène Ionesco: Teme identitare și existențiale (Eugène Ionesco: Identity and Existential Themes)
