= The Quick and the Dead (novel) =

2000 novel by Joy Williams

- Author: Joy Williams
- Genre: Literary fiction
- Publisher: Knopf
- Publication date: October 17, 2000
- Pages: 320
- ISBN: 9780375727641

The Quick and the Dead is a 2000 novel by Joy Williams, published by Knopf. It was a finalist for the 2001 Pulitzer Prize for Fiction.

== Critical reception ==
NPR called the book "brisk, funny, uncanny" and lauded that Williams simultaneously "spares her characters no pain" yet is "deeply compassionate" toward them in writing: "It's ultimately a kind of love, this coldness. To gaze as she does, to remove layers of socialization, to show us the bizarreness beneath, we need a brilliant and detached guide."

The New York Times lauded that "William's language runs with virtuosity across a wide range, from dead-on vernacular to the gorgeously, unabashed oracular" but found that even her gift for language couldn't salvage the book's lack of adequate structure. January Magazine similarly found that "On the prose level, she elucidates complicated ideas deftly, but structurally, the novel is rough."

Conversely, Publishers Weekly noted the book's "episodic meandering structure" and its ending "without much resolution" but considered these as "deliberate choices, made by an artist attentive to real people's psyches—and to how even our smallest decisions matter to others in ways we may never know."

In 2019, The New Yorker observed the book's critiques of performative activism, revisiting it in wake of the Donald Trump 2016 presidential campaign.
