= The Pelican Child =

2025 short story collection by Joy Williams

- First edition cover
- Author: Joy Williams
- Publisher: Alfred A. Knopf
- Publication date: November 18, 2025
- Pages: 176
- ISBN: 9780525657583

The Pelican Child is a 2025 short story collection by Joy Williams. It received positive reception from critics upon release.

== Overview ==
The collection consists of twelve short stories previously published by Joy Williams in different journals. The oldest story was published in 2010.

== Development history ==
=== Publication history ===
The Pelican Child was published in the United States by Alfred A. Knopf on November 18, 2025.

== Reception ==
The Pelican Child received positive reception from critics upon release. Alta published a positive review that described the collection as expanding on similar themes from Williams' previous work. The Los Angeles Review of Books described the stories as "bleaker than ever" in a review that positively compared her writing to that of Bret Easton Ellis and Carson McCullers. The New York Times qualified its review, describing the stories as "uneven" and noting the presence of talking dogs in several of the stories.

The Washington Post, meanwhile, described the collection as Williams' "best book since The Quick and The Dead" and complimented her character descriptions. Kirkus Reviews was laudatory, praising Williams' prose and describing the collection as "yet more evidence that Williams should be next in line for the Nobel Prize in Literature." Publishers Weekly wrote a starred review that complimented Williams' dialogue and the stories for their consistent theme of mortality. Booklist was similarly positive.

The collection was longlisted for the 2025 National Book Award.
