= The Visiting Privilege =

2015 short story collection by Joy Williams

The Visiting Privilege: New and Collected Stories
- Author: Joy Williams
- Publisher: Knopf
- Publication date: September 8, 2015
- Pages: 512
- ISBN: 978-1101874899

The Visiting Privilege: New and Collected Stories is a 2015 short story collection by Joy Williams, published by Vintage. Its short stories span forty years of writing.

== Critical reception ==
The New York Times lauded Williams' scrutiny of the human species' "crimes against the planet," as well as her humor, and stated that "if Williams herself keeps writing fiction—ruthless, hilarious work that holds our human folly to the fire—the novel and the short story won’t perish anytime soon."

The Guardian stated that "Williams displays the observational sensitivity and subtleness of less wayward masters of the genre."

NPR concluded that "Williams is a flawless writer, and The Visiting Privilege is a perfect book, probably the best short story collection to come out in several years."

Slate observed: "This is a decades-long stack of stories about people whose balance may never again tippy-toe on the ocean floor...A big book of aphorisms without morals, these are stories populated by a huge number of attractive dogs who do not fulfill their owners' happiness, by a truckbed’s worth of murdered cats."

The Washington Post stated that "[Williams'] stories begin realistically enough, then permute into hallucinatory fairy tales, as grim as anything in Grimm, but also grimly funny."

SFGate lauded Williams' craft, stating that "So distilled and sure are Williams' sentences that at first I only wanted to scribble 'oh!' in the margins. Seamlessly linked, precise, forceful, they spear the reading ear, piercing to hard, weird truth."

Library Journal prefaced its review by saying that "Williams's award-winning fiction isn't for everyone" but found that the short stories included in the book could "attract new readers" through her examination of the human species.
