= Escapes (short story collection) =

1989 short story collection by Joy Williams

- Author: Joy Williams
- Genre: Literary fiction
- Publication date: January 25, 1989
- Pages: 168
- ISBN: 9780679733317

Escapes is a 1989 short story collection by Joy Williams, published by Atlantic Monthly Press. Williams' included short story of the same name was published in Granta in 1986.

== Critical reception ==
Los Angeles Times stated that "Williams' strength is in her purity of writing, her elegant melancholia," calling her a "gorgeous writer and a master of the short story," and found lots of "elegant agony, Joan Didion agony" in her pieces.

Publishers Weekly found "in these 12 observant tales—many about sickness, lies and death—the subtle but stunning moments of recognition and/or adjustment that occur during precarious dealings between lovers or spouses, parents and offspring."
