= John von Neumann Prize =

Mathematics award

- Awarded for: outstanding contributions to applied mathematical sciences and for effective communication of these ideas to the community
- Country: United States
- Presented by: Society for Industrial and Applied Mathematics
- Reward: US$5,000
- First award: 1960; 66 years ago
- Website: www.siam.org/prizes/sponsored/vonneumann.php

The John von Neumann Prize (until 2019 named John von Neumann Lecture Prize) was funded in 1959 with support from IBM and other industry corporations, and began being awarded in 1960 for "outstanding and distinguished contributions to the field of applied mathematical sciences and for the effective communication of these ideas to the community". It is considered the highest honor bestowed by the Society for Industrial and Applied Mathematics (SIAM). The recipient receives a monetary award and presents a survey lecture at the SIAM Annual Meeting.

== Selection process ==
Anybody is able to nominate a mathematician for the prize. Nominations are reviewed by a selection committee, consisting of members of SIAM who serve two-year appointments. The committee selects one recipient for the prize nine months before the SIAM Annual Meeting and forwards their nomination to SIAM's Executive Committee and Vice President for Programs.

== Past lecturers ==
- 1960: Lars Valerian Ahlfors
- 1961: Mark Kac
- 1962: Jean Leray
- 1963: Stanislaw M. Ulam
- 1964: Solomon Lefschetz
- 1965: Freeman Dyson
- 1966: Eugene P. Wigner
- 1967: Chia-Chiao Lin
- 1968: Peter D. Lax
- 1969: George F. Carrier
- 1970: James H. Wilkinson
- 1971: Paul A. Samuelson
- 1974: Jule Charney
- 1975: Sir James Lighthill
- 1976: René Thom
- 1977: Kenneth J. Arrow
- 1978: Peter Henrici
- 1979: Kurt O. Friedrichs
- 1980: Keith Stewartson
- 1981: Garrett Birkhoff
- 1982: David Slepian
- 1983: Joseph B. Keller
- 1984: Jürgen Moser
- 1985: John W. Tukey
- 1986: Jacques-Louis Lions
- 1987: Richard M. Karp
- 1988: Germund Dahlquist
- 1989: Stephen Smale
- 1990: Andrew J. Majda
- 1991: No award was made
- 1992: R. Tyrrell Rockafellar
- 1993: No award was made
- 1994: Martin D. Kruskal
- 1995: No award was made
- 1996: Carl de Boor
- 1997: William Kahan
- 1998: Olga Ladyzhenskaya
- 1999: Charles S. Peskin
- 2000: Persi Diaconis
- 2001: David L. Donoho
- 2002: Eric S. Lander
- 2003: Heinz-Otto Kreiss
- 2004: Alan C. Newell
- 2005: Jerrold E. Marsden
- 2006: George C. Papanicolaou
- 2007: Nancy Kopell
- 2008: David Gottlieb
- 2009: Franco Brezzi
- 2010: Bernd Sturmfels
- 2011: Ingrid Daubechies
- 2012: Sir John M. Ball
- 2013: Stanley J. Osher
- 2014: Leslie F. Greengard
- 2015: Jennifer Tour Chayes
- 2016: Donald E. Knuth
- 2017: Bernard J. Matkowsky
- 2018: Charles F. Van Loan
- 2019: Margaret H. Wright
- 2020: Nick Trefethen
- 2021: Chi-Wang Shu
- 2022: Leah Keshet
- 2023: Yousef Saad
- 2024: Jorge Nocedal
- 2025: Marsha Berger
- 2026: Mark Newman

== See also ==
- List of mathematics awards
