= Stanley Martin Flatté =

Stanley Martin Flatté (2 December 1940, Los Angeles – 4 November 2007) was a particle physicist and expert on wave propagation in atmospheric optics, ocean acoustics, and seismology.

== Biography ==
Flatté received in 1962 a B.S. in physics from California Institute of Technology and in 1966 a Ph.D. in physics from UC Berkeley. After 5 years as a research physicist at Lawrence Berkeley Laboratory, he joined in 1971 the UC Santa Cruz faculty, where he remained until his retirement in 2004. At UCSC he was affiliated with the Santa Cruz Institute for Particle Physics, the Institute of Marine Sciences, and the Institute of Geophysics and Planetary Physics. In 1970 he joined JASON.

In the area of particle physics, the Flatté Parametrization he developed is still used to describe the decay of certain kinds of mesons (fundamental particles made of quarks and antiquarks). Flatté's work on ocean acoustics began in the mid-1970s and continued for more than two decades. He helped develop a new paradigm in understanding sound transmission in the ocean. In the 1990s, he was involved in the Acoustic Thermometry of Ocean Climate (ATOC) experiment, which aimed to track the average temperature of the ocean using sound waves.In the area of atmospheric optics, Flatté studied the propagation of light waves through atmospheric turbulence. This work led to a collaboration with Claire Max, a pioneer in the field of adaptive optics for telescopes and now director of the Center for Adaptive Optics at UCSC and a professor of astronomy and astrophysics.In seismology, Flatté contributed to research on the scattering of seismic waves in the deep Earth. Geophysicist Ru-Shan Wu came to UCSC in 1986 to work with Flatté on scattering theory. Thorne Lay, professor of Earth and planetary sciences, said this collaboration led to the development by Wu of important techniques used by the oil exploration industry.

Upon his death, Flatté was survived by his wife, a son, a daughter, and six grandchildren.

== Awards and honors ==
- Guggenheim Fellow (academic year 1975–1976)
- Fellow of the Optical Society of America (elected 1996)
- Fellow of the American Physical Society (elected 1997)
- Fellow of the Acoustical Society of America
- Fellow of the American Association for the Advancement of Science
