= Joseph Beardsell =

English cricketer

Personal information
- Full name: Joseph Bentley Beardsell
- Born: 17 March 1907; Stockport, Lancashire, England
- Died: 13 January 1978 (aged 70); Madras, Tamil Nadu, India
- Batting: Unknown

Domestic team information
- Years: Team
- 1947/48: Europeans

Career statistics
Competition	First-class
Matches	1
Runs scored	16
Batting average	16.00
100s/50s	–/–
Top score	16
Catches/stumpings	–/–
- Source: ESPNcricinfo, 15 November 2021

Joseph Bentley Beardsell (17 March 1907 – 13 January 1978) was a first-class cricketer in India where he had emigrated to from England.

Beardsell was born at Stockport in March 1907. He was educated at Clifton College, before going up to Emmanuel College, Cambridge. After graduating from Oxford, he worked for the family company J. B. Beardsell Ltd in Manchester, before moving to British India in 1933 where he gained employment in Madras with another family company, W. A. Beardsell Ltd, which specialised in exports. He was a prominent rugby union player in Madras, playing in the All India Rugby Tournament for Madras Rugby Club from 1933 to 1935. Beardsell was a captain in the Indian Auxiliary Force by the time of the Second World War, with him being commissioned into the Royal Artillery during the war as a second lieutenant in November 1941. He remained in India following the end of the war in 1945 and subsequent Indian independence in 1947. Beardsell played first-class cricket for the Europeans cricket team in January 1948 against the Indians in the Madras Presidency Match; this match was to be the Europeans final appearance in first-class cricket. Batting once, he was dismissed in the Europeans first innings for 16 runs by K. S. Kannan. He later worked as a commercial manager for the Madras Electrical Supply Corporation and the Madras Electric Tramways. Beardsell died at Madras in January 1978.
