= Malcolm Diamond =

Malcolm Luria Diamond (November 6, 1924 – December 27, 1997) was William H. Danforth Professor of Religion, Emeritus, at Princeton University.

== Career ==
Diamond was born November 6, 1924, in New York City. During World War II, Diamond served in the U.S. Navy and was deployed to the South Pacific. He received a bachelor's degree in metallurgical engineering from Yale University in 1945 and a Ph.D. in philosophy and religion from Columbia University in 1956. He also studied at the Yale Divinity School in 1946-47 and at Trinity College, Cambridge, during 1947-48. He later earned an Ed.S. in family therapy from Seton Hall University in 1985.

A known civil rights activist, Diamond was among those to join the 1965 Selma to Montgomery Marches during the Civil Rights Movement. He was also an outspoken critic of war and participated in several anti-war demonstrations in the Northeast. Before being appointed to the Danforth chair at Princeton, Diamond had taught at several colleges including Sarah Lawrence College and New York University. Diamond also served on the executive committee of the American Academy of Religion. Professor Diamond died at the age of 73 after a long struggle with multiple myeloma.

== Works ==
After joining the Princeton faculty in 1953, Professor Diamond was the author of several books on philosophy and religion including Contemporary Philosophy and Religious Thought, Martin Buber: Jewish Existentialist, and The Logic of God: Theology and Verification.

== Sources ==
- Princeton University Obituary
- TIME on Civil Rights
