= Paul Mogensen =

Paul Mogensen (born 1941) is an American abstract artist. One source relates "he is a decorative painter as well a painter of a philosophical disposition." He is associated with geometric abstraction and minimalism.
