= Fred Huffman Wilt =

American biologist

Fred Huffman Wilt is an American biologist who was elected a Fellow of the American Association for the Advancement of Science. His research currently includes the endoskeletal spicule of sea urchin embryos, and its biomineralization relative to its cellular and molecular foundation.

== Selected publications ==
- The sea urchin (Strongylocentrotus purpuratus) spicule proteome. [K. Mann, A.J. Poustka, F.H.Wilt, (2010)Proteome Sci. 8:33]
- SpSM30 Gene Family Expression Patterns in Embryonic and Adult Biomineralized Tissues of the Sea Urchin, Strongylocentrotus purpuratus. [C.E. Killian, L. Croker, F.H. Wilt (2010) Gene Express. Patt. I0, 135-139]
- The Dynamics of secretion during sea urchin embryonic skeleton formation. [F.H.Wilt, C. Killian, P. Hamilton, and L Croker ( 2008) Exp. Cell Res. 314, 1744-1752]
- Morphogenesis and biomineralization of the sea urchin larval endoskeleton. [ F.H. Wilt and C.E. Ettensohn (2007) Handbook of Biomineralization (E.Bauerlein, Edit) Wiley-VCH, pp. 183–210]
- A genome-wide analysis of biomineralization-related proteins in the sea urchin Strongylocentrotus purpuratus. [B. Livingston, C. Killian, F. Wilt et al. (2006) Dev. Biol. 300,335-348]
- Developmental Biology meets Materials Science: Morphogenesis of biomineralized structures. [F.Wilt ( 2005) Dev. Biol. 280, 15-25]
- The transient phase of amorphous calcium carbonate in sea urchin larval spicules: the involvement of protein and magnesium in its formation and stabilization. [S. Raz, P.C. Hamilton, F. H. Wilt, S. Weiner and L. Addadi ( 2003) Adv. Funct. Mater. 13, 1-8]
