= Norman E. Whitten =

American cultural anthropologist (born 1937)

Norman E. Whitten, Jr.
- Born: May 23, 1937 (age 89); Orange, New Jersey
- Occupations: Anthropologist, academic, and author
- Awards: John Simon Guggenheim Memorial Foundation Fellowship; Beckman Institute Research Award; Research Award, Spurlock Museum

Academic background
- Education: Colgate University; University of North Carolina at Chapel Hill

Academic work
- Institutions: Washington University in St. Louis; University of Illinois Urbana-Champaign

Norman E. Whitten Jr. (born May 23, 1937) is an American cultural anthropologist who is professor emeritus of anthropology and Latin American studies at the University of Illinois Urbana-Champaign, and curator of the Spurlock Museum of World Cultures. He is known for books based on his anthropological field work and his research on the Afro-Latin and Indigenous peoples of the West Coast rainforest and upper Amazon Rain forest, most notably the Black population and Canelos Quichua and Achuar Peoples.

Whitten is the author and editor of several books, including Patterns Through Time: An Ethnographer's Quest and Journey, Histories of the Present: People and Power in Ecuador, From Myth to Creation: Art from Amazonian Ecuador, Puyo Runa: Imagery and Power in Modern Amazonia, and Millennial Ecuador: Critical Essays on Cultural Transformations and Social Dynamics. Working in Ecuador since 1961, Whitten and his wife, Dorothea Scott Whitten (1930–2011), has cofounded the Sacha Runa Research Foundation, a non-profit organization to support research among ethnically identifiable peoples of Ecuador, and to promote recognition of aesthetic values and cultural traditions of these peoples. Whitten is a Fellow of American Anthropological Association, Society of Cultural Anthropologists, Royal Anthropological Institute of Great Britain and Ireland, American Association for the Advancement of Science, and Society for Applied Anthropology. He edited the Journal American Ethnologist for five years, and the book series Interpretations of Culture in the New Millennium for over twenty years, and together with Dorothea, he has organized museum exhibitions in North and South America, including a permanent exhibit of over 450 objects at the University of Illinois's Spurlock Museum of World Cultures.

== Early life and education ==
Whitten was born in 1937 in Orange, New Jersey. He graduated from Colgate University in 1959 with a Bachelor of Science in anthropology and sociology. He then enrolled at the University of North Carolina at Chapel Hill, and earned his Master's and Doctoral degrees in anthropology in 1961 and 1964, respectively.

== Career ==
Whitten started his academic career in 1964 as an acting assistant professor at the University of North Carolina, Chapel Hill. In 1964, he was a research fellow at Tulane University working through the International Center for Medical Research and Training in Cali, Colombia. In the following year, he held an appointment at Washington University in St. Louis, as an assistant professor, and was promoted to associate professor from 1968 till 1970. During this time period, he was also concurrently appointed as a visiting associate professor at University of California, Los Angeles in 1979–70. In 1970, he joined the University of Illinois Urbana-Champaign as an associate professor, and then was promoted to professor in 1973, and became professor of Latin American studies in 1987. Between 1988 and 1992, he served there as a professor of campus honors. He also served as an adjunct professor of anthropology and international studies at the Universidad San Francisco de Quito (Ecuador) and has served on its board of trustees since 2006.

During his tenure at the University of Illinois, Whitten was the department head of anthropology from 1983 to 1986, and the director of the Center for Latin American and Caribbean Studies from 2000 till 2003. He has been serving as a curator for the Spurlock Museum of World Cultures since 1998.

Whitten is on the board of trustees for Universidad San Francisco de Quito—US (Miami) extension. In 1966, he was appointed as a chairman of the American Anthropological Association subcommittee on ethics and international research for Ecuador and Colombia. From 1967 to 1975, he was elected to the executive board of Central States Anthropological Society, and also served as president of the society, and program chairman of Central States Anthropological Meetings (Cleveland).

== Works ==
Whitten's earlier research career was focused primarily on performing ethnographic studies with African American peoples in North Carolina, Nova Scotia (Canada), Ecuador and Colombia, endeavoring to expand the range of African American studies. From 1968 through 2019, he along with his wife, (until she died in 2011) did ethnographic research in the Upper Amazonian region of Ecuador, with the Indigenous Canelos Quichua and Achuar Jivaroan people, focusing particularly on their cultural systems in contexts of radical transformations stemming from forces of the national political-economic system. Publications on Upper Amazonian peoples include areas of social structure, cultural ecology, and cosmology.

Whitten has published many books and essays on topics related to social organization, power structure and dynamics, ethnoaesthetics, and cultural imagery. He also works to explore cultural transformations, national development, ethnic-bloc formation, millennial movements, political democracy and social movements in the context of South America and African Diaspora. His book, titled Class, Kinship and Power in an Ecuadorian Town: The Negroes of San Lorenzo describes the social life of a black community in the town of San Lorenzo, while highlighting its transition from traditional culture to rationalized society. Julian Pitt-Rivers considers the book to be an "excellent work in itself" which not only to entails "the conversion of an agricultural and fishing community into a railhead and port," but also tends to discuss "the arrival of a large number of highlanders..." An American anthropologist Marvin Harris is of the view that Whitten's choice of a significant subject matter in the book "obscures the pioneering nature of the research here reported on, for there are no studies available which could provide a baseline literature." William F. Sharp, reflecting on another of Whitten's book Black Frontiersmen: A South American Case in Hispanic American Historical Review wrote that the book is "rich in descriptive detail concerning black frontiersmen in western Colombia and northwestern Ecuador."

In his book Sicuanga Runa: The Other Side of Development in Amazonian Ecuador, Whitten examined the impacts of national development policy on a group of Quichua- and Achuar-speaking Indigenous people. Michael T. Hamerly regarded the book as a "significant work" which is solely based on ethnographic observation of and interaction with Canelos and other Indian groups of the upper Amazon. While commenting on the linguistic aspects of the book, Hamerly stated that the author of the book seems to address himself mostly to "his colleagues, advocates and critics of structuralism, notwithstanding his claim that he wrote Sicuanga runa for nonspecialists." In his memoir Patterns Through Time: An Ethnographer's Quest and Journey, Whitten narrates his journey of life through many different perspectives, expanding research foci, and a wide range of professional influences. According to Karl H. Schwerin, this biographical memoir seems to be the "tracing of the circuitous theoretical trajectory."

Whitten edited five volumes of the American Ethnologist (Volumes 7–11) that included four special issues. From 2002 he has edited the book series for the University of Illinois Press Interpretations of Culture in the Millennium,.

== Personal ==
Whitten currently resides in Urbana, Illinois, USA. While studying at the University of North Carolina at Chapel Hill, he met Dorothea (Sibby) Scott, a master's student in sociology. The two married on August 2, 1962, and have no children together. Scott died on August 8, 2011.

== Awards and honors ==
- 1966 – John Simon Guggenheim Memorial Foundation Fellowship
- 1966 – New Jersey Teachers' Association Author's Award in Anthropology. Society of Sigma Xi. Who's Who in the Midwest. International Authors and Writers. Who's Who Contemporary Authors. The Writers Directory. Who's Who In America. Who's Who in the Social Sciences. Senior University Scholar, UIUC
- 1979 – "Study in a Second Discipline" award, University of Illinois
- 1987 – Hewlett Award in International Studies, UIUC
- 1978 – Wenner Gren Foundation for Anthoroplogical Research Grant
- 1994–95, 1996–97 – Beckman Institute Research Award
- 2000 – LAS Special Travel Award
- 2000–2003 – Research Award, Center for Latin American and Caribbean Studies
- 2002 – Research Award, Spurlock Museum
- 2000, 2003 – Major Institutional: principal author and PI of US/ED Title VI-FLAS awards to Center for Latin American and Caribbean Studies, UIUC
- 2001, 2003 – Author and PI of Tinker Foundation Awards to Center for Latin American and Caribbean Studies, UIUC
- 2003 – Graduate College Outstanding Mentor Award, UIUC
- 2011 – Named Gallery in the Spurlock Museum: "The Dorothea S. and Norman E. Whitten Gallery of South American People," to become "The Dorothea S. and Norman E. Whitten Gallery of Central and South American People"
- 2018 – The Society for the Anthropology of Lowland South America (SALSA) honored me as "lifetime member"
- 20202021 – Nominated for the Franz Boas Distinguished service award

== Selected exhibitions ==
In recognition of contributions of Whitten, and his late wife, in the field of anthropology/ethnology, a named gallery in the Spurlock Museum was renamed to The Dorothea S. and Norman E. Whitten Gallery of Central and South American People in 2012. Major exhibitions organized by Witten are as follows:

- "Art and Technology from Ecuador's Rainforest," Museum of Science and Natural History, St. Louis, Mo., February 12 ––April 10, 1978.
- "Art and Technology from Ecuador's Rainforest," State Historical Building, Madison, Wisconsin, in conjunction with the second symposium Amazonia: Extinction or Survival?, University of Wisconsin, April 17–24, 1978.
- "Amazonian Ceramics from Ecuador," University Gallery, University of Florida, Gainesville, April 13 –May 25, 1980..
- "Amazonian Ceramics from Ecuador," University Museum Gallery, Southern Illinois University-Carbondale, March 1–31, 1982.
- "Yachaj Awashka: Master Arts of Amazonian Ecuador," Logan Museum of Anthropology, Beloit College, Beloit, Wisconsin, March 15, 1984 – January 15, 1985.
- "¡Causaunchimi!: Arte, Cultura y Poder de los Canelos Quichua de la Amazonía Ecuatoriana" Galería de Arte del Banco Central del Ecuador, 10 March – 20 May 1987. Facsimile Exhibit opened in Lima, Peru, 16 August 1987 and returned to Ecuador in November 1987.
- "From Myth to Creation: Art from Amazonian Ecuador." Krannert Art Museum, UIUC, 16 April 1988 – 22 May 1988. Funded by 23 UIUC units and Illinois Humanities Council.
- "‘. . . To a Remarkable Degree of Perfection': Amazonian Ceramics from Ecuador." University of Illinois "I-Space" Gallery, Chicago, Illinois. 26 March –26 April 1993.
- "We Are Living! Causaúchimi! " Permanent exhibition. Gallery of the Americas. Spurlock Museum of World Cultures. Opened September 2002. Redesigned 2008–2010. Rededicated, 2011. To be expanded to include Middle-American Mayan textiles, 2014.
- "Rain Forest Visions" Temporary Exhibition in the Campbell Gallery of the Spurlock Museum. February 28 –August 20, 2006. Five gallery tours and three lectures accompanied exhibit.

== Bibliography ==
=== Books ===
- From Myth to Creation: Art from Amazonian Ecuador (1988) ISBN 9780252060205
- Class, Kinship, and Power in an Ecuadorian town: The Negroes of San Lorenzo (1965) ISBN 9780804700870
- Black Frontiersmen: A South American Case (1974) ISBN 9780470941263
- Ecuadorian Ethnocide and Indigenous Ethnogenesis: Amazonian Resurgence Amidst Andean Colonialism (1976)
- Sacha Runa: Ethnicity and Adaptation of Ecuadorian Jungle Quichua (1976) ISBN 9780252005534
- Amazonian Ecuador: An Ethnic Interface in Ecological, Social and Ideological Perspectives (1978)
- The Electoral Process in Nicaragua: Domestic and International Influences (1984)
- Sicuanga Runa: The Other Side of Development in Amazonian Ecuador (1985) ISBN 9780252011177
- Black Frontiersmen: Afro-Hispanic Culture of Ecuador and Colombia (1986) ISBN 9780881331998
- Arte, cultura y poder de los canelos quichua de la Amazonía ecuatoriana (1987)
- Sacha Runa: etnicidad y adaptación de los Quichua hablantes de la amazonía ecuatoriana (1987) ISBN 9780252005534
- Pioneros negros : la cultura afro-latinoamericana del Ecuador y de Colombia (1992) ISBN 9780881331998
- Clase, Parentesco y Poder en un Pueblo Ecuatoriano: Los Negros de San Lorenzo (1997)
- Puyo Runa: Imagery and Power in Modern Amazonia (2008) ISBN 9780252074790
- Histories of the Present: People and Power in Ecuador (2011) ISBN 9780252077975
- From Myth to Creation: Art from Amazonian Ecuador, 2nd edition (2016) ISBN 9780252081934
- Patterns Through Time: An Ethnographer's Quest and Journey (2017) ISBN 9781907774881

=== Selected articles ===
- Whitten, Norman E. (November 2007). "The Longue Durée of Racial Fixity and the Transformative Conjunctures of Racial Blending". Journal of Latin American and Caribbean Anthropology. 12 (2): 356–383. doi:10.1525/jlat.2007.12.2.356.
- Whitten, Norman (June 2008). "Interculturality and the Indigenization of Modernity: A View from Amazonian Ecuador". Tipití. 6 (1).
