= Lorena Mirambell =

Mexican archaeologist (1935–2025)

- Born: 15 March 1935; Mexico City, Mexico
- Died: 1 November 2025 (aged 90)
- Occupation: Archaeologist
- Awards: Guggenheim Fellowship (1975); Ordre des Palmes académiques

Academic background
- Education: Instituto Nacional de Antropología e Historia; University of Bordeaux 1; UCL Institute of Archaeology

Academic work
- Discipline: Archaeology
- Sub-discipline: Prehistory
- Institutions: Instituto Nacional de Antropología e Historia

Lorena Emilia Mirambell y Silva (15 March 1935 – 1 November 2025) was a Mexican archaeologist who specialised in prehistory in Mexico. A 1975 Guggenheim Fellow, she was researcher emeritus of Instituto Nacional de Antropología e Historia and was president of the Council of Archaeology from 1989 to 1992.

== Life and career ==
Mirambell was born in Mexico City on 15 March 1935. She joined the Instituto Nacional de Antropología e Historia (INAH), where she in 1963 obtained her master's degree in anthropological sciences and became a researcher. She later studied in Europe, where she obtained her prehistory certificate on a scholarship at the University of Bordeaux 1 in 1966 and studied environmental geology at the UCL Institute of Archaeology in 1969.

Later returning to INAH, Mirambell worked there as coordinator of the prehistoric archaeology (1966–1968) and the laboratories section (1969–1972), before serving again in the former position from 1971 to 1974. She was later head of INAH's prehistoric department by 1988. She later served as president of the federal government's Council of Archaeology from 1989 to 1992. In 2015, she was appointed researcher emeritus at INAH.

Mirambell's academic work focuses on prehistory, including the Late Pleistocene era. In 1967, she was sent to the Tlapacoya archaeological site to lead an excavation, where it was confirmed by radiometric dating that humans lived in the Americas circa 24,000 BP. El Universal called this and other visits to Pleistocene paleontological sites like Rancho La Amapola "a watershed for prehistory in Mexico". Other contributions include the methodology of stone tools - a study for which she was appointed a Guggenheim Fellow in 1975 - including from places like East Asia, Indonesia, and Australia. She was also awarded the Ordre des Palmes académiques for her work on prehistory. In June 2018, INAH's Subdirectorate of Laboratories and Academic Support organized a colloquium in her honour, hosted by INAH head Diego Prieto Hernández.

Mirambell and her mentor José Luis Lorenzo Bautista later became close after his wife's death.

Mirambell died on 1 November 2025, at the age of 90.
