= Joy Williams (American writer) =

American novelist and short story writer

- Williams at the Library of Congress in 2021
- Born: February 11, 1944 (age 82); Chelmsford, Massachusetts, U.S.
- Education: Marietta College (BA); University of Iowa (MFA)
- Occupations: Novelist; short story writer; essayist
- Writing career
- Period: 1973–present
- Genre: Literary fiction

Joy Williams (born February 11, 1944) is an American novelist, short-story writer, and essayist. Best-known for her short fiction, she is also the author of novels including State of Grace, The Quick and the Dead, and Harrow. Williams has received a Guggenheim Fellowship for Creative Arts, a Rea Award for the Short Story, a Kirkus Award for Fiction, and a Library of Congress Prize for American Fiction.

== Early life and education ==
Williams was born in Chelmsford, Massachusetts. She grew up in Maine and was an only child. Her father was a Congregational minister with a church in Portland, Maine, and her grandfather was a Welsh Baptist minister.

She received a BA from Marietta College and a MFA from the University of Iowa. At Iowa, Williams studied alongside Raymond Carver, Ronald Verlin Cassill, Vance Bourjaily, and Richard Yates. After graduating from Iowa, she married and moved to Florida, where she had a dog, a beach, and a Jaguar XK150. She wrote her first novel, State of Grace.

Williams has taught creative writing at the University of Houston, the University of Florida, the University of Iowa, and the University of Arizona. For the 2008-09 academic year, Williams was the writer-in-residence at the University of Wyoming, and she continued thereafter as an affiliated faculty member of the English department. She lives in Key West, Florida, and Tucson, Arizona.

Williams was married for 34 years to Rust Hills, fiction editor for Esquire, until his death on August 12, 2008.

== Career ==
Williams is the author of five novels. Her first novel, State of Grace (1973), was nominated for a National Book Award for Fiction, and her fourth novel, The Quick and the Dead (2000), was a finalist for the Pulitzer Prize for Fiction. Her first collection of short stories, Taking Care, was published in 1982. A second collection, Escapes, followed in 1990. A 2001 essay collection, Ill Nature: Rants and Reflections on Humanity and Other Animals, was a finalist for the National Book Critics Circle Award for Criticism. Honored Guest, a collection of short stories, was published in 2004. A 30th anniversary reprint of The Changeling was issued in 2008 with an introduction by the American novelist Rick Moody. The book was also republished in 2018 to celebrate 40 years from its original publication. Her most recent novel, Harrow, was published in September 2021.

Williams's stories and essays are frequently anthologized, and she has received many awards and honors, including the Harold and Mildred Strauss Living Award from the American Academy of Arts and Letters and the Rea Award for the Short Story. In 2008, she was elected as a member of the American Academy of Arts and Letters. In 2021, she received the Library of Congress Prize for American Fiction.

Williams's fiction often portrays life as a downward spiral, addressing various forms of failure in the USA from spiritual, ecological, and economic perspectives. Her characters, generally from the middle class, frequently fall from it, at times in bizarre fashion, in a form of cultural dispossession. Williams's adult characters are usually divorced, her children are abandoned, and their lives are consumed with fear, often irrational, such as the little girl in the story "The Excursion", who is terrified that birds will fly out of her toilet bowl. The critic Rosellen Brown has characterized the figures in Williams's work as seeming to be "born spiritually on the lam, living their clammy lives in a watery, vegetation-laden, untended-feeling place ... in ineffective shade." Critics have also said her work has elements of both minimalism and the Gothic.

In an introductory note in 1995's edition of Best American Short Stories, Williams wrote: "All art is about nothingness: our apprehension of it, our fear of it, its approach."

Williams is especially noted for her writing on the environment. In addition to her work Ill Nature, she is the author of a guidebook to the Florida Keys, which Condé Nast called "one of the best guidebooks ever written" and "a magnificent, tragicomic guide."

== Works ==
=== Novels ===
- State of Grace (1973)
- The Changeling (1978)
- Breaking and Entering (1988)
- The Quick and the Dead (2000)
- Harrow (2021)

=== Short fiction ===
Collections

- Taking Care (1982)
- Escapes (1990)
- Honored Guest (2004)
- The Visiting Privilege: New and Collected Stories (2015)
- 99 Stories of God (2016)
- Concerning the Future of Souls (2024)
- The Pelican Child (2025)

Uncollected stories

- "The Roomer," Carolina Quarterly (Winter 1965)
- "In Search of Boston," New Campus Writing 5 (1966)
- "The Retreat," The Paris Review 44 (Fall 1968)
- "2," Transatlantic Review 30 (Fall 1968)
- "Jefferson’s Bounty," The Paris Review 45 (Winter 1968)
- "Dr. Caligari Loves," Virginia Quarterly Review 45.3 (Summer 1969)
- "Dimmer," The Paris Review 48 (Fall 1969)

=== Nonfiction ===
- Ill Nature: Rants and Reflections on Humanity and Other Animals (essays) (2001)
- The Florida Keys: A History & Guide, illustrated by Robert Carawan (Tenth Edition) (2003)
