= Breaking and Entering: Music from the Film =

Soundtrack album by Underworld and Gabriel Yared
- Released: 6 November 2006 (UK); 5 December 2006 (United States)
- Recorded: 2006
- Studio: Abbey Road Studios, London
- Genre: Soundtrack
- Length: 57:13
- Label: V2 Records

US slipcover

Professional ratings
Review scores
Source	Rating
Tiny Mix Tapes	3.5/5 stars
Rockfeedback	4/5 stars
About.com	4.5/5 stars

Breaking and Entering: Music from the Film is the soundtrack album for the film Breaking and Entering and was released by V2 Records on 6 November 2006, almost two months before the film's theatrical release in the U.S. The musical score is the result of a collaboration between Underworld and Gabriel Yared.

== Track listing ==
1. "A Thing Happens"
2. "St Pancras"
3. "Sad Amira"
4. "Monkey One"
5. "Not Talking"
6. "Hungerford Bridge"
7. "We Love Bea"
8. "Happy Toast"
9. "Monkey Two"
10. "Will and Amira"
11. "Primrose Hill"
12. "So-ree"
13. "Mending Things"
14. "Broken Entered"
15. "Piano Modal"
16. "Counterpoint Hang Pulse"
17. "JAL to Tokyo: Riverrun Version" (Japan Bonus Track)

Sigur Rós song "Sé lest" is heard during the credits, however the song does not appear on the soundtrack.
