= Leslie Brisman =

American literary scholar

Leslie Brisman is Karl Young Professor of English at Yale University. Brisman is known for their view that the Bible's book of "Genesis" is a conversation between two different voices, referred to as Jacob and Eisaac, rather than the common belief that it's a combination of multiple different earlier writings.

== Selected publications ==
- Milton’s Poetry of Choice (1973)
- Romantic Origins (1978)
- The Voice of Jacob. Indiana University Press, Bloomington, 1990. ISBN 0253312647
