= Jeffery Beardsall =

English artist and painter

- Born: 23 October 1940; Hereford, England
- Died: 17 May 2015 (aged 74); Stuttgart, Germany
- Occupations: artist and painter

Jeffery Francis Beardsall (23 October 1940 – 17 May 2015) was an English artist and painter. He was recipient of a John Simon Guggenheim Fellowship in 1975.

== Awards and prizes ==
- John S. Guggenheim Fellowship (USA)
- Print Making Award (England)
- Post Graduate Print Making Award (England)
- The Samuel Biggin Painting Prize (England)

His works are in museums including the Musée d'Art et d'Histoire, Whitney Museum of American Art, Staatsgalerie Stuttgart.

== Publications and literature ==
- Artist Proof, 1970
- The Print Collectors Newsletter, 1975, 1976, 1978
- SKY, 1976
- Art in America, Jan. 1980
- Grand Reportage, 1981
- Architectural Digest, 1975, 1983, 1984
