= William Arthur Coles =

Physicist

William Arthur Coles, from the University of California, San Diego, was awarded the status of Fellow in the American Physical Society, after they were nominated by their Topical Group in Plasma Astrophysics in 2006, for his major contributions to our understanding of the effect of plasma turbulence on radio wave propagation, and the use of radio propagation measurements to infer properties of remote turbulent plasmas in interplanetary space and the interstellar medium.

== See also ==
- List of fellows of the American Physical Society (1998–2010)
