= The Changeling (Joy Williams novel) =

1978 novel by Joy Williams

- The Changeling book jacket
- Author: Joy Williams
- Genre: Fiction / Fantasy / Dark Fantasy
- Set in: Florida, United States
- Published: 1978, 2008, 2018
- Publisher: Doubleday, Fairy Tale Review Press,, Tin House
- Publication place: United States
- Media type: Hardcover, Paperback, E-book
- Pages: 336
- ISBN: 9781941040898
- OCLC: 990288649
- Website: Official website; Tin House: Official website. Penguin Random House

The Changeling is a dark fantasy and fairy tale novel by Joy Williams published in 1978 by Doubleday. It was reprinted in a fortieth anniversary edition by Tin House Books with a introduction by Karen Russell. It was also previously republished in 2008 by Fairy Tale Review Press as its 30th anniversary edition with a new preface by Rick Moody.

== Plot ==
The novel opens with Pearl & her infant son, Sam, at a bar in Florida, fleeing her husband, Walker, and his wealthy family who reside on a remote island off the eastern seaboard of the United States. Her husband finds her in the bar & takes her & the child to the Miami airport so they can fly back to their island. The writer Tobias Carroll sums up the plot as ". . . a young woman marries the scion of a wealthy family, attempts to escape, and, after a tragic event, loses her sense of self under the controlling sway of the aforementioned family — as well as copious amounts of alcohol."
