= Gresta =

Gresta is a surname. Notable people with the surname include:

- Antonio Gresta (1671–1727), Italian painter
- Bibop Gresta (born Gabriele Gresta in 1971), Italian businessman
