= Quay Valley, California =

Proposed city in the United States

Coordinates: 35°47′40.29″N 119°47′6.76″W

Quay Valley was a proposed 75,000-resident solar power city in Kings County, California that was to have been developed by GROW Land and Water LLC (originally Kings County Ventures LLC), halfway between Los Angeles and San Francisco. In 2008, the developers of Quay Valley Ranch put the project on hold pending signs of an economic recovery. Planned as the largest new town in California on private land, as of April 2010, the Quay Valley project was tied up in litigation over water rights and it was unknown at that time if the project would move forward. In 2014, a court suit about water rights was settled in favor of the project; a new application for zoning was submitted in February 2015.

On December 6, 2017, The Kings County Community Development Department received a formal withdrawal of the application from Quay Hays for the Quay Valley project.

== Master plan ==
Quay Valley would have used clean and renewable energy generated from an on-site 600-megawatt power plant. As originally proposed, the city would have consisted of about 50,000 units on 12,000 acres (4,900 hectares) built over 25 years, housing approximately 150,000 residents, using solar power for electricity. An entertainment destination district, a medical center, theme parks and an international motor speedway complex were initially proposed. The project proposal was subsequently scaled down to 7,200 acres (2,900 ha), 25,000 dwelling units and 75,000 residents.

== Project history ==
The planned community was initially organized by over 250 Planning Team Members by Kings County Ventures LLC. In July 2007, the Quay Valley planning team established a 50-acre (20 ha) on-site research ranch to test numerous new methods and systems which will help determine what may work best for the build out of Quay Valley.

By April 2010, Kings County Ventures, LLC, the original project proponent, had been disbanded, but the partnership was still registered as active in California in 2015. Quay Hays' latest organization, GROW Land and Water LLC, filed a lawsuit in December 2009 in connection with the sale of land by McCarthy Family Farms to another party that included the attached water rights. Quay Valley proponents had planned to use that water for the proposed new city. California law requires that new cities demonstrate that they have sufficient water supplies to survive a five-year drought. Greg Gatzka, Director of the Kings County Community Development Agency, said in April 2010 that the application before his agency to build the project had been inactive for approximately a year and a half. Gaztka added that the project had yet to meet several key requirements in addition to the water issue, including a financial feasibility study and a detailed infrastructure plan. The scarcity of venture capital financing has been cited as another obstacle. Nonetheless, Quay Hays said that he remained interested in seeing the project happen.

On December 12, 2017, Greg Gatza, Kings County Director of Community Development, reported at a meeting of the Kings County Board of Supervisors that on December 6, 2017, his department had received a formal withdrawal from Quay Hays on the Quay Valley project.

== Resolution of water rights ==
On April 1, 2014, a Kings County jury awarded a $128.6 million verdict in favor of Kings County Ventures and GROW and against McCarthy Family Farms for breach of contract involving the sale of the water rights and against developer John Vidovich and Sandridge Partners for intentional interference of two contracts involving water for the Quay Valley Ranch project.

== Current status ==
In February 2015, Quay Hays submitted an application to the Kings County Community Development Department to rezone 7,500 acres (3,000 ha) for housing and commercial development at the site. The project comprises 25,000 dwelling units to house 75,000 people (half of the 150,000 proposed initially), plus themed resort hotels and restaurants, a business park and university research park, restored wetland habitat, trails for nature walks and agriculture in a combination described as the "new ruralism." Some features included in the original application, including a race track, have been deleted. As to water supply, Hays said that they have some state water rights and are working on acquiring more. He added that the project would use half the water that typically would be used due to water reuse. Greg Gatzka, the Kings County Community Development Agency director, said "there are a whole lot of questions that will have to be addressed."

In March 2015, Dirk Ahlborn, the CEO of Hyperloop Transportation Technologies (HTT) in El Segundo, California announced a plan to build a 5-mile (8-kilometer) hyperloop test system at the Quay Valley site. Ahlborn indicated that construction could begin in 2016 to be completed in 2017 with the first rides to begin in 2018 if his company can raise $100 million in funding. The company has said that this track will be a fully working and operational creation of the hyperloop, but that running speed will be reduced on the shortened track from Hyperloop's full potential. It is not decided whether a 5-mile loop or straight section will be constructed, and it may cross the Interstate bisecting the site. Ahlborn said that speeds up to 200 mph (320 km/h) may be possible. Quay Hays expects to break ground on the new community in 2016, including a working version of the Hyperloop, estimated to cost $100–150 million.

In March 2016, Hays submitted a Preliminary Design Plan for Quay Valley to the Kings County Community Development Agency.

On December 6, 2017, The Kings County Community Development Department received a formal withdrawal from Quay Hays of the application for the Quay Valley project, effectively terminating the proposal.
