= Fritz Hirsch =

German art historian

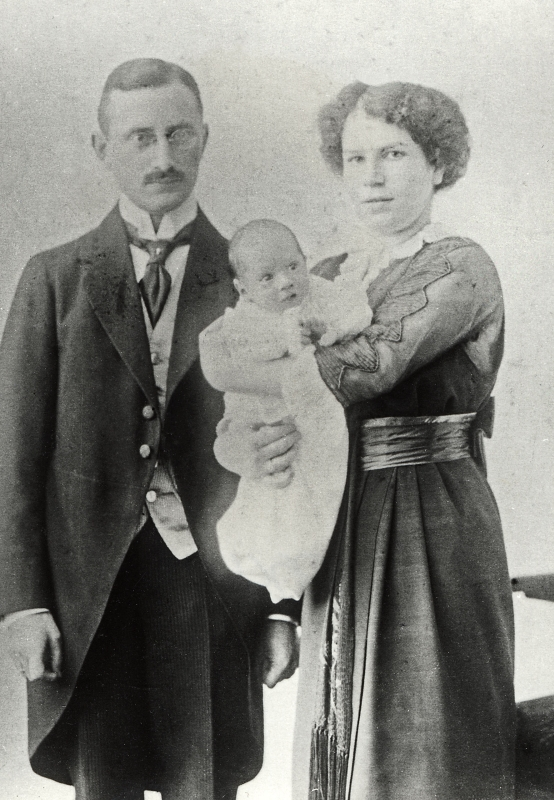
- Hirsch and his family, 1910
- Born: 21 April 1871; Konstanz
- Died: 18 July 1938 (aged 67); Baden-Baden
- Occupation: Art historian

Fritz Hirsch (21 April 1871 – 18 July 1938) was a German art historian, architect, and pioneer of state-sponsored historical preservation.

== Early life ==
Fritz Hirsh was born on 21 April 1871 in Konstanz, in the German Empire, to parents of Jewish descent.

== Education ==
Hirsch graduated from a Konstanz gymnasium in 1889 and then began studying art and architecture in Karlsruhe and Munich. Also in 1889, while in Karlsruhe, he joined the Karlsruher Burschenschaft Teutonia fraternity.

From 1895, he worked as an apprentice architect at the inspection offices of the Konstanz and Heidelberg districts. He received his doctorate in 1897 while in Heidelberg with a thesis on the Baroque sculptor Hans Morinck. In the same year, he took a teaching position at an architecture school in Lübeck.

== Career ==
In 1900, Hirsch became an assessor specializing in architecture for the government Heidelberg. Five years later, he was the district inspector for Bruchsal. From 1900 to 1909, he directed a restoration of Schloss Bruchsal and the nearby St. Peter's Church, a groundbreaking landmark in the field of historical preservation. In particular, Hirsch emphasized before anything else the value of accurate sources and documentation.

Hirsch was dismissed from all his positions in 1933 by the anti-Semitic Law for the Restoration of the Professional Civil Service.

== Honors ==
Hirsch was named an honorary citizen of the city of Schwetzingen and an honorary senator at the University of Freiburg.
