= Mormedi =

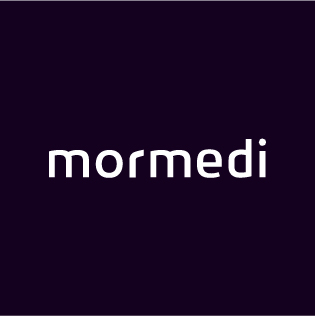
- Company type: Private
- Industry: Industry sectors: Airlines, Banking, Telecommunications, Consumer products, Home appliances, Transportation, Retail
- Founded: 1998
- Founder: Jaime Moreno
- Headquarters: Madrid, Spain
- Area served: Worldwide
- Key people: Jaime Moreno (CEO & Founder); Silvia Cebrian-Sagarriga (Operations Director)
- Number of employees: 25
- Website: www.mormedi.com

Mormedi is a strategic design and innovation consultancy founded in 1998 by Jaime Moreno. The company is headquartered in Madrid, with a presence in Mexico City and Tokyo. Moreno describes the company as a “global boutique” as the majority of the company’s clients are outside of Spain, with the EU, USA, Latin America, Japan, and Korea being major markets.

Mormedi offers services including service design, physical design (space and product design), digital innovation, business model innovation and strategic foresight.

The company is a multicultural team that includes anthropologists sociologists, business strategists, architects, product designers, service designers, UX/UI designers, engineers, marketeers, storytelling and branding specialists, as well as a network of international experts.

Mormedi’s work has received numerous design awards, including International Forum Design awards (iF), Red Dot, German Design Awards, and GOOD design awards.

In 2015, Jaime Moreno was awarded the highest design honour in Spain, the National Design Award.

== Evolution ==
Mormedi's roots lie in Industrial design but the company has expanded its capabilities and evolved to an integral offering that covers the whole process from strategy to implementation. Their core services include strategic design, industrial design, user interface, environmental design and transport.

== Designs and clients ==
The company focuses on the transportation and mobility, “connected services” (which includes IoT and digital touchpoints for brands), “connected spaces” (retail and commercial) and financial services sectors.

In mobility, the company designs integrated services and touchpoints across the physical and the digital. This has included Spain’s commuter rail stations (known as Cercanías), work in aviation for companies including Iberia and Airbus, the design of the cargo transport system for HyperloopTT, and the digital, service, and vehicle concept for an autonomous vehicle.

In connected services, Mormedi works with companies such as Mitsubishi Electric in Japan, LG Electronics in Korea, and regularly works with Telefónica across service design and has designed devices including the Movistar Home and Home Gateway Units.

In connected spaces, Mormedi has worked on retail store design for a number of fashion brands and duty-free stores, as well as automated and unmanned retail, redesigned the employee experience for BBVA, and worked on the branch experience for banks including Banco Pichincha and Banco Santander.

In financial services, the company has worked across Europe, the Middle East, Latin America, and Australia for clients including Banco Santander, BBVA, and Bankia.

== Corporate ==
Headquartered in Madrid Mormedi has representations in Asia and collaborates with a tight network of external experts.
