= Bruchsal Palace =

German palace

- Schloss Bruchsal
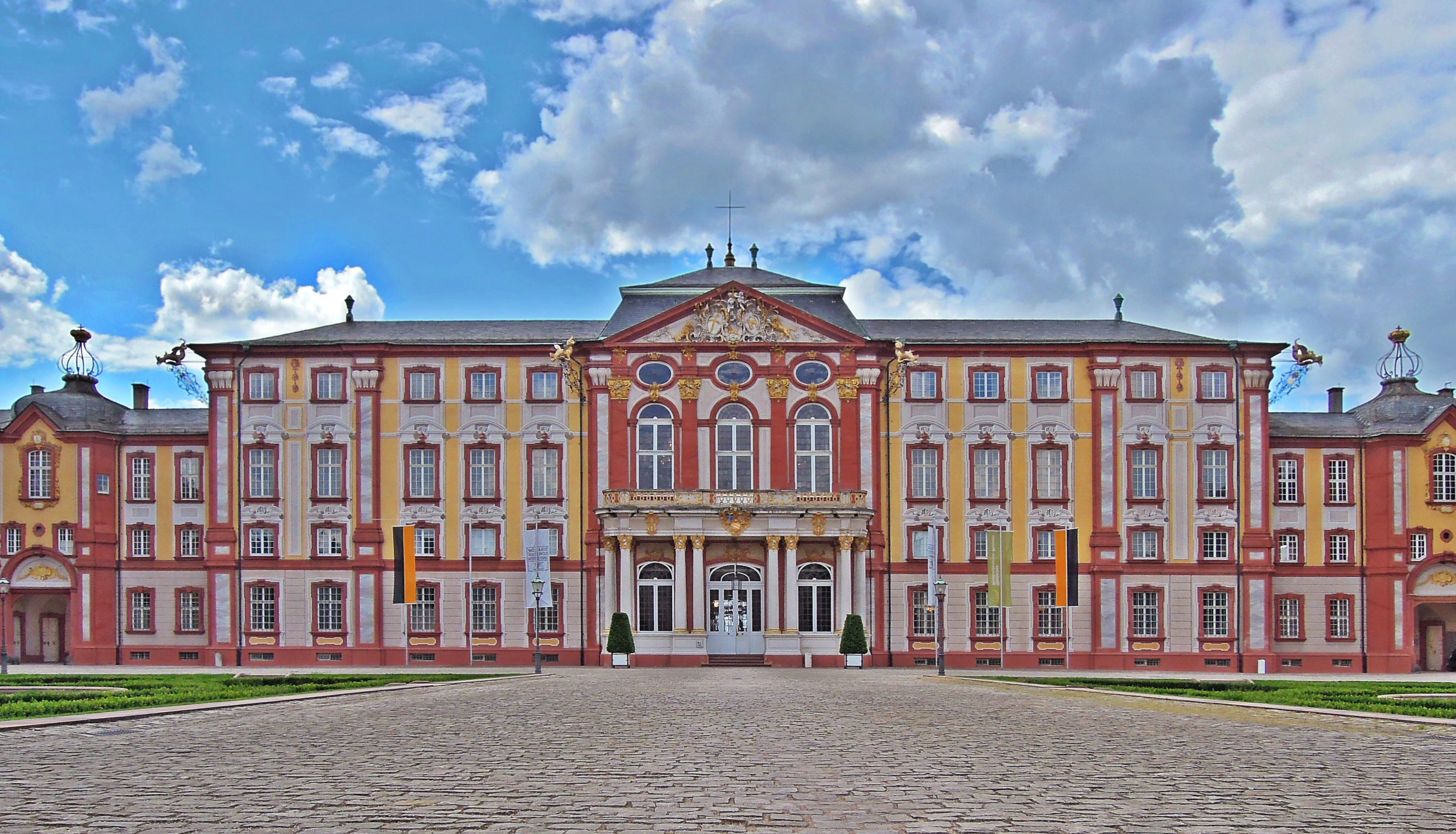
- Corps de logis from the cour d'honneur, looking northwest

Map and basic information
Location within Baden-Württemberg Location within Germany
General information
Location	Schloßraum 4, 76646; Bruchsal, Germany
- Coordinates: 49°7′43.3″N 8°35′55.5″E

Bruchsal Palace (German: Schloss Bruchsal), also called the Damiansburg, is a Baroque palace complex located in Bruchsal, Germany. The complex is made up of over 50 buildings. These include a three-winged residential building with an attached chapel, four pavilions separated by a road, some smaller utility buildings, and a garden. It is noted for its fine Rococo decoration and in particular its entrance staircase, which is regarded as one of the finest examples of its kind in any Baroque palace.

The palace was built in the first half of the 18th century by Damian Hugo Philipp von Schönborn, Prince-Bishop of Speyer. Schönborn drew on family connections to recruit building staff and experts in the Baroque style, most notably Balthasar Neumann. Although intended to be the permanent residence of the Prince-Bishops, they occupied it for less than a century.

On 1 March 1945, only two months before the end of the Second World War, much of the palace was destroyed in an American air raid directed against nearby railway installations. It has since been completely rebuilt in a restoration project that lasted until 1996. The interiors have been partly restored and the palace now houses two museums.

== History ==
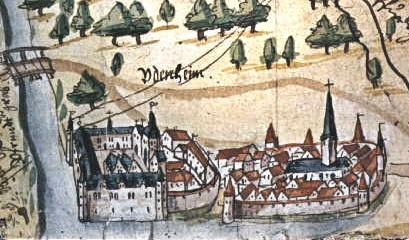
The Udenheim residence and castle at Philippsburg, 1590

For much of its existence, and that of the Holy Roman Empire, the city of Speyer was both an Imperial city and the seat of a Prince-Bishopric. The two entities quarreled throughout their own existences, but especially during the Reformation. As in some other German Bishopric seats, this conflict would force the Prince-Bishop to vacate the city. The secondary residence of the Prince-Bishops was the fortress of Udenheim, purchased by Prince-Bishop Emich von Leiningen in 1316. Prince-Bishop Philipp Christoph von Sötern renamed that residence to the Philippsburg and began fortifying it in 1617 following the formation of the Protestant Union. In response, and with permission from the Holy Roman Emperor, Frederick V, Elector Palatinate and a force from the Palatinate, Speyer, and Württemberg destroyed Philippsburg in June 1618.

During the Nine Years' War, French general Ezéchiel du Mas, Comte de Mélac attacked and destroyed the Philippsburg and then Speyer, on 1 June 1689, razing the city and the Episcopal Palace. Speyer's burghers were entirely unwilling to allow the reconstruction of ecclesiastical property and even violently prevented it in 1716. Prince-Bishop Heinrich Hartard von Rollingen moved his seat to Bruchsal and rebuilt a family residence located there. Rollingen's coadjutor bishop and successor in 1719, Damian Hugo Philipp von Schönborn, desired to rebuild the Episcopal Palace in Speyer. Damian Hugo was refused by the city, though by then he was taken by Bruchsal's landscape and decided to build a new palace north of the town's walls. He acquired the services of Maximilian von Welsch, court architect to his uncle, Lothar Franz von Schönborn, the Elector of Mainz, who was to work on the plans for Bruchsal Palace alongside Friedrich Karl von Schönborn, Damian Hugo's brother. Welsch presented plans for Bruchsal Palace to Damian Hugo in September 1720, while he was visiting his uncle's court at Schloss Favorite. Impressed, the Prince-Bishop approved the start of construction and in 1721 recruited Johann Georg Seitz, a foreman working for another Schönborn. The palace's cornerstone was laid on the north side of the cour d'honneur in what was to be the Chamber Wing (Kammerflügel) in 1722.

=== Construction ===
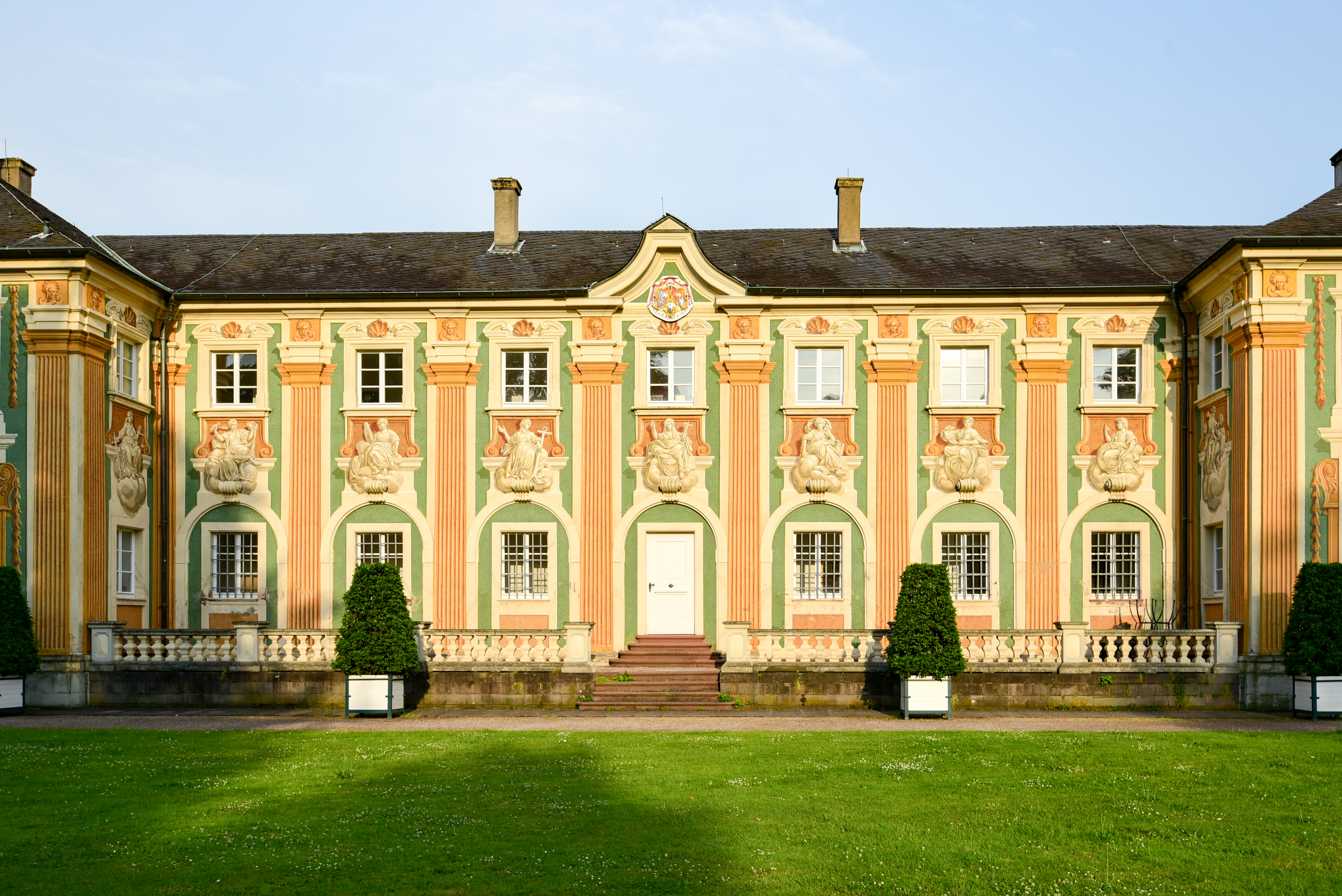
The north orangery, built by Johann Rohrer in 1725

The Chamber Wing's foundations were finished by 1723, by which time the stables and roadside pavilions were completed. After two years of work, however, Seitz departed for his original workplace, Wiesentheid. Damian Hugo fought to keep Seitz until June of that year, when he relented and hired Johann Michael Ludwig Rohrer. Rohrer was a master mason from Rastatt, employed at the court of Sibylla Augusta of Baden-Baden, who was not only in the Roman Catholic Diocese of Speyer, but also a personal friend. Over 1724, Rohrer built the complex's orangeries and the gallery connecting the corps de logis to the Church Wing, itself completed in 1725. The Prince-Bishop moved into the Chamber Wing the next year and would remain there until the beletage was finished in 1730.

The final plan for the corps de logis was only drawn up in 1725 by Rohrer and Welsch, with some input by the latter's young student, Anselm Franz von Ritter zu Groenesteyn. Over that year, Groenesteyn replaced Rohrer as the primary architect and constructed the corps de logis's first floor. Damian Hugo, however, realized that with the existing plan he would not have room for his dressing rooms nor for servants' quarters. In 1726, while Groenesteyn was absent from court, the Prince-Bishop had a mezzanine floor constructed between the designed first and second floors. This addition made Groenesteyn's plan for the staircase impossible and, when he could not devise a new plan, he resigned. He was soon followed by Rohrer, who had fallen ill and out of Damian Hugo's favor in 1727, and Antonio Gresta, charged with painting the Hofkirche's frescoes, who also grew sick in 1727 and died soon thereafter. Construction of the rest of the palace continued according to Rohrer's plans, but under the direction of an architect named Johann Georg Stahl, previously a master carpenter.

Damian Hugo complained to Lothar Franz von Schönborn of the situation. In Lothar Franz's employ was the architect Balthasar Neumann, who had just completed an expansion of Schloss Weißenstein's gardens. Damian Hugo hired Neumann as his new master architect in 1728, but he couldn't actually take charge because of the ascension of Friedrich Karl von Schönborn to the Prince-Bishopric of Würzburg and his employment at the Würzburg Residence. Meanwhile, and again acting on a recommendation from Sibylla of Baden-Baden, Damian Hugo hired Italian painter Cosmas Damian Asam in May 1728 to replace Gresta. In October of that year, Asam requested leave to go home for the winter. In the seven weeks he had been at work, Asam changed Gresta's design on the assumption that those changes had been approved by Damian Hugo. This was in error. The Prince-Bishop, assuming Asam had not managed much in the time he had been at work, was surprised to see the opposite. Though initially angry, the Prince-Bishop forgave Asam as he was impressed with the painter's ability and rewarded his labor with a hunt. Another painter, Judas Thaddäus Sichelbein, was not so lucky and was dismissed on 1732. When Neumann finally arrived at Bruchsal in March 1731, he was tasked first and foremost with designing a new staircase. He accomplished this in 1731–32, creating one of the world's most famous staircases. In July 1732, Damian Hugo hired Giovanni Francesco Marchini to paint the exteriors of the other buildings of the palace complex with faux masonry. Marchini also painted the frescoes of the Entrada and the grotto behind it. From 1737 to 1743, Neumann and Stahl built the guardhouse, hunting office, arsenal, and the tower attached to the Hofkirche. The Hofkirche itself was finished in 1739.

The corps de logis was completed in 1743, but Damian Hugo died that very same year. He was succeeded by Franz Christoph von Hutten, who found the Chamber Wing still unfinished. Neumann and Stahl, now being succeeded by his son Leonhard, continued to work at Bruchsal under Hutten. Hutten ordered the renovation of much of the corps de logis in the Rococo style beginning in 1751 and lasting to 1754. In 1751, Johannes Zick was hired by Hutten following a recommendation from Neumann, for whom Zick had worked at Würzburg, to paint the dome above Neumann's staircase. Another employee of Neumann's, Johann Michael Feuchtmayer, was hired in 1752 to create the Rococo stuccowork Hutten desired. He and Zick worked together until 1756, for example producing the Marble Hall.

Leopold, Maria Anna, and Wolfgang Amadeus Mozart visited Bruchsal Palace in July 1763 to begin a tour up the Rhine. Leopold wrote of the palace on 19 July, "The Residence of Bruchsal is worth seeing, its rooms being in the very best taste, not numerous, but so noble, indescribably charming and precious."

=== Decline ===
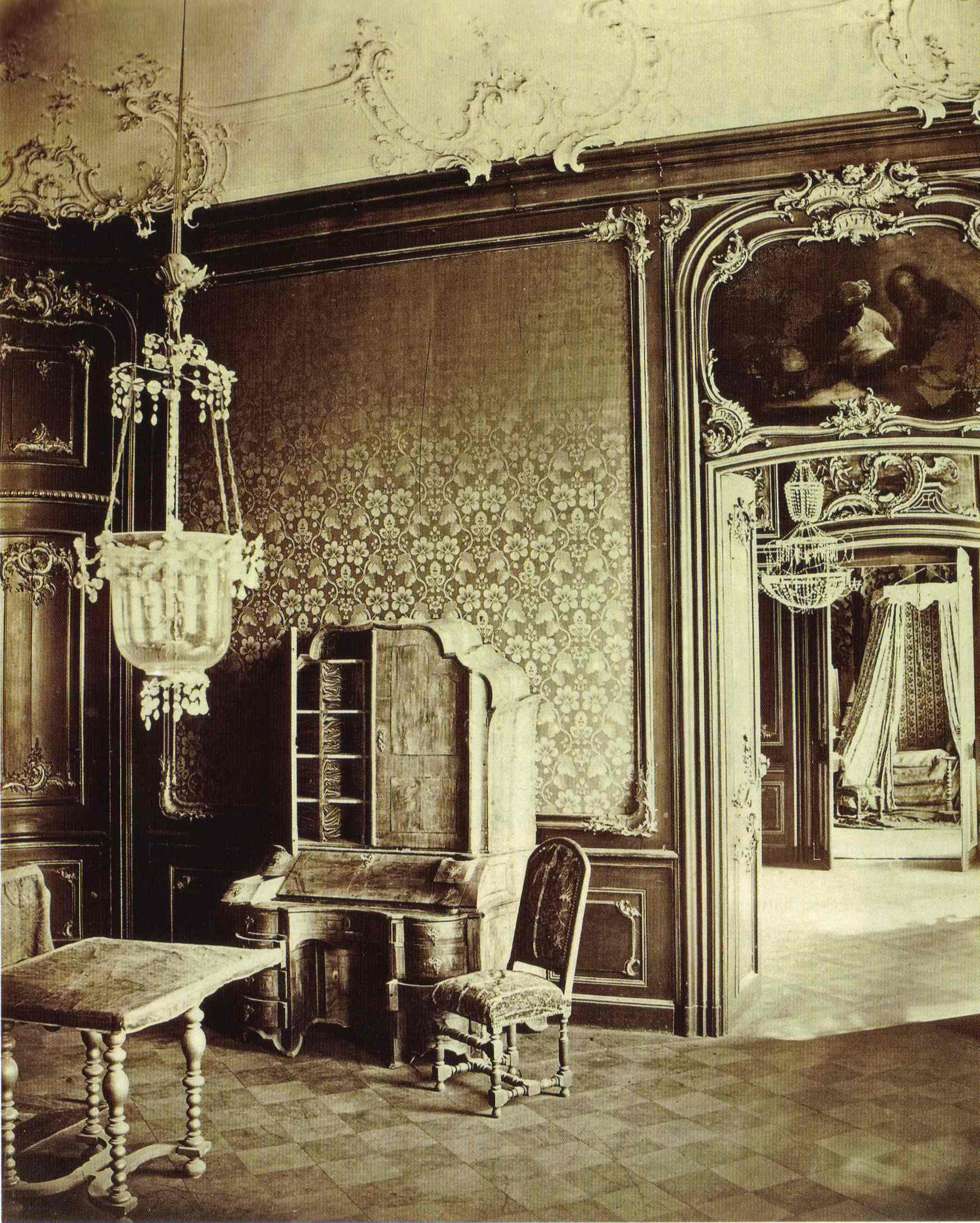
An 1870 photograph of the palace interior

As a result of the Coalition Wars, the Prince-Bishopric of Speyer and the neighboring Margraviate of Baden had been forced to cede their territory on the left bank of the Rhine to France. Per the Treaty of Campo Formio, Baden was to be compensated with new territory, and this was effected. Baden was given seven times the amount of land it had lost, at the expense of Austria and ecclesiastical states such as the Prince-Bishopric of Speyer. This concession was confirmed in February 1803 by the Reichsdeputationshauptschluss, though Baden was soon raised to a Grand Duchy. Baden's ruler, Charles Frederick, summarily occupied Bruchsal and forced the departure of the last Prince-Bishop, Philipp Franz von Walderdorf. Charles Frederick dissolved the "Principality" of Speyer and removed much of Bruchsal Palace's furnishings to Karlsruhe, though he awarded Walderdorf a pension of 200,000 guilders and allowed him to reside at Bruchsal in the winters. (Note: Philipp Franz von Walderdorf's summer residence post-secularization was the Waghäusel Hermitage.)

When Charles Frederick died in 1806, Walderdorf shared Bruchsal with the widow of the Grand Duke's son and heir, Amalie of Hesse-Darmstadt with her unmarried daughter, Amalie Christiane von Baden, who had been replaced at court by Stéphanie de Beauharnais. Amalie spent three to four months of every summer at the palace, time she spent in a constant monotony that she often took vacations to escape. Amalie's household at Bruchsal and its upkeep was at her own expense. The early 19th century traveler Charles Edward Dodd, who visited the palace around 1818, described its "deserted splendour" wherein "the gay ladies of [Princess Amalie's] court complain bitterly of its magnificent dreariness." Two other contemporary visitors, Frederick William III of Prussia and the Russian empress Elizabeth Alexeievna, also noted the dreary state of Bruchsal Palace. Bruchsal's citizenry adored Amalie, though, and mourned her death on 27 July 1832.

Following Amalie von Baden's death, Bruchsal Palace was used for myriad purposes while it steadily deteriorated. In 1849, during the Baden Revolution, the ground floor of the corps de logis was used for a barrack and later a military hospital for Prussian soldiers.

In 1869, two years before the palace vanished from guide books in Germany, the Grand Duchy of Baden's Ministry of the Interior made plans to move a Catholic seminary into the palace. A major renovation was planned to fit the school, but were short lived. A decade later in 1880, the court jeweler of the Landgrave of Hesse wrote to the Badener government on behalf of the Vicomte de Montfort, a Parisian aristocrat. The Vicomte desired to reside at the palace and renovate it, but his request was rejected. Beginning at this time, hundreds of high-quality photographs were made of the palace's interiors.

A restoration of the palace grounds was carried out at Bruchsal from 1900 to 1909 under the direction of German art historian Fritz Hirsch.

The Grand Duchy of Baden was dissolved on 9 November 1918 and was followed by Grand Duke Frederick II's abdication on 22 November.

The beletage was opened to the public as a permanent exhibit of the palace's treasures in the 1920s.

=== Destruction and restoration ===
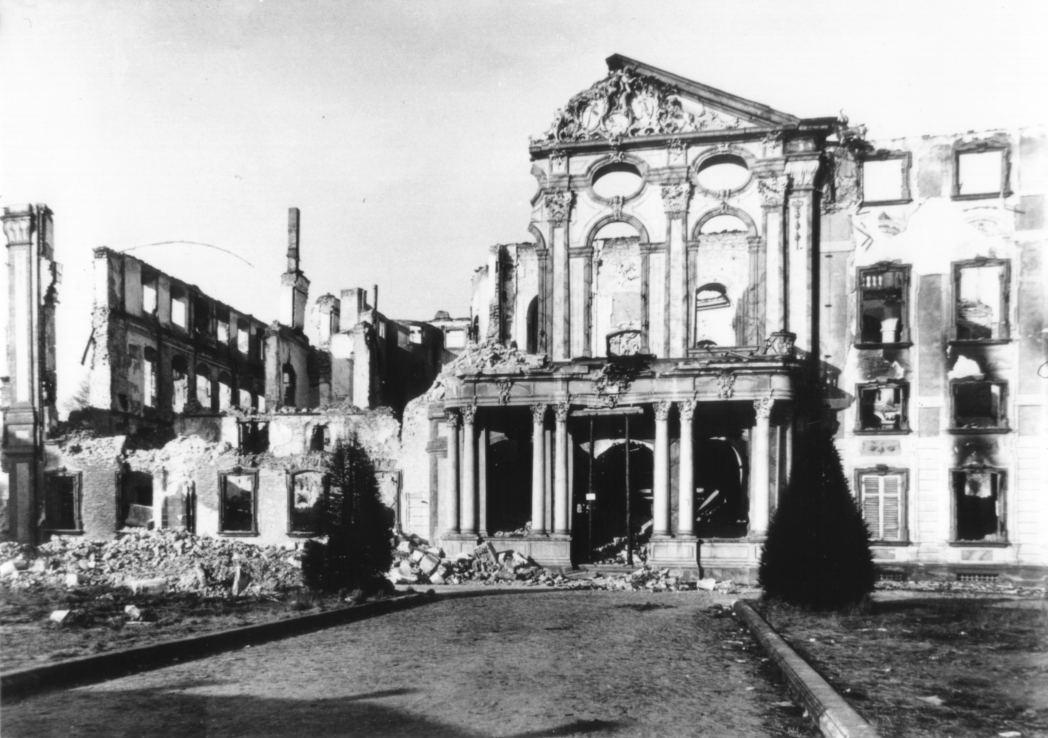
Ruins of Bruchsal Palace in 1945

In the closing days of the Second World War, the American Army Air Force bombed Bruchsal to disable its railway facilities. In one raid on 1 March 1945, the 379th Expeditionary Operations Group attacked and destroyed the city's marshaling yard. 80% of the city was destroyed, as was Bruchsal Palace, incinerated to just the staircase and some of the facade. Reconstruction, aided by the pictures taken in the late 19th century, began the next year with some of the minor buildings put back together to provide administrative offices and temporary housing. In 1947, work on the residential structure began in the Chamber Wing. The shell of the corps de logis was rebuilt from 1953 to 1956, though conversely the church wing was demolished in 1959.

The palace was reopened on 28 February 1975, though reconstruction on the facades lasted two more years. The reconstitution of the palace's many frescoes continued until 1996.

To commemorate the 50th anniversary of the Franco-German friendship, French President François Mitterrand and German Chancellor Helmut Kohl met at Bruchsal Palace on 12 November 1987.

The 12th DiGA Garden Festival was held here from 25 to 27 May 2018.

== Architecture ==
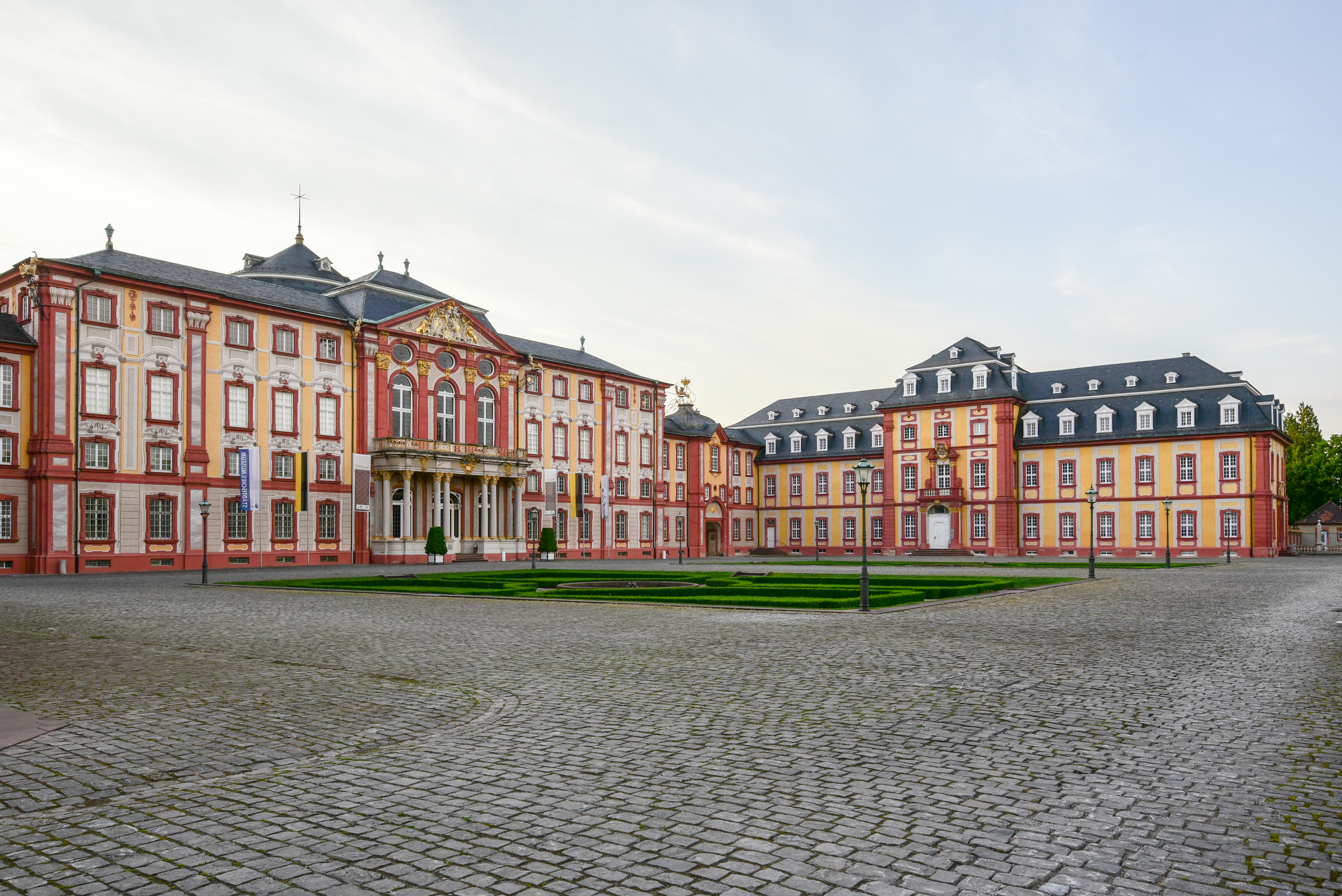
The corps de logis and the Chamber Wing

Sometimes called the Damiansburg (Damian's Castle), after Damian Hugo von Schönborn, who built the palace with unconventional methods and purpose. Damian Hugo built the palace with careful financing and a reliance on local industry, which allowed him to maintain a positive annual income despite the cost of construction. Additionally, the palace was built of brick in response to the French destruction by fire of the Episcopal Palace in Speyer.

The exteriors of several of the palace complex's brick buildings are painted to appear to be made of masonry. The facades of the two wings off the corps de logis are defined by risalite, made up of a balcony atop a door, and are discriminated by pilasters that also form the buildings' corners.

Despite Damian Hugo's love of the Viennese Baroque aesthetic and the work of Balthasar Neumann, Bruchsal Palace bears Westphalian and Dutch influence, thanks to Johann Conrad Schlaun. Damian Hugo began with a French-style plan in 1720, but changed his plans after the next year's Papal Conclave and incorporated Italian, Dutch, and English influences in addition. The interiors of Bruchsal Palace share many similarities with the Würzburg Residence. The stucco ornamentation within, mostly of the Rococo style, is French-influenced.

To save money, Damian Hugo used the same architects as at other Schönborn family projects. One of these was Balthasar Neumann, author of the Würzburg Residence, the palace of Damian Hugo's brothers. Neumann worked at Bruchsal as chief architect from 1731 until his death in 1753. The frugal Damian Hugo was succeeded by Hutten, who brought pomp and chic to Bruchsal. He renovated the second floor in the Rococo style from 1751 to 1754. When Leopold Mozart visited in 1763, he described Bruchsal as being of "the very best taste".

Damian Hugo personally knew virtually none of the artisans that worked at Bruchsal Palace and relied on recommendations from family and friends like Sibylla Augusta of Baden-Baden, the Margravine of Baden. Johann Rohrer, Cosmas Damian Asam, and Egid Quirin Asam were among the men recommended to Damian Hugo by the Margravine.

From 1725 to his dismissal in 1727, Rohrer prepared 717 plans for Bruchsal Palace, 63 of which were for the Hofkirche alone.

Neumann worked at Bruchsal on and off with Johann Georg Stahl from 1731 to his death in 1753.

The chamber music hall, decorated in the Louis XVI style, represents an experiment in early Neoclassicism.

Renovations in the 1970s revealed the original Baroque frescoes of the "leaf room" (Laubenzimmer). They are thought to have been painted by Marchini, as they resemble his work from Damian Hugo at Schloss Favorite in Rastatt in 1718. The design itself, wooden lattices interlaced with vines and birds, is an Italianate design that originated in the 16th and 17th centuries.

The German art historian Cornelius Gurlitt extensively praised the artifice of Bruchsal Palace in his 1889 work History of the Baroque and Rococo Styles in Germany.

=== Ground floor ===
Forming the entrance to the palace is an entrance hall called the Intrada, containing a ceiling fresco of personifications of the seven virtues defeating the seven sins by Giovanni Francesco Marchini, who was responsible for most of the paintings on the ground floor. Above the pillars are windowed galleries into the servant quarters, which were not in the plans of the palace and were forced by Damian Hugo Philipp von Schönborn in 1726 and forced a redesign of the staircase.

Enclosed by Balthasar Neumann's grand staircase is the Grotto, dimly lit in imitation of a cave and decorated by Marchini with murals of plantlife, shells, and river deities beneath a ceiling fresco of a bird-filled sky. Marchini's work in the Grotto, although still reddened by fire, was restored after World War II but not in the neighboring Garden Hall, which survived the war but suffered water and frost damage. The ceiling fresco remains unrestored in a permanent exhibition of the palace's destruction in 1945.

=== Staircase ===
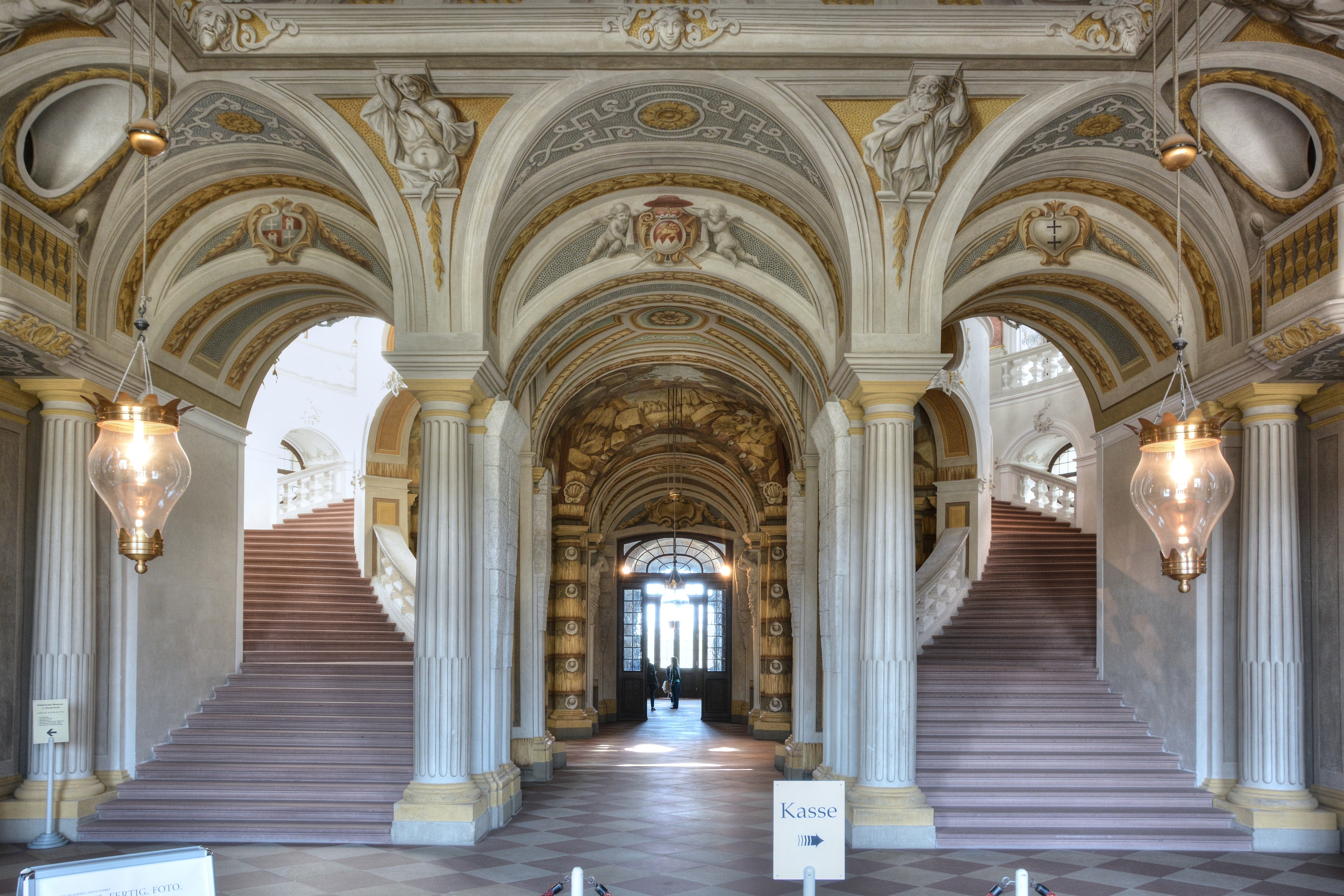
The base of the two arms of the palace staircase

Entered from the back of the Intrada and wrapping around the Grotto is the Staircase, built by Balthasar Neumann from 1731 to 1732. Anselm Franz von Ritter zu Groenesteyn's 1725 plan for the palace was ordinary, perhaps inspired by the Palazzo Carignano, but Prince-Bishop Damian Hugo added a mezzanine between the first and second floors to make room for his dressing rooms and quarters for his servant staff. In doing so, the designed staircase was now too short to reach the second floor and Groenesteyn could not amend the issue. In 1731, Balthasar Neumann set to work to fill the gap, drawing up a design for a spiral staircase – a feature that had not been common in German architecture since the Middle Ages. Neumann also extended the upper landing to connect the beletage's two state rooms and thereby formed an oval that was then wrapped with a pair of staircases. This staircase has, since its construction, been the object of much praise. Noted historian of art and architecture Nikolaus Pevsner held Bruchsal Palace, and especially its staircase, in high regard. Of the latter, he wrote in An Outline of European Architecture:

But the staircase at Bruchsal is unique. Words can hardly re-evoke the enchanting sensation that one experiences in walking up one of its two arms. [...] Bruchsal with its perfect unity of space and decorations was the high-water mark of the Baroque style.

=== Second floor ===
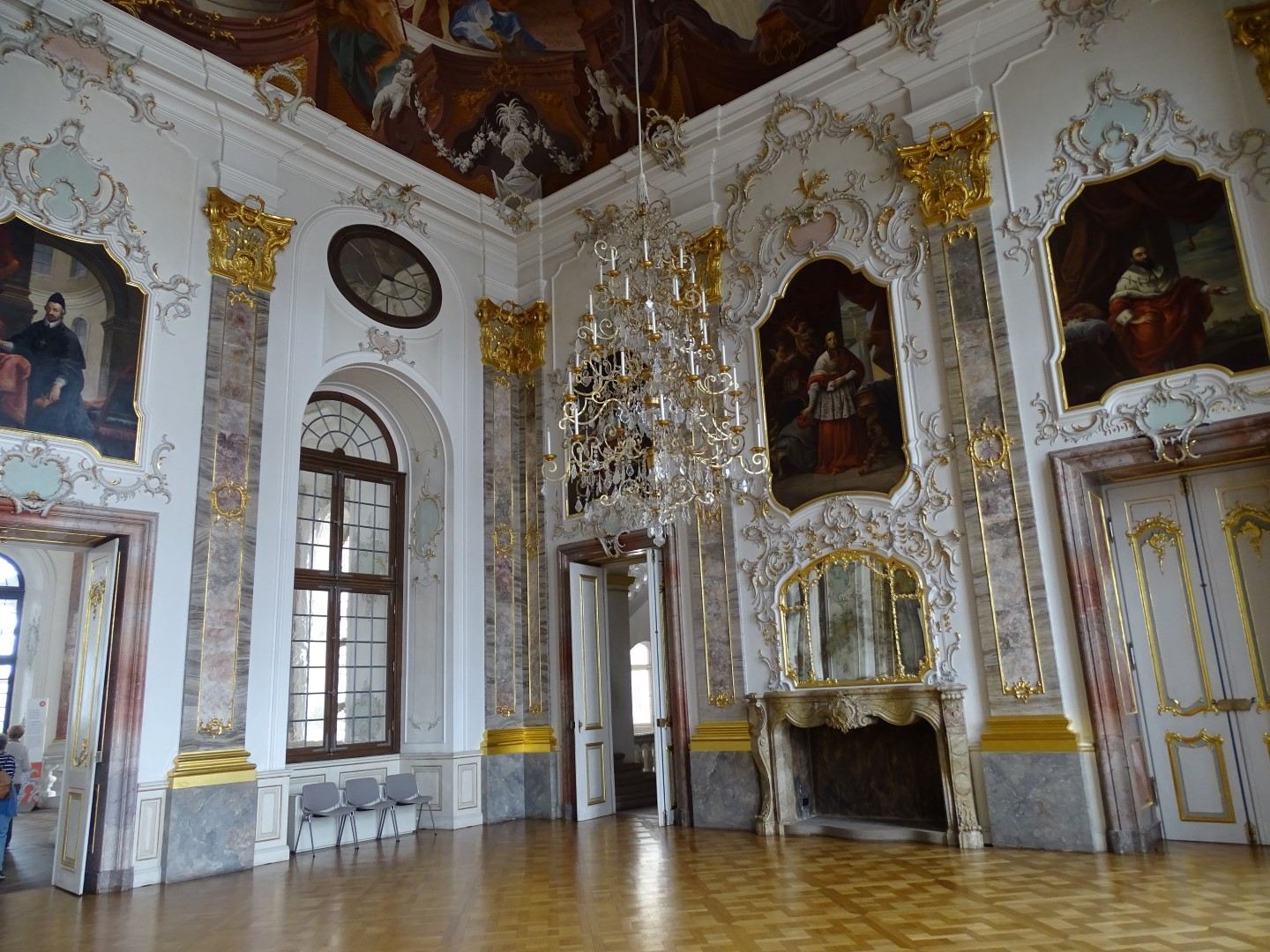
A corner of Prince's Hall, reminiscent of the Hôtel de Soubise

Above the staircase is a massive fresco, covering the entire dome, painted by Johannes Zick in 1752. Zick's fresco documents and glorifies the construction projects of Prince-Bishops Damian Hugo von Schönborn and Franz Christoph von Hutten. Male figures in the fresco represent architecture and construction, while female figures represent painting and sculpture. To the left of von Hutten are thought to be the two foremen of the palace's construction, Johann Georg Stahl and his son, Johann Leonhard.

The entrance to the second floor is a large chamber and dome at the top of the stairs decorated by artists who had previously worked at the Würzburg Residence. Woodcarver Ferdinand Hundt created the paneling, Johann Michael Feuchtmayer produced the stucco, and Johannes Zick painted the frescoes. Zick's ceiling fresco depicts the history of the Bishops of Speyer, beginning with Jesse in the 4th century and ending with Damian Hugo and Hutten, who are portrayed as patrons of the arts and architecture.

The Prince's Hall (German: Fürstensaal) is one of two ballrooms on the beletage; it is the southern of the two. The hall also functions as an ahnentafel, bearing portraits of the Prince-Bishops from Eberhard von Dienheim to Wilderich of Walderdorf, the final Prince-Bishop. The other hall, to the north, is the Marble Hall. It features a massive ceiling fresco painted by Johannes Zick and his son Januarius. The stucco and fireplace and mirrors of the Prince's Hall are French in nature, resembling the interior of the Hôtel de Soubise, but also Austria's St. Florian Monastery.

The apartments on the south side of the main building were remodeled by Johann Michael Feuchtmayer for Hutten in the 1760s. Walderdorff lived in them from his abdication as Prince-Bishop in 1802 until his death. The southern state apartment opens with an antechamber containing some surviving examples of original Rococo stucco, furniture by Abraham Roentgen, and some of the oldest tapestries in the palace's collection. Next is the Prince-Bishop's audience chamber, also housing original furnishings removed from the palace in 1939. Among these items is a life-size portrait of Hutten painted by Johann Nikolaus Treu. Past the bedroom are the Watteau Cabinet, used as a wardrobe and destroyed during WWII, and the room of the Prince-Bishop's chamberlain.

The private apartments of the last Prince-Bishop are comparatively modest compared to the other beletage enfilades. The most private rooms were marked by still life, landscape, or genre overdoor paintings, such as the still life overdoors in the dining hall. On display in the gallery room are a number of paintings and furnishings owned by the Prince-Bishop until their relocation in the 19th century. The last of this suite's rooms is the Blue Room, decorated in 1810 with blue silks for Frederica of Baden. The room houses two tapestries from Ovid's Metamorphoses, depicting Leda and Europa.

The northern state apartment also starts with an antechamber attached to the Marble Hall, adorned with stucco reliefs of hunting and fishing. This room also houses the Groteskenfolge, a six-part tapestry series made from 1685 to 1717 by the Philippe Behagle manufactury in Beauvais. The succeeding room is similarly ornamented, but with musical instruments and an overdoor painting depicting the tale of Gaius Mucius Scaevola. The largest room in the suite is the throne room, decorated with more tapestries. In between the throne room and suite's bedroom is a chapel.

Amalie von Baden had her apartment renovated in 1806 in the Empire style. Her antechamber contains four tapestries of exotic settings made by the Aubusson manufactory. Adjoining this is Amalie's audience room, containing more paintings from the original palace collection, and French-made furniture. Next is the Yellow Room, a living room containing more tapestries, made in Brussels between 1550 and 1575. The last room in Amalie's apartment is her bedroom, which furnished from 1810 to 1815 in high Empire style fashion.

=== Hofkirche ===
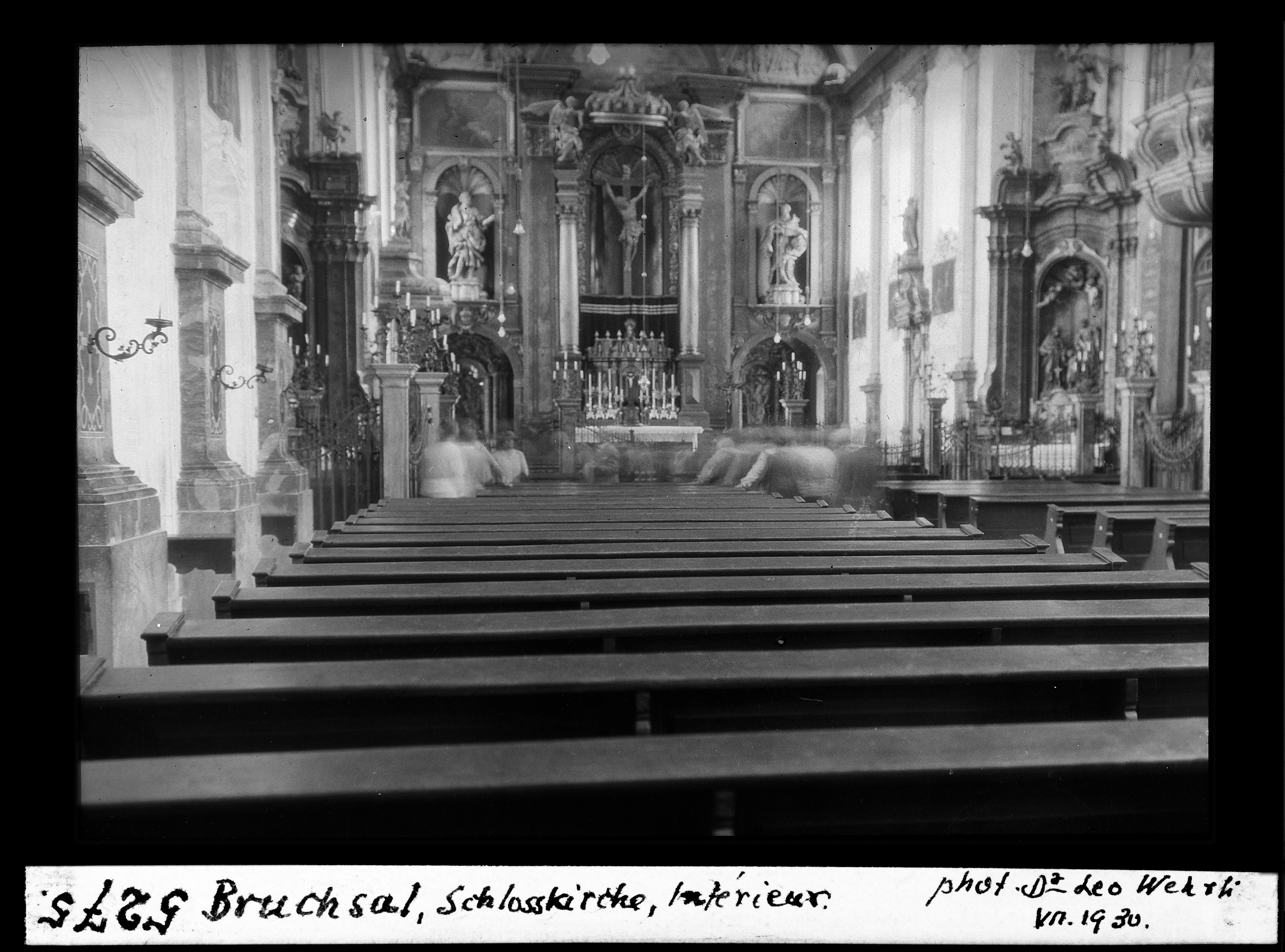
The Hofkirche in 1930

The Hofkirche is connected to the palace's left wing by a narrow hall. It was designed by Balthasar Neumann in 1740 and painted by Cosmas Damian Asam. Asam was appointed in 1728 following the sudden death of the painter previously contracted to create the fresco, Antonio Gresta. Despite some animosity from Damian Hugo toward him, Asam painted the ceiling with images of Saints Cosmas, Damian, and Hugh in light pastels, impressing the Prince-Bishop. The Hofkirche was destroyed in World War II and a new church was built in its place from 1960 to 1966, with work by Fritz Wotruba and HAP Grieshaber.

Nine bronze statuettes of the Twelve Apostles, made in Augsburg around 1593, were recovered from the post-1945 wreckage of the Hofkirche and are today on display in the modern chapel.

=== North wing ===
The chamber music hall, Kammermusiksaal, was designed and decorated by Joachim Günther for August Philip of Limburg Stirum in 1776. The room was originally two stories high, but a fake roof was put in place during Günther's renovation. Its yellow walls are covered in vibrant early Neoclassical stucco of floral friezes and garlands of wind instruments. The Kammermusiksaal was the significant first room in the palace to be fully restored, being completed in 1955.

== Grounds and gardens ==
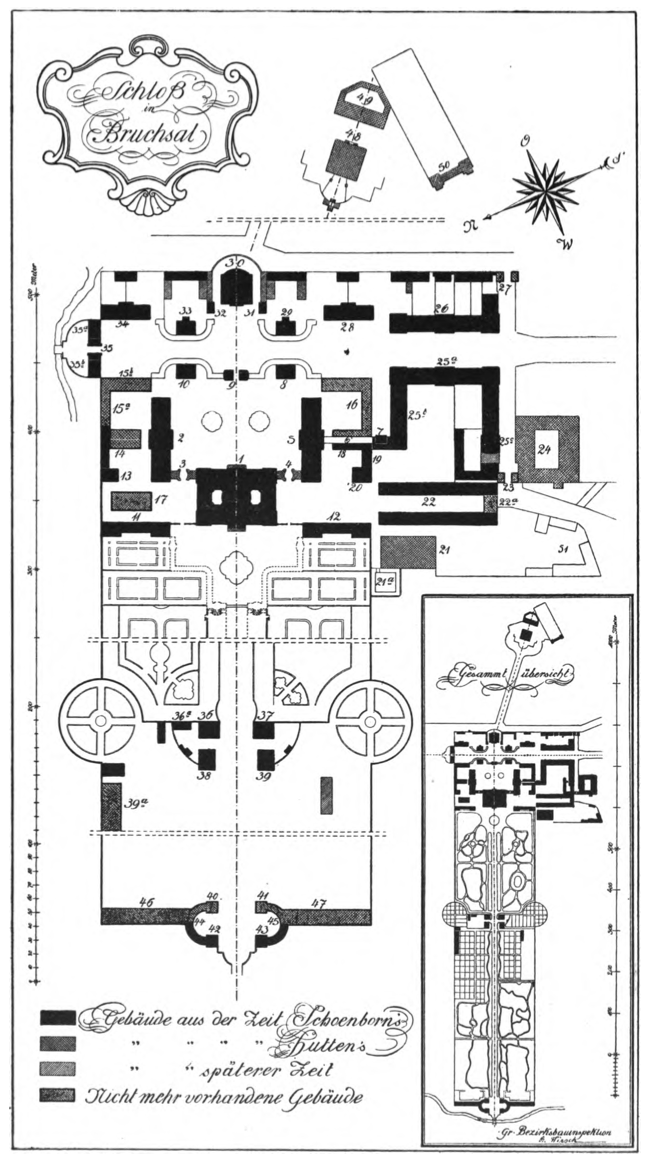
Plan of Bruchsal Palace's grounds. The Ehrenhof is at the center of the map.

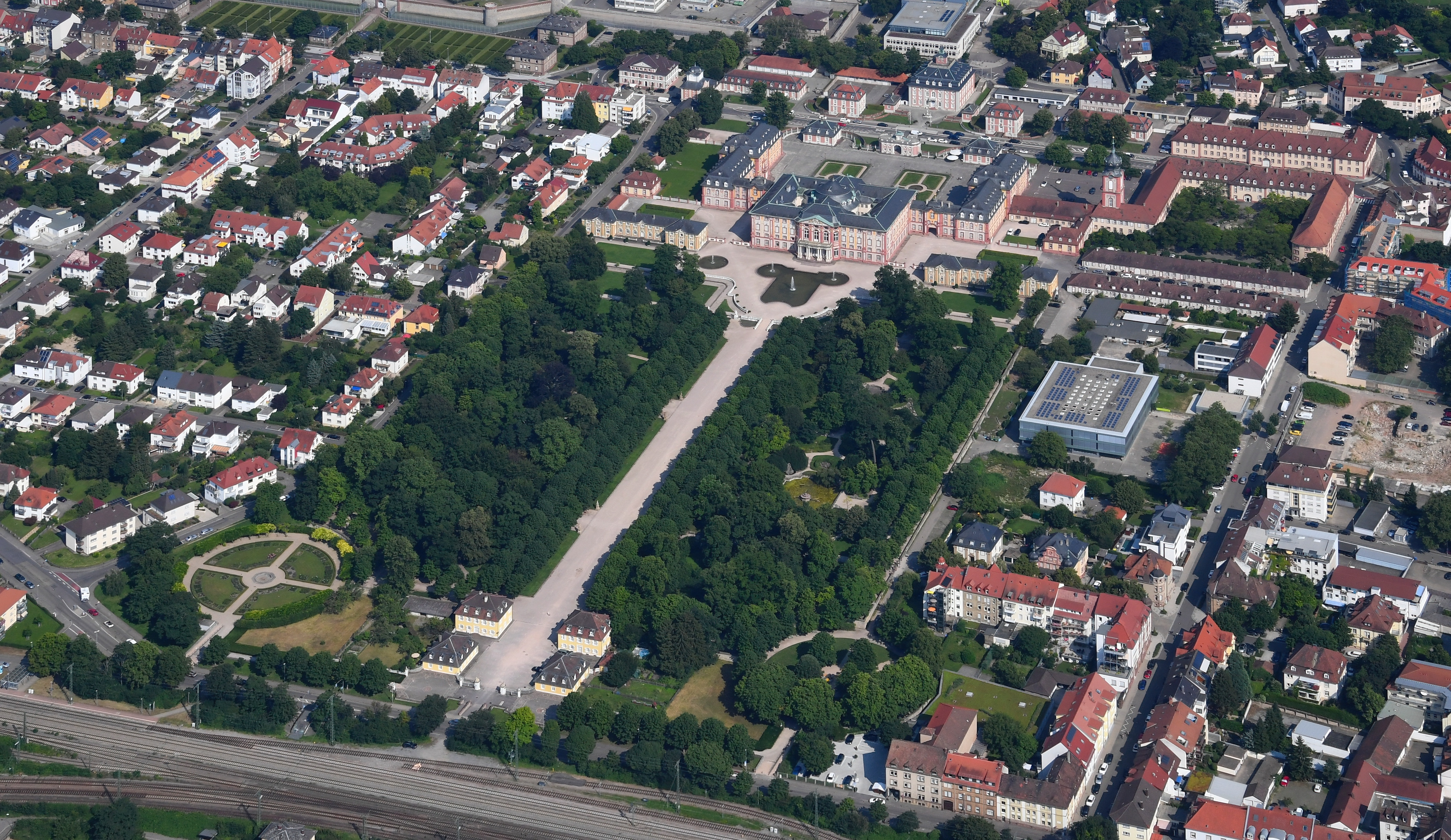
Aerial view of the Bruchsal Palace and gardens

In totality, there were 50 buildings on the grounds of Bruchsal Palace. The main palace area takes up 5,400 square meters (58,000 sq ft). It is located at the center of the palace grounds. Attached to the main building are two wings for the palace chapel and the apartments of the Prince-Bishop's courtiers.

Welsch's original plan for the complex, discovered in 2010 at the Austrian National Library in Vienna, where Friedrich Karl was based, was of a three-wing composition similar to a 1711 plan of Schloss Weißenstein by Johann Dientzenhofer. The original plan, with the exception of the corps de logis survived into the existing structure. It placed the palace complex on a right-angle to the road leading from Bruchsal's north-east gate, 1,000 feet (300 m) distant. That road, now called the Schönbornstrasse, would have separated two sets of four identical buildings.

The palace gardens (Schlossgarten) lie along a north-west running avenue called the Schlossraum. The Schlossraum is lined with statuary produced in the 1750s by the workshop of Joachim Günther depicting the classical elements and the four seasons, while an additional four "guardians" stand in the lower garden, near the pools. The garden itself was first laid out in 1723 and was then doubled in size in 1728. This was replaced in 1770 with an English landscape garden. A railroad track constructed in 1843 shortened the length from 800 meters (2,600 ft) to just 300 meters (980 ft).

In front of the chancellery (now the district courthouse) is the Amalienbrunnen, erected in 1911 and dedicated to Amalie von Baden. It stands in front of the Amtsgericht Bruchsal.

The grounds of Bruchsal Palace are occasionally used to host festivities such as an annual Christmas market (Weihnachtsmarkt) and festival, established in 2009.

=== Museums ===
The two main museums at Bruchsal Palace are the Deutsches Musikautomaten-Museum (German music machine museum), maintained by the Baden State Museum, and the Municipal History Museum. The Deutsches Musikautomaten-Museum, founded in 1984, exhibits some 500 examples of German-made "automatic musical machines," such as a self-playing replica of the RMS Titanic's organ, from the 17th to the 21st centuries on three floors of the palace. They are all displayed in a setting contemporary to their production, highlighting their place in society. Audio recordings of the collection's various pieces is available on the Baden State Museum's website. The Municipal Museum, on the third floor of the palace, traces the history of Bruchsal from the Neolithic to the modern day. Focal points are the history of the penal system in the city and Bruchsal's destruction in the Second World War.

Built, Destroyed, Resurrected (Gebaut, Zerstört, Wiedererstanden) is a permanent exhibit documenting the destruction of Bruchsal Palace on 1 March 1945. It displays pieces of the pre-war palace and the black-and-white photographs used to reconstruct its interiors.

The lapidary, in the basement of a southern connecting building, contains stone sculptures from the residential building and surrounding structures. Examples include coats of arms, puttis and dwarves, capitals, and balustrade pieces.

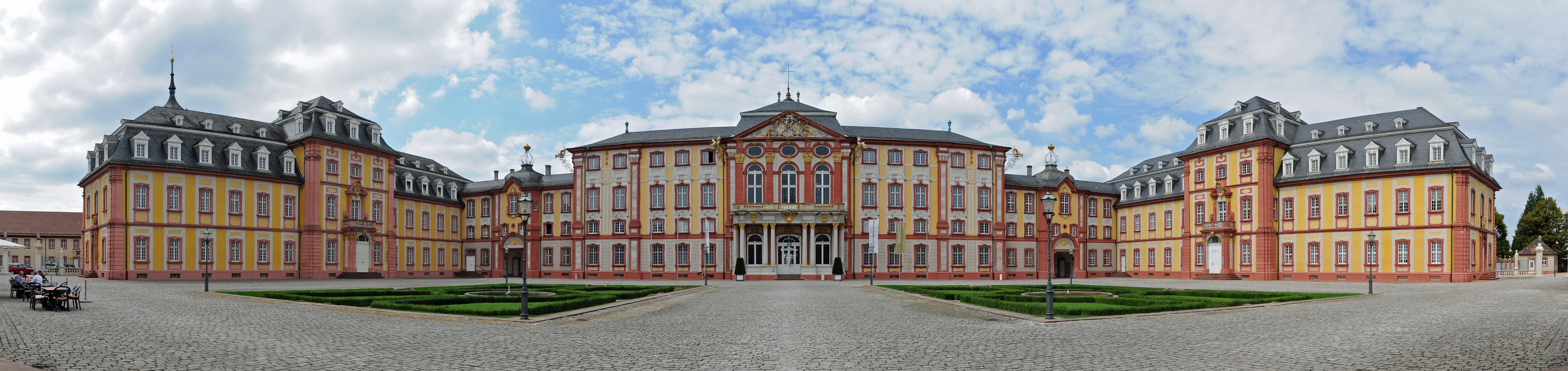
Bruchsal Palace from the cour d'honneur
