= Paul J. Coleman =

American space scientist (1932–2019)

Paul J. Coleman Jr.
- Born: March 7, 1932; Chicago, Illinois
- Died: April 6, 2019 (aged 87); Los Angeles, California
- Education: University of California, Los Angeles (Ph.D.)
- Awards: Exceptional Scientific Achievement Medal (twice)
- Scientific career
- Fields: Space

Paul J. Coleman Jr. (March 7, 1932 – April 6, 2019) was an American space scientist, NASA veteran, professor of space physics at the University of California, Los Angeles and founding chairman of the Girvan Institute of Technology. Coleman was also a co-founder of JumpStartFund, an online crowdsourcing platform.

He was awarded two Exceptional Scientific Achievement Medal by NASA, one in 1970 for his contributions to the exploration of the Solar System and the other in 1972 for his contributions to the exploration of the Moon. In 1975 he was elected in the International Academy of Astronautics. He was a John Simon Guggenheim Fellow in 1975 and a Senior Fulbright Scholar from 1975 to 1976. P From 1981 to 2000, he was president and CEO of the USRA. In 1985, Dr. Coleman was appointed by President Ronald Reagan to the National Commission on Space; in 1991, he was appointed by Vice President Dan Quayle to the Space policy Advisory Board. In 2004, he was recognized by Space News, as one of ten "Innovators and visionaries" who "made a difference' in the global space enterprise over the preceding fifteen years".

== Early life and career ==
Coleman held BS Engineering degrees in mathematics and physics, an MS degree in physics, and a PhD in space physics. He served two years as a commissioned officer in the United States Air Force, with duty in Europe, South Korea, and Turkey from 1954 to 1956.

His early professional experience included positions at the Ramo-Wooldridge Corporation (acquired by Northrop Grumman) and at the headquarters of the National Aeronautics and Space Administration in Washington, D.C., as manager of NASA's interplanetary sciences program.

In 1965, he joined the faculty at UCLA. There, with Dr. T.A. Farley, he established a laboratory for research in space physics. In the course of his research on charged particles and electric and magnetic fields in space, he worked with the Explorer, OGO and ATS series of satellites, the Pioneer series of deep-space probes, the Mariner series of planetary spacecraft, Apollo's 15 and 17, and Galileo. He wrote or collaborated in writing more than 150 articles on research in the space sciences and developments in space technology.
