= Andrew Quintero =

American scientist (1963–2014)

- Born: 1963; Mountain View, California, US
- Died: May 4, 2014; Waikiki Beach, Hawaii, US
- Occupation: Entrepreneur
- Known for: Co-founder of JumpStartFund and patents in Space research
- Spouse: Cristine Wolf
- Scientific career
- Fields: Space and Defense

Andrew Quintero (1963 – May 4, 2014) was an American scientist and entrepreneur. He was the co-founder of JumpStartFund, a platform which provides crowdsourcing for start-up tech companies.

== Early life and career ==
Born in 1963 in Mountain View, California, Quintero was a member of the St. Thomas Aquinas Parish in Palo Alto in his early years. He graduated from Palo Alto High School and continued on to earn his Executive MBA from Loyola Marymount.

He was an architect of a Space Systems Engineering Database. Andrew also worked for Hughes Space and Communications, supporting anomaly and failure investigations. He patented a program named Smart Cow, an intelligent search engine.

== Death ==
Andrew was found unconscious and floating on his back 30 feet (9 m) offshore near a Waikiki Beach restaurant. He was taken to the hospital by local lifeguards and died there at about 8:40 AM of May 4, 2014 at the age of 51.

== See also ==
- Space engineering
- Crowdsourcing
