= Jumpstarter =

Jumpstarter, Inc.
- Type: Crowdsourcing
- Headquarters: El Segundo, California
- Key people: Dirk Ahlborn; Andrew Quintero; Paul Coleman; Donald R. Thorne
- Website: www.jumpstartfund.com

Jumpstarter, Inc is a California-based company. The company builds technology solutions to allow crowd collaboration. The technology allows for a combination of crowdsourcing and crowdfunding. The company has its own web portal, jumpstartfund, through which it explores the concept of a crowd-powered incubator. The company is known for picking Elon Musk's idea of Hyperloop and incorporating it as founding party under Hyperloop Transportation Technologies Inc.

== JumpStartFund ==
JumpStartFund is a Southern California based crowd-powered online incubator and crowd collaboration platform. The company provides a platform that allows building of communities around projects, technologies and ideas. The founding members of the company are Paul J.Coleman, Dirk Ahlborn, Andrew Quintero. They have also been part of Girvan Institute of Technology, a non-profit incubator providing help growing technology start-up companies.

JumpStartFund was started in 2012 as a web portal for crowd collaboration and crowdfunding by JumpStarter Inc,.

=== Projects ===
JumpStartFund is focused on entrepreneurial projects, especially:

==== Hyperloop ====
Hyperloop Transportation Technologies, a research company organized to bring Elon Musk's idea of Hyperloop into reality is backed by JumpStartFund. After publicizing his concept of the Hyperloop in a white paper, Elon Musk declared he could not work to create a prototype because of his busy schedule and commitments to other projects with his own companies Tesla Motors and SpaceX. JumpStartFund considered it to be their first project and started work on it using their crowd collaboration platform. On 27.02.2015, JumpStartFund announced plans to build a 5-miles test track in California, to be built from 2016 to 2019, and financed by an IPO in 2015.

== See also ==
- Crowdsourcing
- Hyperloop
