= Wilderich of Walderdorf =

German count and Prince-Bishop

Philipp Franz Wilderich Nepomuk
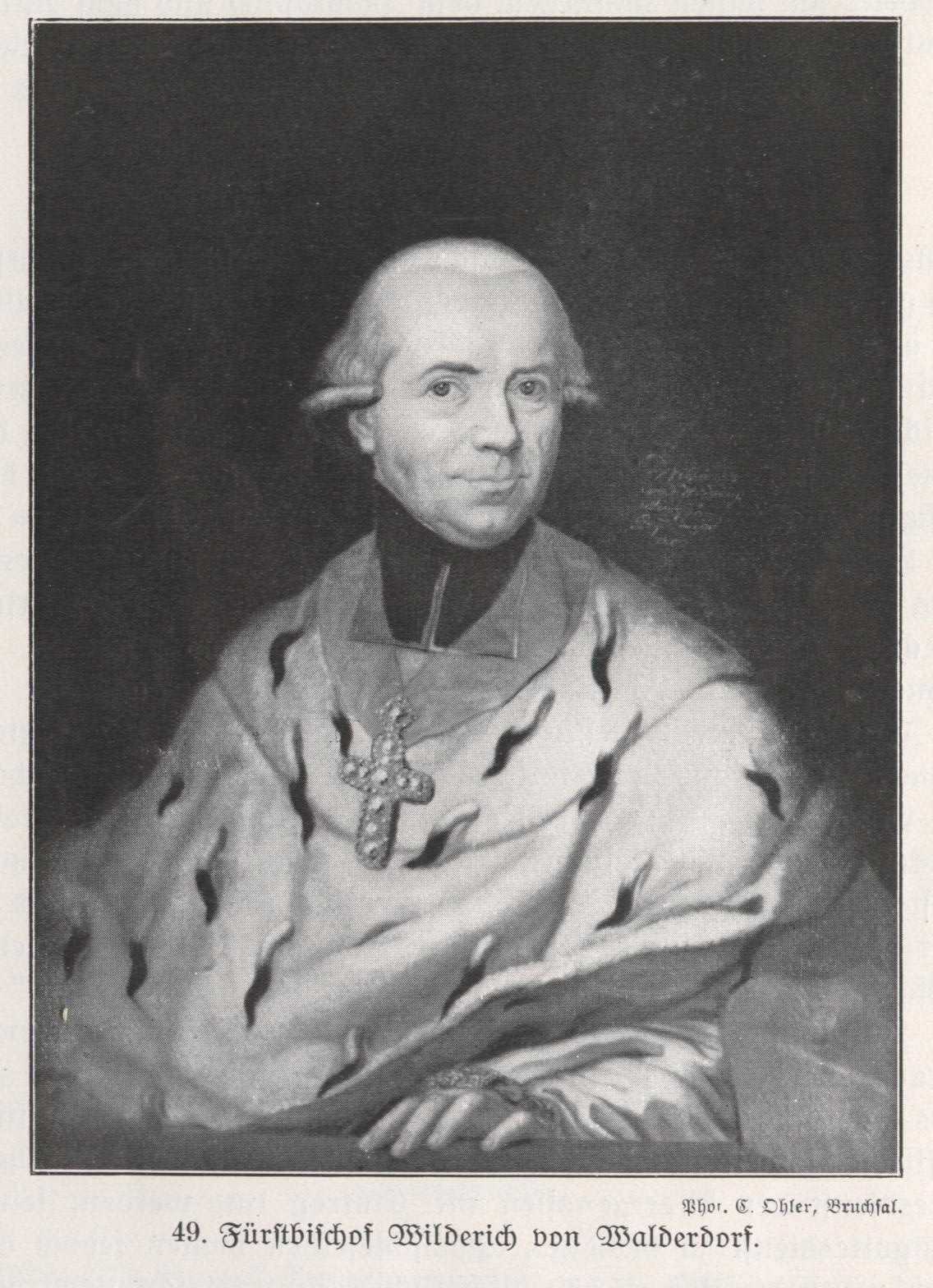
- The last prince-bishop of Speyer. Wildericus Dei et Apostolicae Sedis Gratia Episcopus Viennensis S. R. I. Princeps, Sacrae. Caes. Maiestatis Consiliarius Intimus, Praepositus Spirensis &c.

Prince-Bishop of Speyer
- In office 22 April 1797 – 1803
- Preceded by: August Philip of Limburg Stirum
- Succeeded by: Secularization

Personal details
- Born: 2 March 1739
- Died: 21 April 1810 (aged 71)
- Occupation: Count of Walderdorf

Philipp Franz Wilderich Nepomuk (2 March 1739 – 21 April 1810) was count of Walderdorf and the last prince-bishop of Speyer.

== Biography ==
His reign was short, from 1797 until the secularization in 1803. It was unusual that during the secularization, Wilderich was able to live in the south wing of his official residence, the baroque palace in Bruchsal, until his death in 1810. When he was inaugurated in his office, there were already signs indicating that the dissolution of the old empire was at hand. On 22 April 1797, following the death of his predecessor August Philip of Limburg Stirum, Walderich, who was at that time the Domdechant of Trier, was installed as lord bishop of Speyer.

Wilderich left few physical traces of construction in the Bruchsal palace. It was the little room north of the Fürstensaal, which the newly appointed bishop immediately arranged for his regency. The stuccoers had to use all their imagination and Walderich did not exactly make it easy for them. It was less the artistic design of space as much as the willfulness of the presentation, which Wilderich demanded. More so it was with the furniture with which they had to decorate the room.

At the beginning of 1799 the French armies crossed the Rhine and by the Treaty of Lunéville of 9 February 1801, Emperor Francis II recognized the annexation to the French Republic of the entire left bank of the river, including the cathedral city of Speyer. Prince-bishop Wilderich who had fled the French advance returned to his palace at Bruchsal on 10 June 1801. However, in December of the following year, in the course of the German mediatization, what was left of the prince-bishopric on the right bank of the Rhine was secularized and became part of the newly created Principality of Bruchsal, now part of Baden, which began to establish an administration. The Bruchsal palace became the property of Baden. Bishop Walderich lost all his secular powers but retained his princely title. He was granted a pension of 200,000 florins and the right of residence in the Waghäusel Hermitage; in winter he could continue to live in a part of the former episcopal palace. From 1806 onward he lived next to the recently widowed Princess Amalie von Baden, who took up residence in the northern part of the palace.

== Sources ==
- Translated and edited from de:Philipp Franz Wilderich Nepomuk von Walderdorf, 10 December 2008
