= Dirk Ahlborn =

Entrepreneur and investor

Dirk Ahlborn FRS
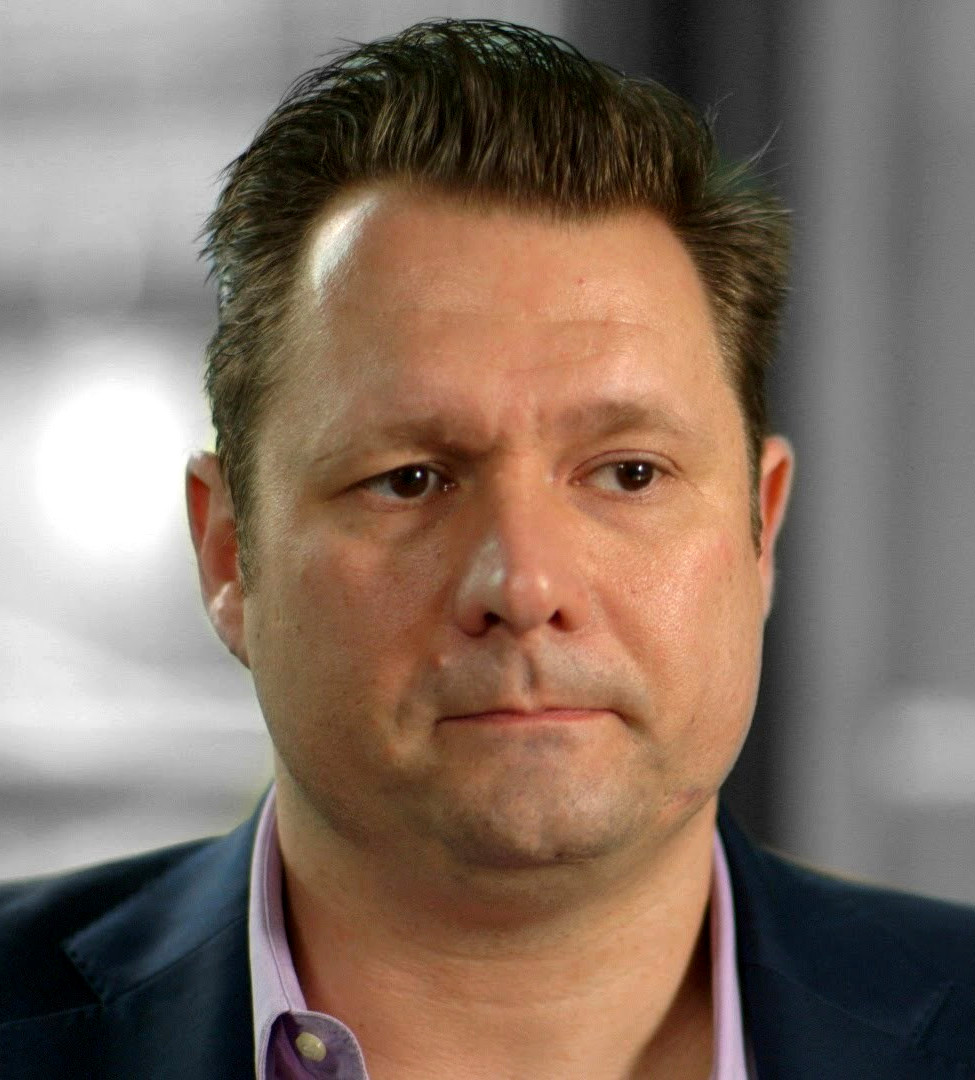
- Occupations: Entrepreneur, investor
- Notable work: Building Hyperloop, Hyperloop Transportation Technologies (HTT)
- Title: Founder, Chairman of Hyperloop Transportation Technologies; CEO of Jumpstarter, Inc

Dirk Ahlborn is an entrepreneur, investor, and an American businessman. He is from Berlin and currently works in California; he holds a U.S. citizenship and is the founder and Chairman of Hyperloop Transportation Technologies and CEO of Jumpstarter, Inc.

== Career ==
=== Early career ===
In 1993, his career started as an investment specialist in Berlin, Germany.

When he was 19 years old, he quit his job in the bank.

In the 1990s, after moving to Italy, Ahlborn founded several companies in the alternative energy and interior design sphere. Ahlborn left Europe and joined the Girvan Institute of Technology, a non-profit incubator, and co-working space. The institute, located in Southern California, was created to assist NASA's Ames Research Center. While working on his kitchenware company, he started thinking about ways to apply the co-working notions elsewhere.

=== JumpStarter, Inc ===
He co-founded and became CEO of Jumpstarter in 2013, the company that developed the crowdsourcing platform JumpStartFund in El Segundo, California.
