= Hyperloop Transportation Technologies =

American research company

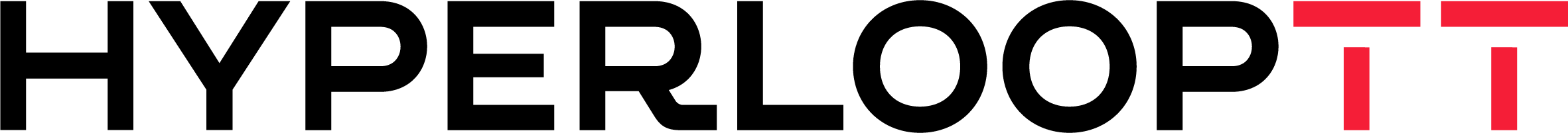
- Type: Private
- Industry: Public transport; Crowdsourcing
- Founded: November 2013; 12 years ago
- Headquarters: Playa Vista, California, U.S.
- Key people: Andrés de León, CEO; Dirk Ahlborn, Co-Founder and Chairman; Bibop Gresta, Co-Founder and former Chairman
- Number of employees: 50
- Website: www.hyperlooptt.com

Hyperloop Transportation Technologies, also known as HyperloopTT, is an American research company formed using a crowd collaboration approach (a mix of team collaboration and crowdsourcing) to develop around the world commercial transportation systems based on the Hyperloop concept.

The concept of the Hyperloop was popularized in 2013 by Elon Musk, not affiliated with HyperloopTT. The project was to develop a high speed, intercity transporter using a low pressure tube train which would reach a top speed of 800 miles per hour (1,300 km/h) with a yearly capacity of 15 million passengers.

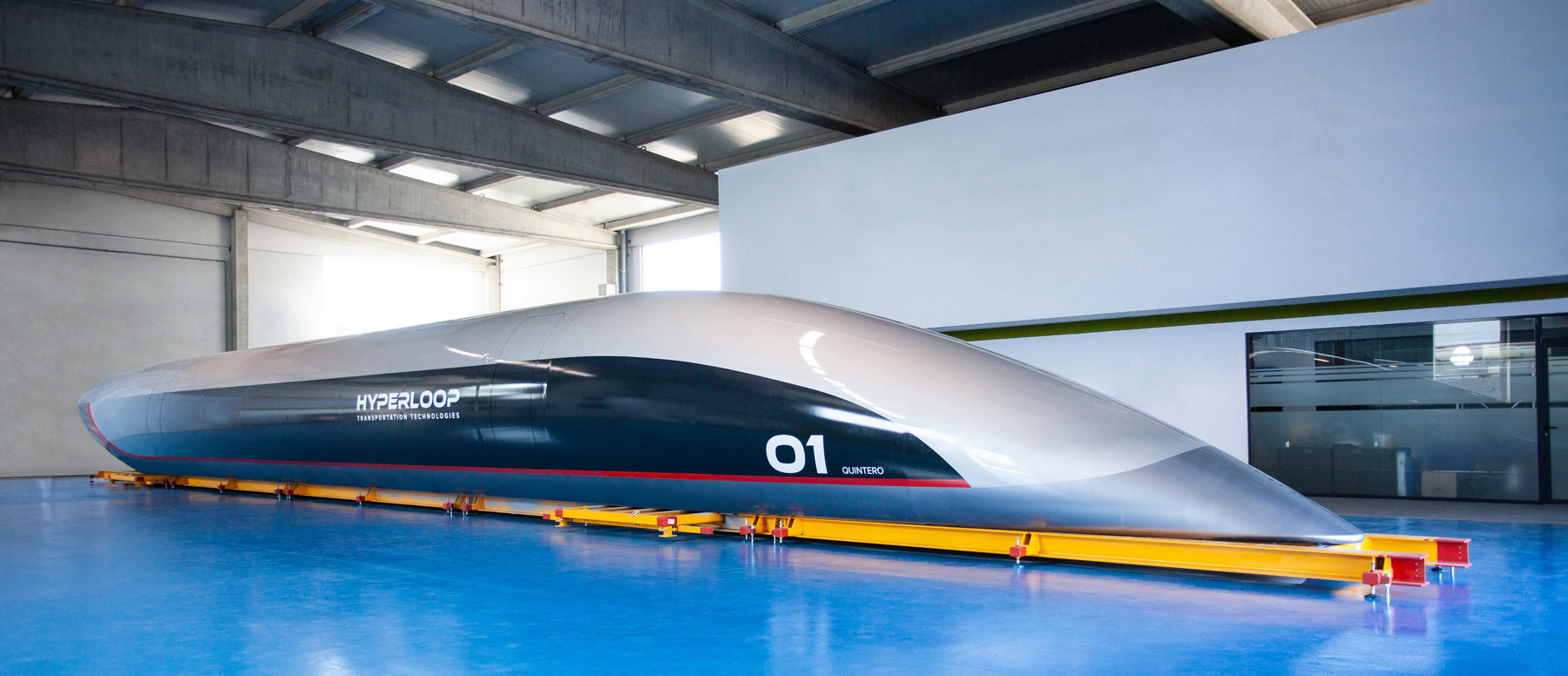
HyperloopTT's Quintero One

== History ==
=== JumpStarter, Inc ===
The company was founded by JumpStarter, Inc., utilizing the company's crowdfunding and collaboration platform JumpStartFund.

In 2013, HyperloopTT announced partnered with Ansys, GloCal Network and UCLA's Architecture & Urban Design program to aide in the early-stage development of feasibility testing, supply chain management and station experience.

=== Early routes ===
The company was not focused on the Los Angeles-to-San Francisco route that was the baseline of the Hyperloop Alpha design from 2013, and considered other routes.

In 2015, HyperloopTT signed an agreement with GROW Holdings, the developer of Quay Valley, California, to construct a 5-mile (8 km) demonstration track beginning in 2016.

Also in August 2015, HyperloopTT announced partnerships with international engineering design and construction giant Aecom and Oerlikon, the world's oldest vacuum technology specialist. AECOM began providing services to HyperloopTT for the design of the full-scale Quay Valley prototype track.

Construction on this demonstration track in Quay Valley never started as GROW Holdings lacked the funds to continue the new community development and stopped all development in the valley.

=== Early agreements ===
In 2016 then HyperloopTT CEO, Dirk Ahlborn, announced an agreement with the Slovak government to perform feasibility studies regarding routes connecting Vienna, Austria to Bratislava, Slovakia, and Bratislava to Budapest, Hungary. Total costs for this project are estimated to be US$200–300 million. The resulting annual system capacity is projected to be 10 million passengers. The company announced in March 2016 that they would be using passive Inductrack systems for their titular Hyperloop. However, in August 2018 the agreement expired after the Office of the Deputy Prime Minister and HyperloopTT didn't reach an agreement to continue the project.

In September 2017, HyperloopTT signed an agreement with the Andhra Pradesh State Government in India to build a Hyperloop between the cities of Amaravati and Vijaywada. The two-phase project would begin with a 6-month feasibility study which would be followed by actual construction.

In July 2018, HyperloopTT announced an agreement to create a joint venture with the government of China's southwestern province of Guizhou to construct a 10 km long Hyperloop track in the city of Tongren.

=== Funding ===
In 2016, HyperloopTT had raised $31.8 million in cash and received $77 million in man-hours, services rendered, land rights usage and future in-kind investments. A 2020 Forbes article stated that HyperloopTT had received a total of $50 million in-cash investments since founding, compared to Virgin Hyperloop's $350 million.

In a letter to shareholders obtained by Fortune in 2024, CEO Andrés de León stated the company was in financial trouble, having not paid employee salaries for months.

=== Move to Venice ===
HyperloopTT stated in a 2024 press release the company was moving from its Toulouse headquarters to offices outside of Venice in the first half of 2024.

== Current prototypes ==
HyperloopTT is currently operating or designing four prototypes.

=== Toulouse ===
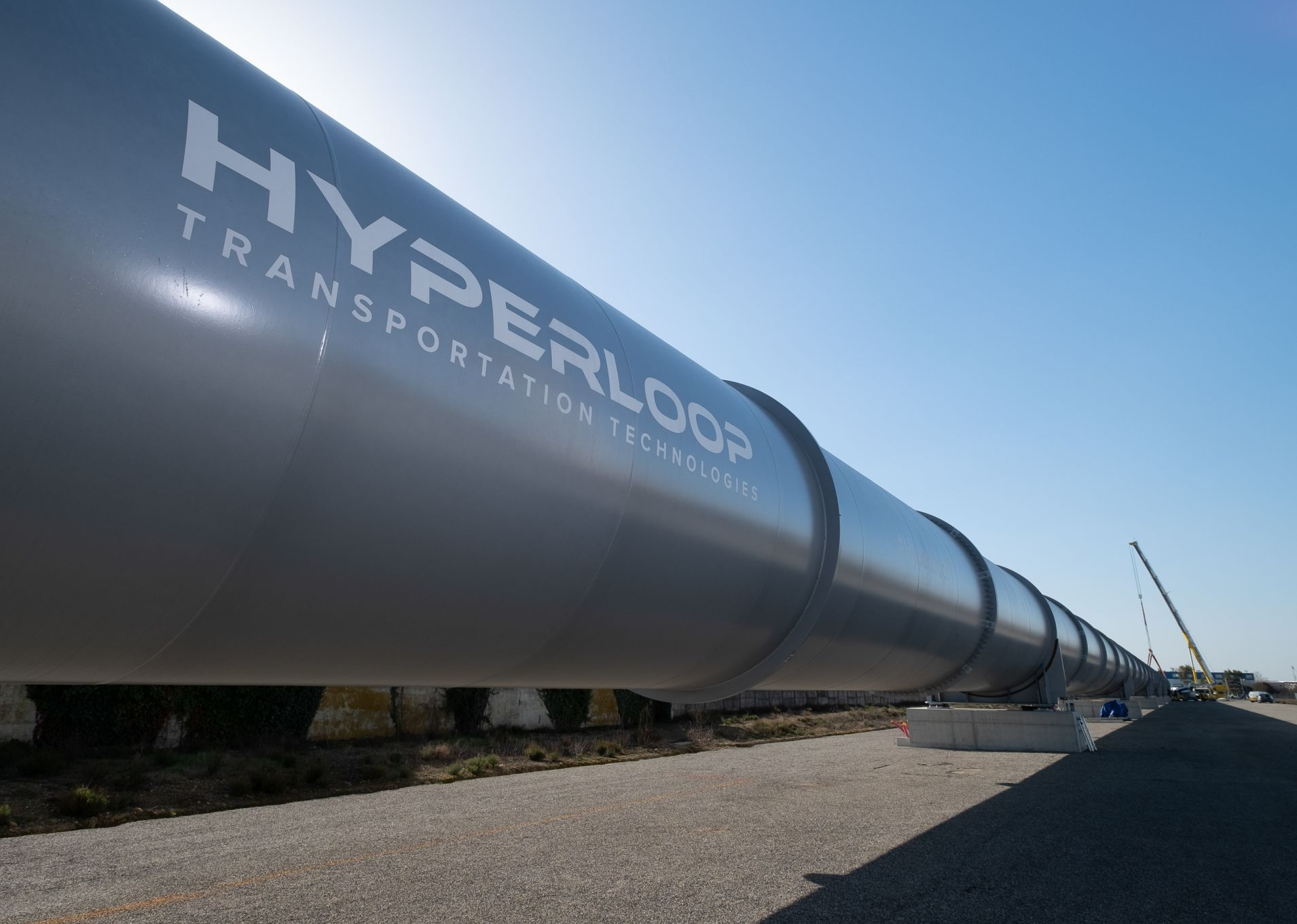
Test track in Toulouse, France

From 2017 to 2023, HyperloopTT had an agreement with the city council of Toulouse and established a research and development center to test hyperloop-related technologies at the Francazal Airport, in the heart of the renowned "Aerospace Valley". Construction began on the 320-meter long test system in April 2018. The completed test-track was 4 meters in diameter which made it the world's only full-scale hyperloop test track.

By 2022, the site appeared to be shut down with no development or testing activities taking place. In November 2023, Hyperloop TT was evicted from the site due to inactivity, with the test track being dismantled in the following months.

=== Abu Dhabi ===
In November 2016, HyperloopTT signed an agreement with the Abu Dhabi Department of Municipal Affairs and Transportation to conduct a feasibility study for a hyperloop system connecting the cities of Abu Dhabi and Al Ain. In 2017, HyperloopTT and the Office of His Highness Sheikh Falah Bin Zayed Al Nahyan signed a strategic partnership agreement accelerating the development of the system to create an innovative infrastructure in line with the Abu Dhabi 2030 vision. The study was completed in 2018, and according to Professor Sabih Gatea Khisaf, has shown the system is "feasible, can be implemented, and is cheaper than high-speed trains. Travel between Abu Dhabi and Al Ain would take just from 10 to 20 minutes."

In 2018, HyperloopTT and Aldar Properties signed an agreement to develop the first 10-kilometer section of a system between Abu Dhabi and Dubai. The system was expected to be operational by 2023, and is still in progress as of 2024, after plans were delayed due to the COVID-19 pandemic.

=== Great Lakes ===
In February 2018, HyperloopTT announced a public-private partnership with the Northeast Ohio Areawide Coordinating Agency (NOACA) metropolitan planning organization and the Illinois Department of Transportation for the development of the United States’ first interstate hyperloop system in the Great Lakes megaregion. The project, which initially only focused on connecting Cleveland to Chicago, expanded in 2019 to include Pittsburgh, as HyperloopTT looks to create the first part of a national network that would connect the Midwest to the east coast through Pittsburgh.

The audio branding company DFAD developed audio identity and acoustics design for HyperloopTT's capsules and stations. This included overall audio environment including implementation of sound, music, voiceovers into prototypes, soundscape systems for passenger well-being and comfort, sound for the infotainment system, audio UX, safety alerts, system notifications, optimized for functional design.

The Great Lakes project resulted in the world's most comprehensive hyperloop feasibility study demonstrating that the system would, “not only be a boon to communities along the travel corridors but also would be a strong business investment.” The study projected development costs of about $40 billion, but would see a $30 billion profit in the first 25 years of operation. The study also predicted a 931,745 increase in jobs, $74.8 billion increase in property values, and an expanded tax base that would generate $12.7 billion in government revenue from 2025 to 2050.

The report also projected that the renewable powered emission-free hyperloop system proposed by HyperloopTT would eliminate 143 million tons of carbon dioxide emissions by replacing air, car, and rail transit along the corridor.

As of 2023, HyperloopTT Chief Marketing Officer Rob Miller maintained the Cleveland stage of the project was on track to be completed before the end of the 2020s.

=== Hamburg ===
In 2018, HyperloopTT announced the creation of a joint venture with Hamburger Hafen und Logistik Aktiengesellschaft (HHLA) the leading container terminal operator in the Port of Hamburg. The project aims to build a 100-meter test track to test the cargo system before expanding the system to connect the port with an inland container yard to alleviate port congestion. In 2019, HyperloopTT announced a partnership with the Gaussin Group, a French autonomous vehicle company, to create the AIV HyperloopTT electric self-driving vehicles that will cost-efficiently carry and transfer containers for the fully automated Hyperloop Cargo System.

=== Venice ===
HyperloopTT is involved in the development of a Hyperloop system in Venice through its subsidiary Hyperloop Italia, which leads the Hyper Builders consortium alongside Italian engineering firms Webuild, Leonardo, and RINA. Hyper Builders won a multiple stage contract for a hyperloop link between Venice and Padua in May 2023, with the first stage entailing the completion of a feasibility study, looking into the feasibility of a 10-kilometer prototype between Venice-Mestre and Padua. If all stages are completed, HyperloopTT aims to have a fully functional system operating by 2030, however the project does not have to be continued upon completion of the feasbility study.

== See also ==
- List of crowdsourcing projects
