= Bibop Gresta =

Italian business executive

Bibop G. Gresta
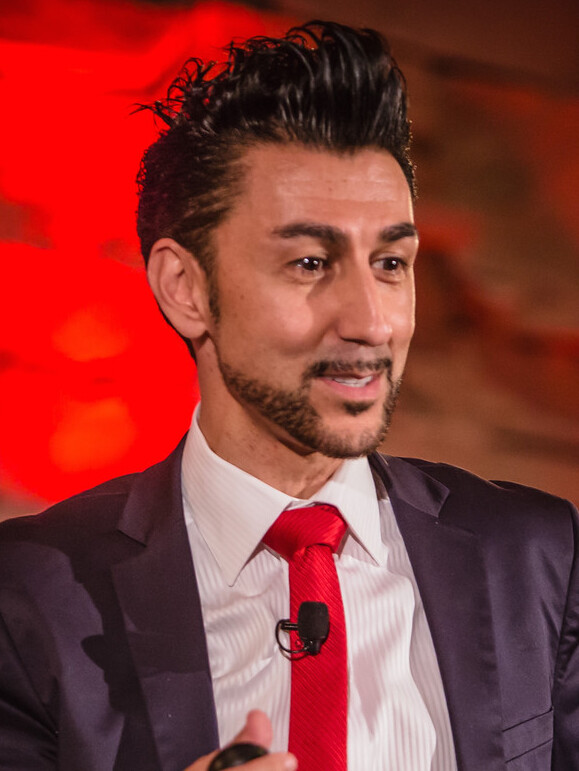
- Born: October 23, 1971 (age 54); Terni, Italy
- Education: University of Siena, University of Milan
- Occupation: Business executive
- Known for: Co-founding Hyperloop Transportation Technologies, Founding Hyperloop Italia
- Website: bibop.com

Bibop Gresta (born Gabriele Gresta) is an Italian business executive. He is the co-founder and former chairman of Hyperloop Transportation Technologies and the founder and CEO of Hyperloop Italia.

== Early life ==
At the age of 15, he was the director of software development at the Italian division of Alpha Center (an American company). He worked as a TV writer and appeared on the Italian version of MTV.

== Entrepreneurial career ==
He founded Bibop, S.p.A., a content production and distribution company. In 1999 he sold 40% of the company to Telecom Italia for 11 bln Italian lira. He co-founded the startup incubator Digital Magics, responsible for the startup of more than 70 companies. In 2011, he entered the venture capital market sitting on the board of two stock listed companies in the U.K. and Germany.

He was involved with a number of startups and new-media ventures, until moving to the United States in 2013. At the end of 2013 he co-founded Hyperloop Transportation Technologies, and has since appeared widely as a speaker extolling the technology.

== Hyperloop Transportation Technologies ==
Hyperloop Transportation Technologies was the first to begin the development of the Hyperloop.
