= Antonio Gresta =

Italian painter (1671–1727)

- Born: 1671; Ala, Prince-Bishopric of Trent
- Died: 1727 (aged 55–56); Bruchsal, Baden-Württemberg, Germany
- Occupation: Painter

Antonio Gresta (1671 in Ala, Trentino – 1727 in Bruchsal) was a painter from the Holy Roman Empire.

Gresta apparently trained in Verona and Venice. Among his works are frescoes in the church of the Carmine in Trento. Along with the painter-sculptor Gaspare Antonio Baroni di Cavalcabò, he helped decorate the church of the Santissimi Trinità in Sacco near Rovereto; the Palazzi Pizzini and Taddei in Ala; and the bishop's residence in Bressanone. Gresta painted altarpieces for parish churches in Ala. A year before his death, he traveled to the German town of Bruchsal to become court painter.
