= Sir Thomas Dyer, 7th Baronet =

Lieutenant-General Sir Thomas Richard Swinnerton Dyer, 7th Baronet (5 February 1768 – 12 April 1838) was an English soldier.

== Early life ==
Dyer was born on 5 February 1768 and was baptised at St John the Evangelist, Westminster on 16 March 1768. He was the only son of Colonel Sir John Swinnerton Dyer, 6th Baronet and Susannah Vicary (a daughter Henry Vicary of Windsor). Dyer had three sisters, Elizabeth Mary Dyer, Eleanor Dyer, and Elizabeth Dyer, who all died unmarried.

His paternal grandparents were Sir Thomas Dyer, 5th Baronet and Elizabeth Jones (a daughter of Major Jones). His paternal uncle, Thomas Dyer, married Mary Smith (daughter of Richard Smith of Islington), and was the father of Thomas Swinnerton Dyer (who died without legitimate male issue), Maj.-Gen. Sir John Dyer of the Royal Artillery (father of Sir Thomas Swinnerton Dyer, 9th Baronet), and Edward Dyer.

== Career ==
Dyer was Colonel in the Foot Guards, and served as equerry to George, Prince of Wales (later King George IV), Prince Edward, Duke of Kent (father of Queen Victoria) and Prince Ernest, Duke of Cumberland (later King of Hanover). He also served as aide-de-camp to Sir Ralph Abercromby at the Battle of Alexandria in the Egyptian campaign and aide-de-camp to Sir John Moore. Dyer was present at Moore's death during the Battle of Corunna. He also a Lieutenant-General with the Spanish Army, earning the name "Father of the Unfortunate Spaniards", and was awarded the Knight Grand Cross of the Order of Saint Hermenegild and Order of Isabella the Catholic.

Upon the death of his father on 21 March 1801, he succeeded as the 7th Baronet Dyer, of Tottenham. Dyer had a house in Clarges Street, Piccadilly, and inherited the Westhope Estate, of which he was Lord of the manor, and the London properties of his father.

== Personal life ==
On 14 April 1814, Dyer married Elizabeth Standerwick (1780–1864) at South Stoneham, Hampshire. She was the only daughter and heiress of Elizabeth and James Standerwick of Ovington Park. During their marriage, they lived primarily at Ovington Park, which his wife inherited from her father.

Sir Thomas died in Clarges Street, Mayfair, on 12 April 1838 at age 70. He was buried at Ovington churchyard, near Alresford, where his widow had erected a "tomb as a memorial of her affection and gratitude." As he died without issue, he left his entire estate to his widow, but was succeeded in the baronetcy by his same-named cousin, naval officer Thomas Swinnerton Dyer, of Park Street. After his death, his widow married German Baron Friedrich von Zandt in May 1839. (Note: Upon her death at Schloss Seehof in 1864, Baroness von Zandt left her London Dyer property, Bank-Chambers, Tokenhouse Yard, Fenchurch Street, Mark Lane, Star Alley, Dyer's Court, lands in Aldermanbury, Thames Street and Brompton, Pimlico, Kingsland Road, and Kent Road to Sir Thomas Swinnerton Dyer, 9th Baronet (1799–1878); the Dyer property of the Manor of Westhope and all lands in Shropshire, to Capt. Henry Clement Swinnerton Dyer (1834–1898) (second son of the 9th Baronet); the lands in Thames Street and Silver Street, London to Thomas Richard Dyer (son of Capt. Edward Dyer, descendant of Edward Dyer, fourth son of Sir Thomas Dyer, 5th Baronet); No. 4 Park Place, Westminster St James to Peter Dickson for life (then to Sir Thomas Swinnerton Dyer, 9th Baronet); Malden, Essex to his kinsman William Hammond; Ovington Park, Itchen Stoke, Titchborne Beauworth in Hampshire to Emma Elizabeth Hammond, daughter of Mrs. Emma Hammond, widow, her cousin; and messuages in Albemarle Street, Grillion's Hotel, Clarges Street Mansion, all contents of the house to her cousin. She mentions her cousin Sarah Ayres Mrs Frances Gamlen widow of Charles Arthur.)

== Notes ==
Baronetage of England
Preceded by John Swinnerton Dyer	Baronet (of Tottenham); 1801–1838	Succeeded by Thomas Swinnerton Dyer
