= Friedrich von Zandt =

Prussian Hussar colonel and landowner

Friedrich, Freiherr von Zandt (1785 – 5 March 1842) was a Prussian Hussar colonel and landowner who served as chamberlain to the King of Bavaria.

== Early life ==
Zandt was born in 1785 and was from Würzburg, Germany.

== Career ==
Baron von Zandt and his wife owned the freehold property in central London's Knightsbridge district located between Brompton Road to the north-west and Walton Street to the south-east. After his death, the property was developed into a garden square by his widow in 1844, who named it Ovington Square after their house in Ovington, Hampshire. The houses surrounding the green were built from 1844 to 1850 by W.W. Pocock. While protected under the Garden Square Act and maintained under the Kensington Improvement Act, both from 1851, responsibility for the garden passed to Trustees following a settlement made by Sir John Dyer, 12th Baronet in 1912.

=== Schloss Seehof ===
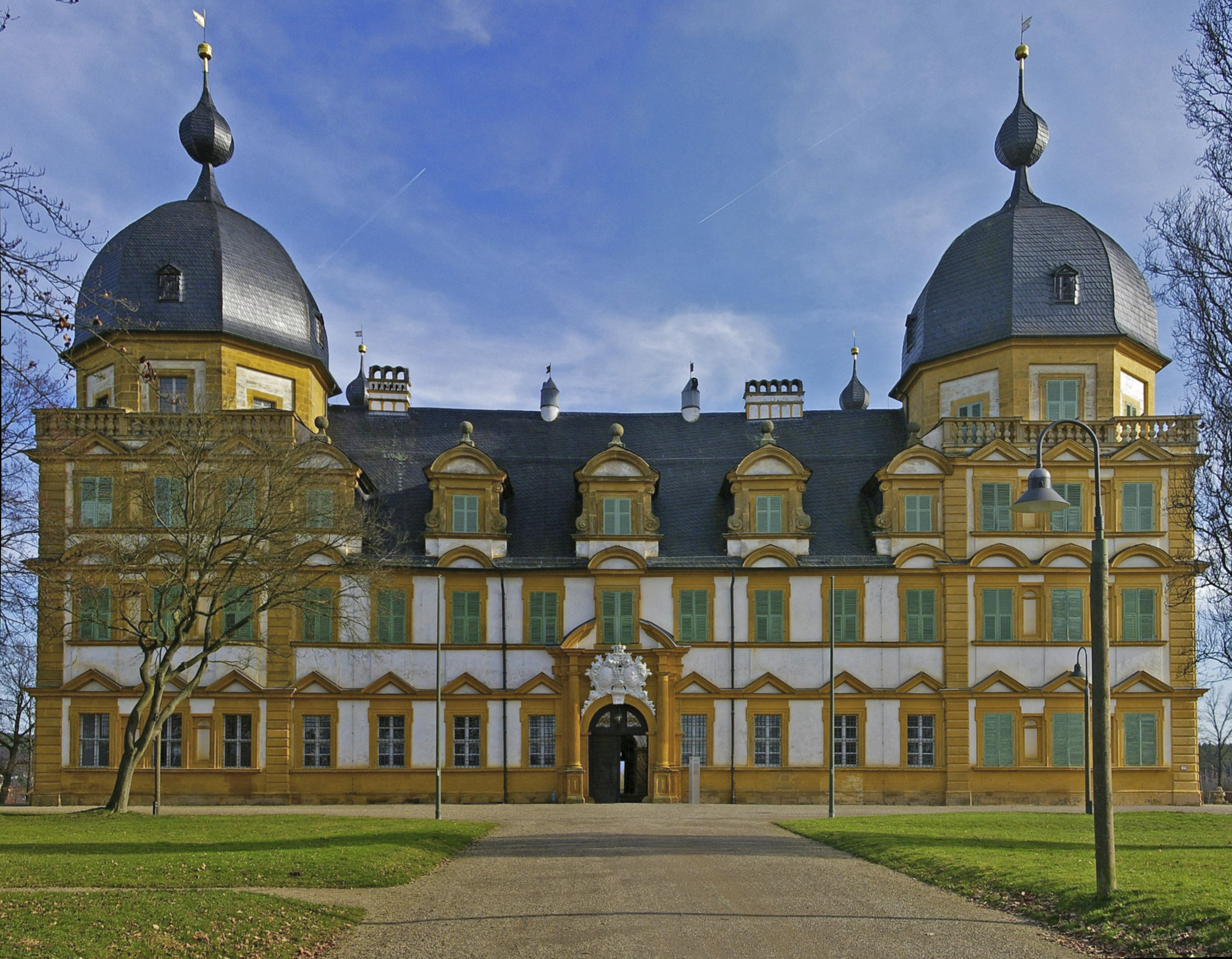
Schloss Seehof

In c. 1840–1841, Baron von Zandt acquired Schloss Seehof in Memmelsdorf, Bamberg, which had been built in the late 1600s as a summer residence and hunting lodge for Marquard Sebastian Schenk von Stauffenberg, Prince-bishop of Bamberg. Before von Zandt, the castle and garden had been owned by the Wittelsbach family who acquired it after secularization in 1803. The property remained in the von Zandt family until the death of the last male heir, Baron Franz Joseph von Zandt, who drowned in the castle pond in 1951, after which it was sold to the von Hessberg (German: Heßberg) family. In 1975, the Free State of Bavaria acquired the property and restored it, and today is administered by the Bavarian Administration of State-Owned Palaces, Gardens and Lakes.

== Personal life ==
On 30 May 1839, Baron von Zandt married Elizabeth Standerwick (1780–1864), the widow and heiress of Lt.-Gen. Sir Thomas Dyer, 7th Baronet (who died in 1838) who was the only daughter and heir of James and Elizabeth Standerwick. They lived at Ovington House in Hampshire which had been built for Elizabeth's father.

Baron von Zandt died unexpectedly at Seehof on 5 March 1842, and was buried in the von Zandt family vault in Memmelsdorf near Bamberg. His widow, and the heir of all his property, died at Seehof on 27 May 1864. As they had no children, Schloss Seehof was left to her husband's relative, Walther, Baron von Zandt, and legacies to Baroness Caroline von Zandt (daughter of General Maximilian von Zandt). (Note: Upon her death, Baroness von Zandt left her London Dyer property, Bank-Chambers, Tokenhouse Yard, Fenchurch Street, Mark Lane, Star Alley, Dyer's Court, lands in Aldermanbury, Thames Street and Brompton, Pimlico, Kingsland Road, and Kent Road to Sir Thomas Swinnerton Dyer, 9th Baronet (1799–1878); the Dyer property of the Manor of Westhope and all lands in Shropshire, to Capt. Henry Clement Swinnerton Dyer (1834–1898) (second son of the 9th Baronet); the lands in Thames Street and Silver Street, London to Thomas Richard Dyer (son of Capt. Edward Dyer, descendant of Edward Dyer, fourth son of Sir Thomas Dyer, 5th Baronet); No. 4 Park Place, Westminster St James to Peter Dickson for life (then to Sir Thomas Swinnerton Dyer, 9th Baronet); Malden, Essex to his kinsman William Hammond; Ovington Park, Itchen Stoke, Titchborne Beauworth in Hampshire to Emma Elizabeth Hammond, daughter of Mrs. Emma Hammond, widow, her cousin; and messuages in Albemarle Street, Grillion's Hotel, Clarges Street Mansion, all contents of the house to her cousin. She mentions her cousin Sarah Ayres Mrs Frances Gamlen widow of Charles Arthur.)
