= Westhope, Shropshire =

Coordinates: 52.472°N 2.781°W

Westhope
- Location within Shropshire
- Civil parish: Diddlebury
- Unitary authority: Shropshire
- Ceremonial county: Shropshire
- Region: West Midlands
- Country: England
- Sovereign state: United Kingdom
- Police: West Mercia
- Fire: Shropshire
- Ambulance: West Midlands

Westhope is a small village in Shropshire, England.

== History ==
Historically, the manor of Westhope was centred by a house to the east of the church. It passed from the de Say family, under-tenants of Roger de Montgomery, through Isabella de Say (the only surviving child of Helias de Say, 3rd Lord of Clun), into the hands of the FitzAlan family through her marriage to William FitzAlan, Lord of Oswestry. The FitzAlans, later Earls of Arundel, held it until 1561, when it was acquired by the Crown. In 1568, Westhope was acquired by Leonard Dannett of Dannett's Hall, Leicestershire. Dannett's family had lived on the estate when it was owned by the Arundels. After Dannett's death, his brother, Sir John Dannett, succeeded to the estate, but it was sold to Henry Fleming in 1655 under the will of his successor, Thomas Dannett, to pay his debts.

Fleming was a member of the family affiliated with Shadwell, and later with Sibdon Castle. The estate remained in his family until it was inherited by Elizabeth (née Fleming) Harries, the surviving sister of Edward Fleming, who was murdered in 1773. From Elizabeth, it passed in 1782 to Col. Sir John Dyer, 6th Baronet (1738–1801). The family of Sir John, a Groom of the Bedchamber to the Prince of Wales (later King George III), was originally from Heytesbury, Wiltshire. Sir John "became first Lord of Westhope in 1792" and was succeeded in his estates by his son, Sir Thomas Dyer, 7th Baronet. Upon his death, Westhope was left to his wife, Elizabeth, Lady Dyer (née Standerwick). After the 7th Baronet's death, she married Baron Friedrich von Zandt, who owned Schloss Seehof at Bamburg and was chamberlain to the King of Bavaria. Upon Baroness von Zandt's death in 1864, Westhope and all Dyer lands in Shropshire, were left to Capt. Henry Clement Swinnerton Dyer (1834–1898), second son of Sir Thomas Dyer, 9th Baronet, and father to Sir Leonard Dyer, 14th Baronet (1875–1947).

=== Westhope Manor ===
Westhope Manor was the country seat of the Dyer family on an estate that had been owned by the family since the 18th century. The manor house was designed by English architect Guy Dawber, known for working in the late Arts and Crafts style. Dawber exhibited "two sets of drawings at the Royal Academy in 1902, shortly after its completion, on a virgin site."
