= Sir John Dyer, 6th Baronet =

British soldier and courtier (1738-1801)

Colonel Sir John Swinnerton Dyer, 6th Baronet (30 November 1738 – 21 March 1801) was a British soldier and courtier who was Groom of the Bedchamber to King George IV when Prince of Wales.

== Early life ==
Dyer was born on 30 November 1738 into a family that originally hailed from Heytesbury, Wiltshire. John, who was baptised at Finchingfield, was the eldest son of Sir Thomas Dyer, 5th Baronet and Elizabeth Jones (a daughter of Major Jones).

His paternal grandparents were Sir John Swinnerton Dyer, 2nd Baronet and Elizabeth Johnson (a daughter of Sir Rowland Johnson). His brother, Thomas Dyer, married Mary Smith (daughter of Richard Smith of Islington), and was the father of Thomas Swinnerton Dyer (who died without legitimate male issue), Maj.-Gen. Sir John Dyer of the Royal Artillery (father of Sir Thomas Swinnerton Dyer, 9th Baronet), and Edward Dyer. Among his extended family were uncles Sir Swinnerton Dyer, 3rd Baronet (who died without male issue) and Sir John Swinnerton Dyer, 4th Baronet (who died unmarried).

== Career ==
Dyer, a Colonel in the Guards of the British Army, was Groom of the Bedchamber to the Prince of Wales (who later became King George IV). He was said to have been "a great friend of HRH the Prince of Wales to whom it is stated he lent 80,000 which was not repaid."

Upon the death of his father on 4 October 1780, he succeeded as the 6th Baronet Dyer, of Tottenham, as well as inheriting Newton Hall, Essex from his father (which he sold) and the London property of his ancestors, the Swinnertons, in St Mary Aldermanbury, St Lawrence Jewry, and Tottenham. In 1782, Elizabeth (née Fleming) Harries left Sir John her entire estate, including the Manor of Westhope in Shropshire, of which he was made Lord of the manor, in 1792.

== Personal life ==
On 9 December 1761, Dyer married Susannah Vicary, a daughter of Henry Vicary of Windsor, at St Vedast Foster Lane. Together, they were the parents of three daughters, Elizabeth Mary Dyer, Eleanor Dyer, and Elizabeth Dyer, who all died unmarried, and one son:

- Sir Thomas Richard Swinnerton Dyer, 7th Baronet (1768–1838), a Lieutenant-General in the British Army who married Elizabeth Standerwick, only daughter and heiress of James Standerwick of Ovington Park. After his death, she married German Baron Friedrich von Zandt.

His wife, Lady Dyer, died on 7 April 1773 and was buried at St Margaret's, Westminster. Sir John died on 21 March 1801 and was buried at the Chancel Vault at Aldermanbury. He was succeeded in the baronetcy by his only son, Thomas.

Baronetage of England
Preceded by Thomas Dyer	Baronet (of Tottenham); 1780–1801	Succeeded by Thomas Richard Swinnerton Dyer
