= Franz Konrad =

Franz Konrad or Conrad may refer to:

- Franz Konrad von Stadion und Thannhausen (1679–1757), Prince-Bishop of Bamberg
- Franz Konrad von Rodt (1706–1775), Bishop of Constance
- Franz Conrad von Hötzendorf (1852–1925), Chief of the General Staff of the Austro-Hungarian Army at the outbreak of World War I
- Franz Konrad (SS officer) (1906–1952)
- Franz Konrad (racing driver) (born 1951)
