= Johann Philipp Anton von Franckenstein =

German Vicar-General and Prince-Bishop

His Grace Johann Philipp Anton von Franckenstein
- Prince-bishop of Bamberg
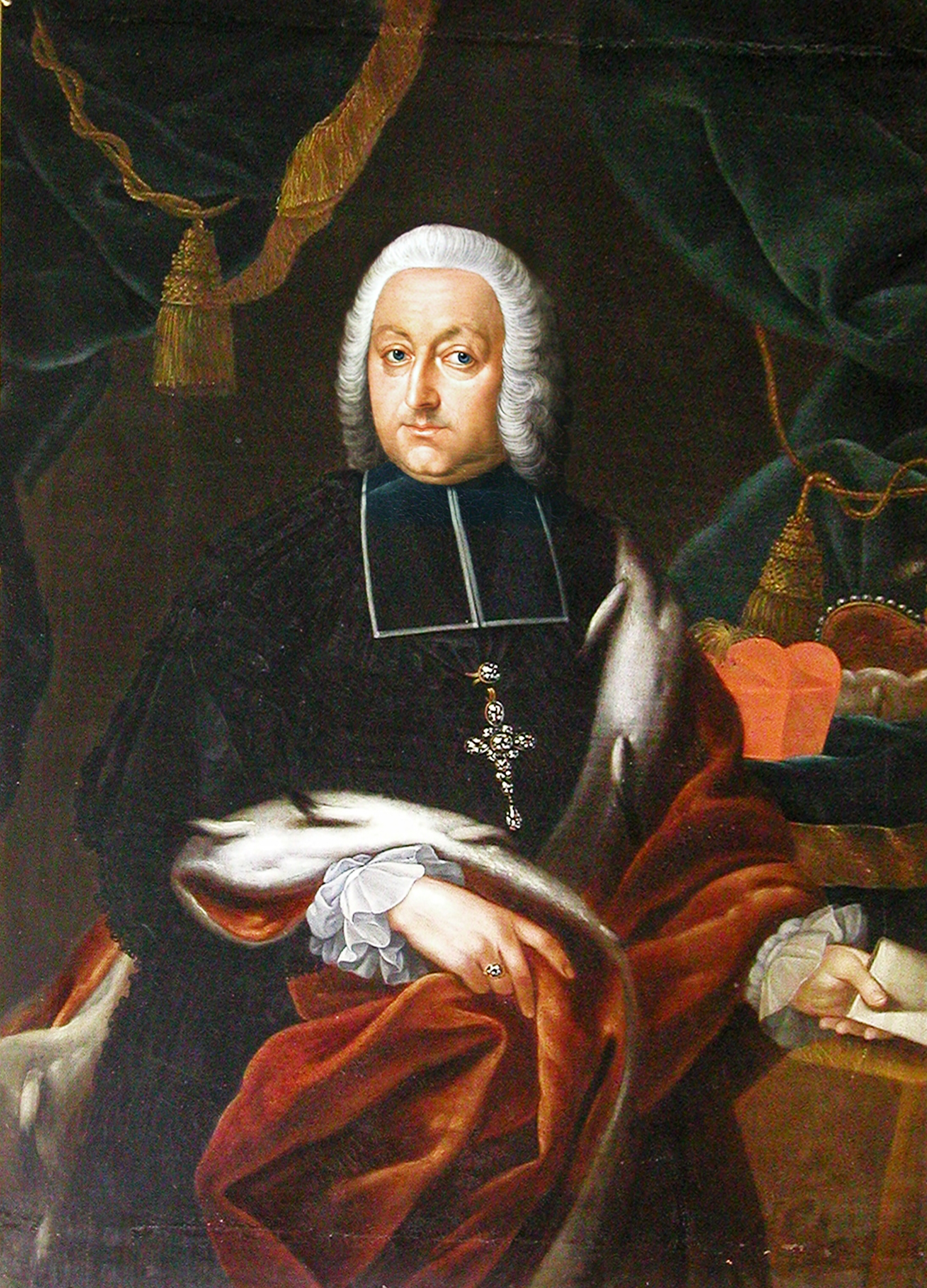
- Johann Philipp Anton von Franckenstein
- Church: Roman Catholic Church
- Archdiocese: Roman Catholic Diocese of Bamberg
- See: Cathedral of Saints Peter and George
- Installed: 20 September 1746
- Term ended: 19 June 1753
- Predecessor: Friedrich Karl von Schönborn
- Successor: Franz Konrad von Stadion und Thannhausen
- Other post: Vicar General of the electorate of Mainz (1743–46)

Personal details
- Born: 27 March 1695 Forchheim, Archbishopric of Bamberg, Holy Roman Empire
- Died: 3 June 1753 (aged 58) Bamberg, Archbishopric of Bamberg, Holy Roman Empire
- Education: Collegium Germanicum, Rome

Johann Philipp Anton Freiherr von und zu Franckenstein, born in Forchheim on 27 March 1695, appointed in 1743 as Vicar-General of Mainz, was from 1746 to 1753 ruling Prince-bishop of Bamberg.

== Biography ==
=== Early life ===
Johann Philipp Anton von Franckenstein was the son of Johannes Freiherr von und zu Frankenstein and his wife Maria Margareta Freiin von Eyb. His great uncles were Johannes Karl von und zu Franckenstein (Prince-Bishop of Worms), Johann Martin von Eyb (Prince Bishop of Eichstätt) und Marquard Sebastian Schenk von Stauffenberg (Prince-Bishop of Bamberg). Philipp Anton grew up in Franconia, studied canon and civil law at the Pontificium Collegium Germanicum et Hungaricum de Urbe in Rome, followed by extensive educational journeys and was appointed canon of Bamberg, shortly after also lord of the cathedral in Würzburg and Mainz.

=== Ecclesiastical career ===
Starting his studies in 1711, Philipp Anton was appointed canon in Bamberg in 1719. Shortly after his nomination he was also accepted as canon by the cathedral chapter of Würzburg and Mainz. On 22 September 1736 Johann Philipp Anton was ordained priest by his predecessor Prince-bishop Friedrich Karl von Schönborn. He celebrated his primacy on 30 October the same year in Ullstadt. As canon of Mainz he participated in a Dalmatian play at the coronation of Emperor Charles VII, Holy Roman Emperor in the Frankfurt Cathedral in 1742, wearing the cross of the crowning archbishop. From 1743 Franckenstein served as Vicar general in the Electorate of Mainz. When Prince-Bishop Friedrich Karl Graf von Schönborn died on 26 July 1746 in Würzburg, Franckenstein was elected bishop of Bamberg and became his successor with Pope Benedict XIV confirming the appointment on 19 December 1746. He received the episcopal ordination on 26 September 1746 and was consecrated bishop on 23 March 1749 by the auxiliary bishop of Bamberg, Heinrich Joseph von Nitschke.

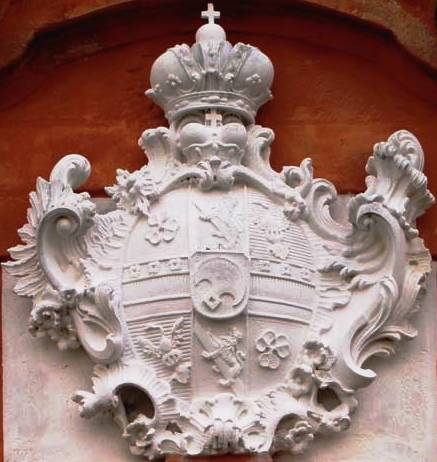
Philipp Anton Franckenstein's arms Seehof Palace

=== Politics and patronage ===
After his election, which was also supported by Empress Maria Theresa (she thanked him for his patriotic sentiments), he quickly reached a settlement with his cathedral chapter as prince-bishop and was able to settle centuries-old disputes.

In 1748, Johann Philipp Anton von Frankenstein appointed the artist Ferdinand Dietz, whom he held in high esteem, as his court sculptor. He also brought the painter Giuseppe Appiani to Bamberg and commissioned him to produce a magnificent large ceiling fresco in the White Hall of Seehof Castle. He also promoted the composer Johann Jakob Schnell, who dedicated one of his better known works to him.

Philipp Anton was benevolent and popular as prince-bishop, he loved Italian arts and architecture and had the residence and Seehof castle considerably enlarged and renewed. His artistic sense, which was characterized by the Late Baroque, is especially praised. He employed well-known artists for the execution of his plans at great cost. As head shepherd of his diocese he took special care of the training of priests, as head of state, he stood on the side of Habsburg and tried to alleviate the turmoil and horrors of the War of the Austrian Succession.

He died on 3 June 1753 in Bamberg and was buried in Bamberg Cathedral. His funeral monument is in Michaelsberg Abbey, Bamberg.

Catholic Church titles
Preceded by Friedrich Karl von Schönborn	Prince-Bishop of Bamberg; 1746–1753	Succeeded by Franz Konrad von Stadion und Thannhausen
