= Westhope (disambiguation) =

Westhope is a notable building in Tulsa, Oklahoma, USA.

Westhope may also refer to:

- Westhope, Herefordshire, England
- Westhope, North Dakota, USA
- Westhope, Shropshire, England
