= Johann Jakob Schnell =

Johann Jakob Schnell (1687 – 21 February 1754) was a German composer, court music director and music publisher.

== Life ==
Schnell belonged to a widely ramified family of musicians that originally came from the Allgäu. His father Bernhard Schnell was footman in the service of the music-loving count Rudolf Franz Erwein von Schönborn in Wiesentheid. In 1714 Schnell became oboist and violinist at the court of Bamberg. In July 1727 he was appointed court and chamber music director by the Bamberg prince-bishop Lothar Franz von Schönborn. Between 1734 and 1753 Schnell also appeared as a publisher of sacred music by other composers.

He died in Bamberg at about the age of 67.

== Some compositions ==
- Sonata a 2 per Viola da Gamba e Violoncello (1722)
- 6 Missa no editae Op. 1 (Bamberg, 1729)
- Sex Parthiae Trisonae Op. 2, seinem Mäzen, dem Dompapitular und Geheimen Rat, Johann Philipp Anton von und zu Frankenstein gewidmet (Erlangen, 1731)
- 6 Concerta commode tractabila for violon principal, strings, organ and orchestra Op. 3 (Erlangen, 1731)
- 6 Sonatae trisonae a diversis intrumentis concertanibus Op. 4
- 6 Trios für Flöte, Violine und B.c.
- Kleine angenehme Tafel-Music Bestehend in VI. Parthien Op. 7
- 3 Vespere Brevis Op. 8 (Bamberg, 1736)
- 6 Neue ernst- und scherzhafte Parthien Op. 9 (Bamberg, 1738)
