= Ovington Square =

Square in London

Coordinates: 51°29′49″N 0°9′54″W

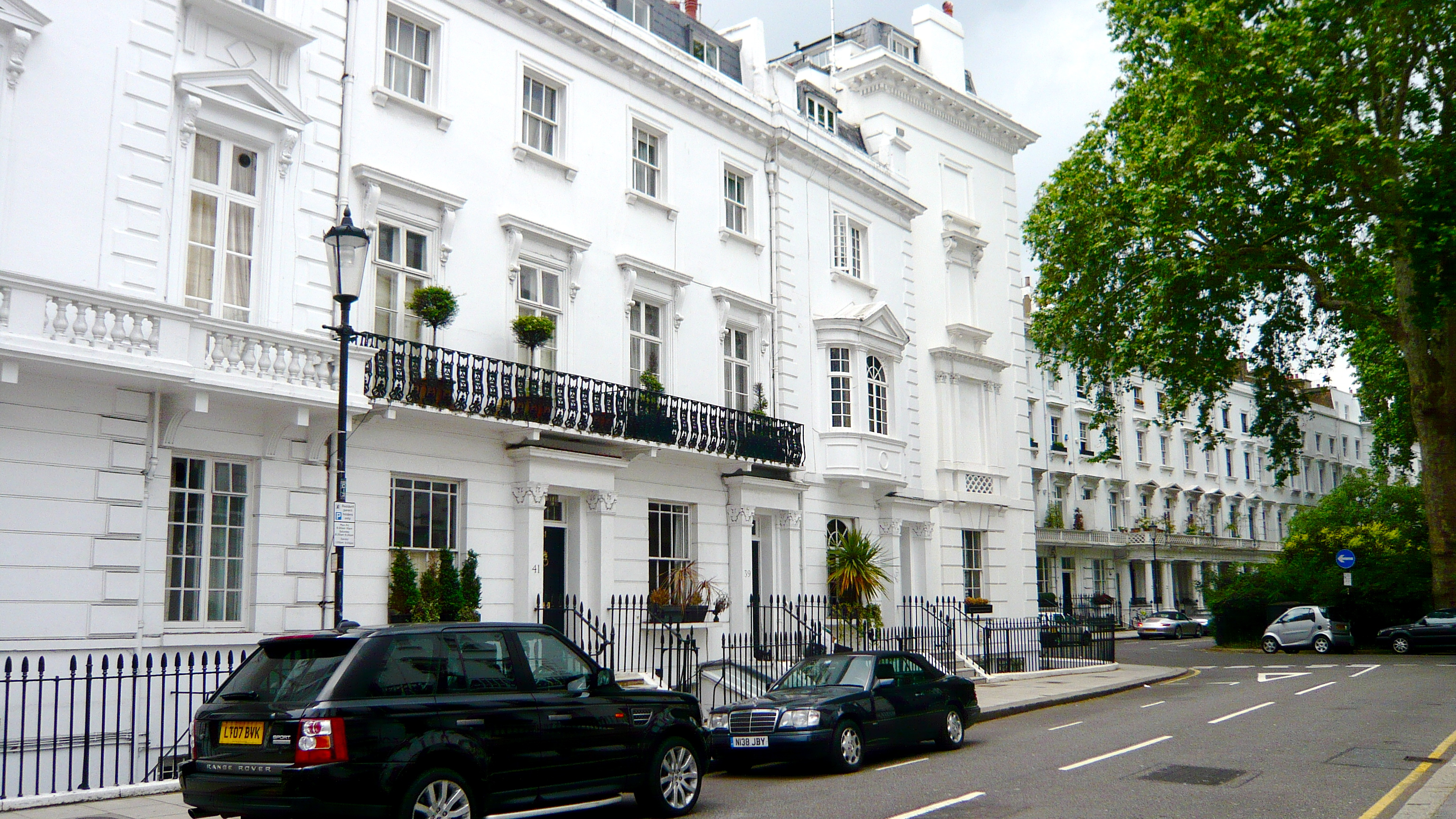
Ovington Square

Ovington Square is a garden square in central London's Knightsbridge district. It lies between Brompton Road to the north-west (reached via Ovington Gardens) and Walton Street to the south-east.

== History ==
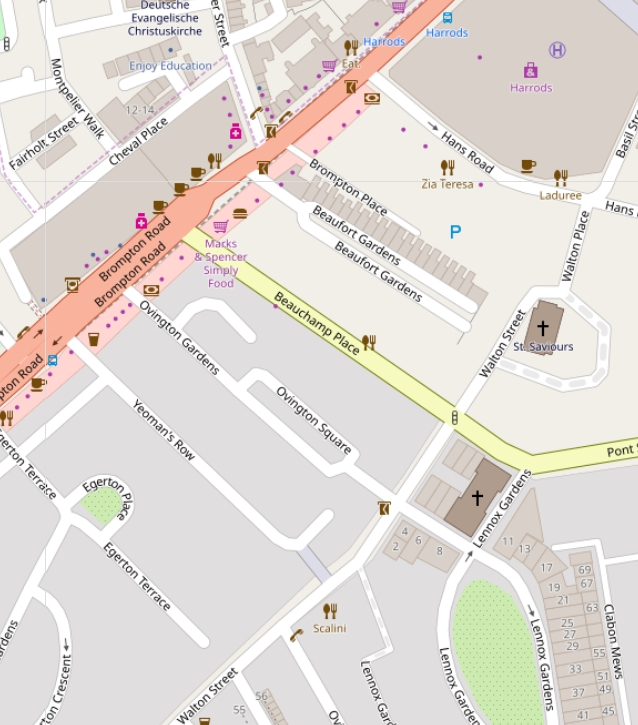
Ovington Square (centre) within Knightsbridge

The freehold property on which the square is built was owned by Frederick, Baron von Zandt of Würzburg, Germany, and after his death was developed in 1844 by his widow, Elizabeth Standerwick, of Ovington House in Hampshire. The houses surrounding the green were built from 1844 to 1850 by W.W. Pocock.

The south side of the square, 1–35, and number 34 on the north side are grade II listed, as are 37–43 and 36–42 on the road into the square.

The green itself was secured soon after development, protected under the 1851 Garden Square Act and maintained under the Kensington Improvement Act 1851 (14 & 15 Vict. c. cxvi). Responsibility for the garden passed to trustees following a settlement made by Sir John Swinnerton Dyer in 1912.

== Notable buildings and residents ==
- #10 was home to the London Buddhist Vihara from 1955 to 1964, when it moved to Heathfield Gardens, Chiswick.
- The six-storey apartment building #22–26 was built in 1957, and the architect was Walter Segal. Pevsner called it "a Morris Traveller parked among grander saloons". In the 1990s, the Twentieth Century Society recommended it for listed building status, but this was rejected.
- #10 Frederic Chapman (1823–1895), publisher, died at his home there
- #17 Birthplace of Vera Bate Lombardi (1883–1948), socialite
- #18 Sir Wilfrid Lawson, 2nd Baronet, of Brayton (1829–1906), temperance campaigner and radical politician died at his home there
- #22 was the home of Ernestine Bowes-Lyon, Baroness de Longueuil, cousin of Elizabeth Bowes-Lyon, the future Queen Elizabeth The Queen Mother.
- #27 Headquarters of the Beatles' Apple Corps and Harrisongs companies
- #31 Mary Frances Ames (1860-1914) author and illustrator of children's books.
- Arthur Grote (1814–1886), colonial administrator, died at his home there
- Jane Wilde lived there from 1879, as did briefly her son, Oscar Wilde
