= St. Peter's Church, Mainz =

Coordinates: 50°00′17″N 8°16′12″E

St. Peter's Church
- Peterskirche
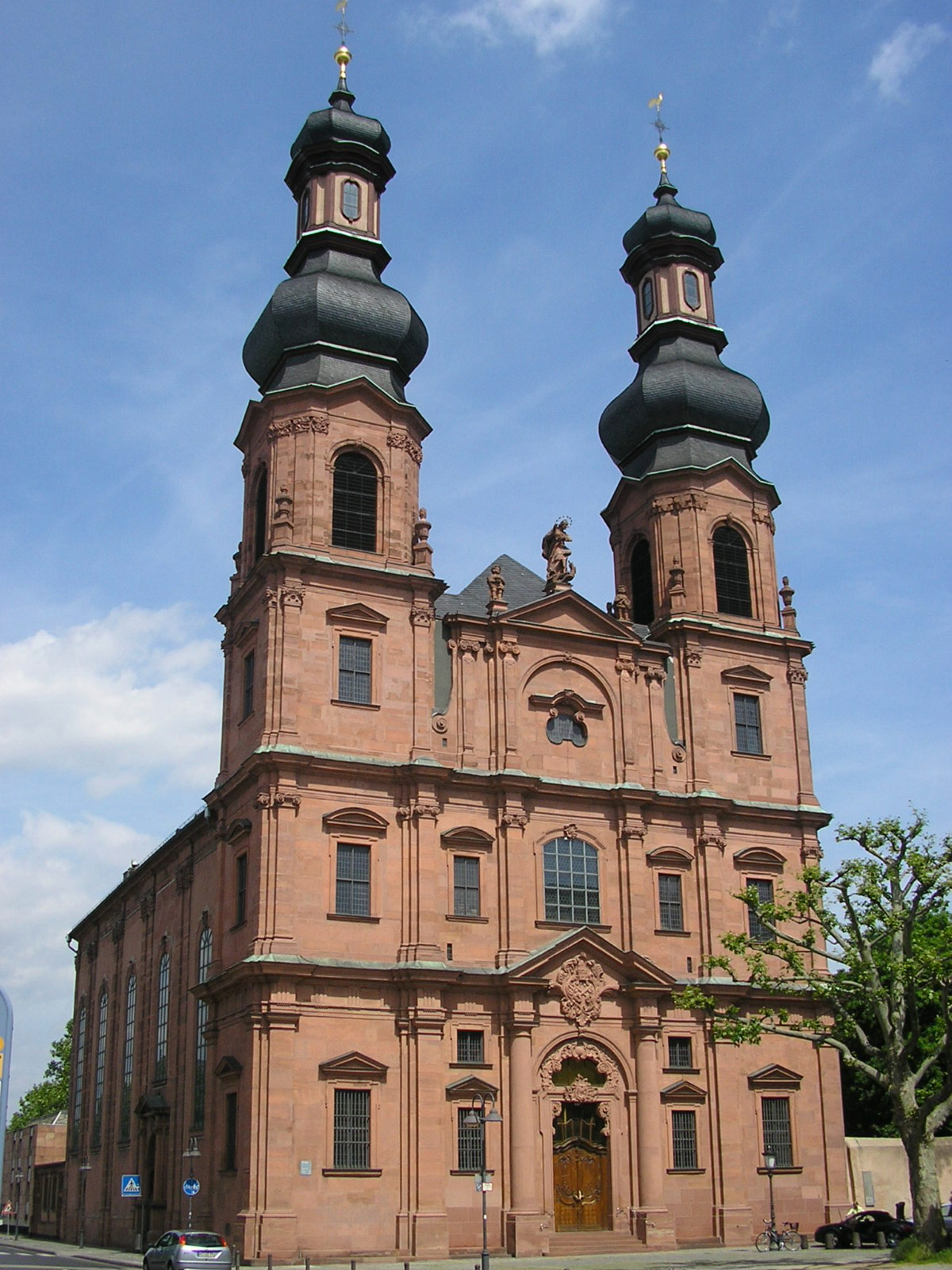
- St. Peter's Church from the southwest
- Interactive map of the St. Peter's Church area

General information
- Architectural style: Rococo
- Location: Mainz, Germany
- Construction started: 1749

St. Peter's Church (in German Peterskirche) is located beneath Deutschhaus Mainz in the northwest of the historical center of Mainz, Germany. It is one of the most important rococo buildings in Mainz. Originally it was a collegiate church monastery of ″St. Peter before the walls″, which had existed since the 10th century and is dedicated to the apostle Peter as patron. Today it serves as a parish church for the parish of St. Peter / St. Emmeran.

== History of the collegiate ==
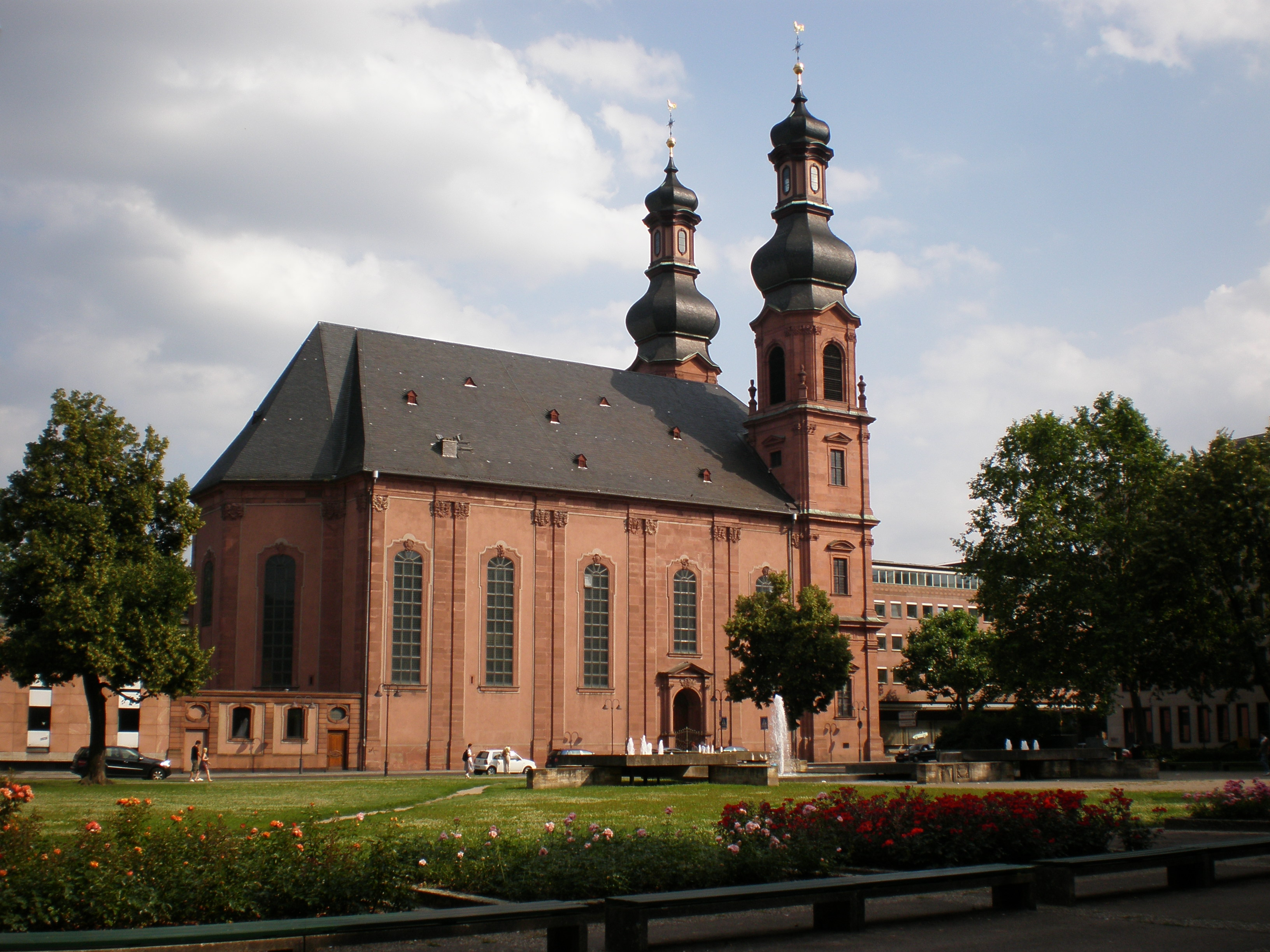
General view via Ernst-Ludwig-Platz to the north-west-façade

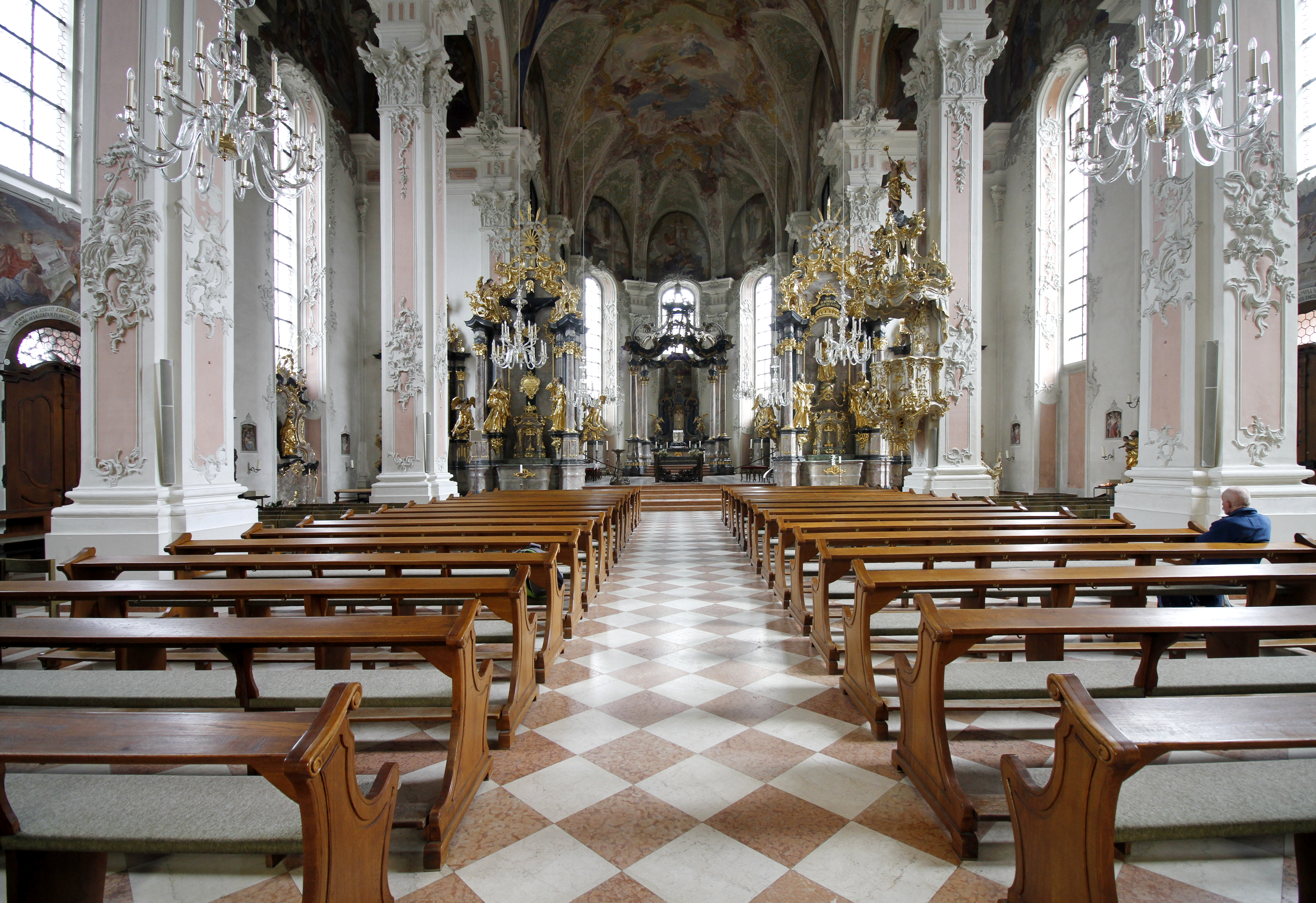
Interior of St. Peter's

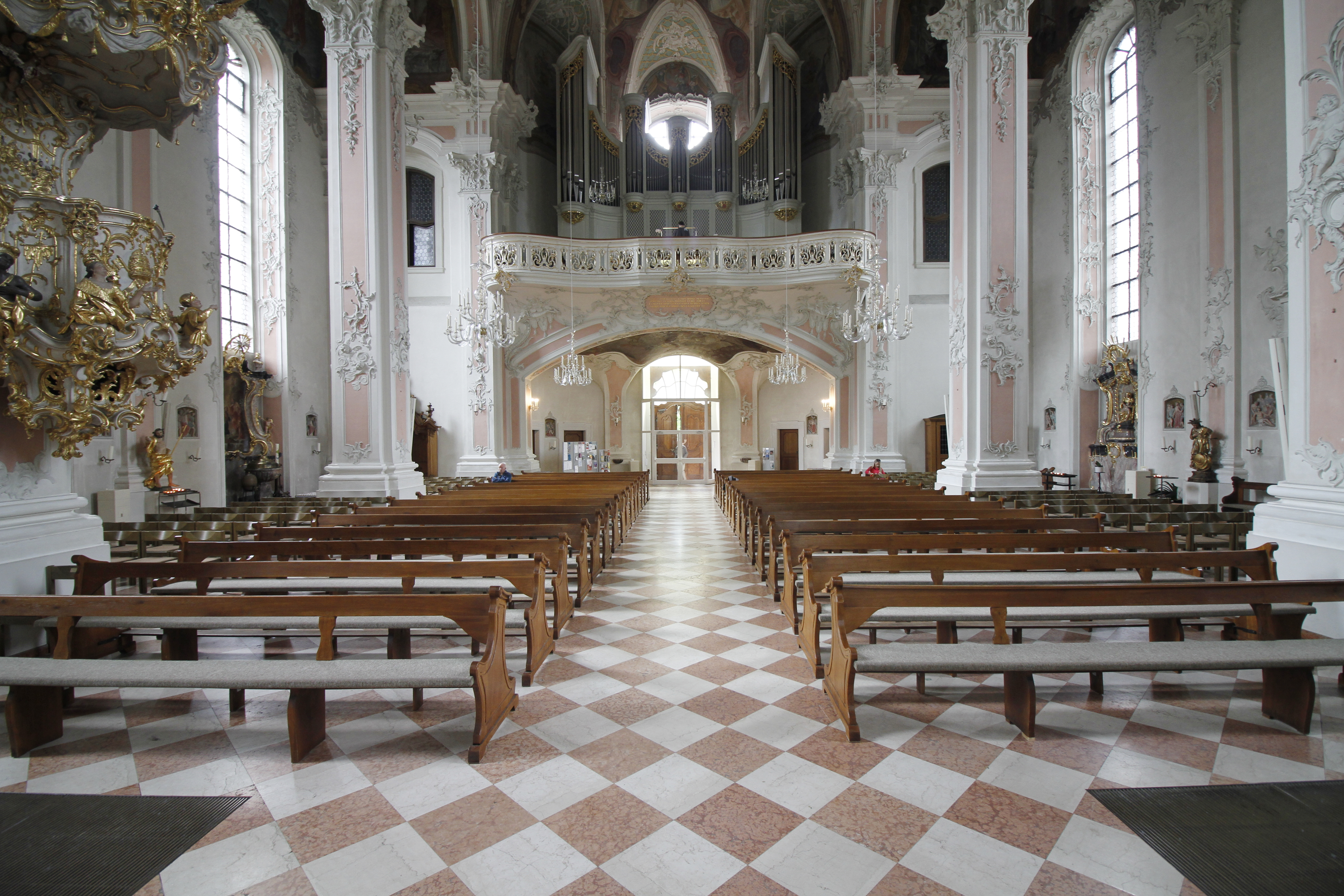
Interior of St. Peter's

The collegiate was founded 944 by archbishop Frederick north of the city wall. Collegiates were key administrative units, on which the archbishop relied. The provosts, the head of the collegiate, each led an archdeacon.

Due to its location before the gates, the collegiate was completely destroyed by Swedish attacks 1631 in the Thirty Years' War, and is to be seen on the north side portal of Saint Peter as paintings, 1631 at the Swedish attacks completely destroyed. At the behest of Archbishop Johann Philipp von Schönborn a reconstruction was not considered. For over a century the collegiate community had no own building. It was only in 1749 Archbishop Johann Friedrich Karl von Ostein decided for a new building. The collegiate was moved to its present location near the palace church St. Gangolph, later vanished in the Napoleonic era. At this location there was previously a romanesque church, the so-called "Odenmünster" or "St. Mari unterm Münster". This has not been used since 1724 and was left to decay.

The construction of the new St. Peter's Church lasted from 1749 to 1756/57, and was carried out in the context of the valorisation of the bleaching district (Bleichenviertel). The church was consecrated 2 May 1756 by Archbishop Johann Friedrich Karl von Ostein. With the beginning of secularization, the collegiate was repealed on 4 July 1802. Due to the fact that Mainz Cathedral lay partially in ruins St. Peter's was chosen for the inauguration of bishop Joseph Ludwig Colmar in 1803.

== The building ==
The present building of St. Peter's is a baroque hall (three bays) with double onion dome tower façade by architect Johann Valentin Thoman. Until 1762 the church was completed yet. Under French occupation, the church became a stable in 1813. When the control of the Fortress of Mainz passed to the German Confederation it became the garrison church of the Prussian garrison parts, which it remained until 1918. Then it was dedicated a parish church. In 1872 Ferdinand Becker painted an altarpiece for the church.

St. Peter had survived the first major air raid on Mainz in August 1942. The second serious attack on Mainz in autumn 1944 had significantly worse consequences. The South Tower was hit by a high explosive bomb and fell onto the nave, where it hit a big hole in the vault. The north tower, the choir room and large parts of the nave, however, were undamaged.

On 27 February 1945, Mainz was almost completely destroyed by air raids with incendiary bombs. St. Peter's Church lost its tower façade, the nave was burnt out. Until 1952 the church was provisionary repaired, so that it could be used by the community. In 1959 the reconstruction began. In 1961, the twin towers were restored to the original. After years of restoration from 1973 to 1989, the church was returned to the parish. During this period the ceiling frescos were created new by Karl Manninger according to old photographs.

The decoration of the church was much irretrievably lost in the original, most notably the organ, the ceiling frescoes from 1755 by Joseph Ignaz Appiani, showing the life and work of St. Peter, and the choir stalls. The great baroque altars, stucco decoration and the most valuable piece of equipment, the great pulpit of Johannes Förster, were not destroyed.

== Recent additions ==
A modern altar of the artist Gernot Rumpf was added recently. It refers to the ″fisher of men″ Peter with a net. Herein, frolicking fish that turn out as people on closer inspection - even one of them with a fool's cap thereunder. The same artist also created the ambo and the Paschal candle. At the 50th anniversary of the death of Father Franz Adam Landvogt, who was pastor at St. Peter, a bronze statue of Karlheinz Oswald was erected in the Landvogt crypt in October 2003.

== Literature ==
- Wilhelm Jung: St. Peter in Mainz. Ehemals Stifts- und Pfarrkirche, Mainz, 1989
