= Sir Thomas Dyer, 9th Baronet =

English baronet and soldier (1799–1878)

Lieutenant-Colonel Sir Thomas Dyer, Bt JP

Personal details
- Born: Thomas Swinnerton Dyer; 10 December 1799 Cottingham, Yorkshire
- Died: 2 October 1878 (aged 78) Chelsea, London
- Spouse: Mary Anne Clement (1832–1878)
- Relations: Sir Thomas Dyer, 7th Baronet (cousin)
- Children: 4
- Parent(s): Sir John Dyer; Jane Halliday
- Education: Royal Military Academy, Woolwich

Military service
- Branch/service: Royal Artillery
- Battles/wars: Peninsular War: • Battle of Badajoz • Battle of Vitoria • Siege of San Sebastian • Battle of the Pyrenees • Battle of the Nive • Battle of Orthez • Battle of Toulouse

Lieutenant-Colonel Sir Thomas Swinnerton Dyer, 9th Baronet JP (10 December 1799 – 2 October 1878) was an English soldier who fought in the Peninsular War.

== Early life ==
Dyer was born on 10 December 1799 and baptised at Cottingham, Yorkshire. He was the son of Jane Halliday and Sir John Dyer, a Major-General in the Royal Artillery, who was killed in 1816.

His paternal grandparents were Thomas Dyer (younger son of Sir Thomas Dyer, 5th Baronet) and Mary Smith (daughter of Richard Smith of Islington). Through his uncle, Sir John Dyer, 6th Baronet, he was a first cousin of Sir Thomas Dyer, 7th Baronet. His maternal grandfather was Simon Halliday of Brompton Hall, London, and Westcombe Park, Kent.

Sir Thomas was educated at the Royal Military Academy, Woolwich.

== Career ==
Dyer entered the Royal Artillery, becoming Captain in 1825. Before retiring in 1832, he was a Lieutenant-Colonel and served in the Peninsular War, where he was present at Badajoz, Vitoria, San Sebastian, the Pyrenees, Nive, Orthez and Toulouse. He also served as Justice of the Peace for Surrey.

Upon the death of his cousin, Sir Thomas Swinnerton Dyer, 8th Baronet, without legitimate male issue on 27 March 1854, he succeeded as the 9th Baronet Dyer, of Tottenham. Upon the 1864 death of Elizabeth, Baroness von Zandt (the wife of his cousin Sir Thomas Dyer, 7th Baronet who married German Baron Friedrich von Zandt after Sir Thomas' death in 1838), he inherited her London Dyer property, Bank-Chambers, Tokenhouse Yard, Fenchurch Street, Mark Lane, Star Alley, Dyer's Court, lands in Aldermanbury, Thames Street and Brompton, Pimlico, Kingsland Road, and Kent Road.

== Personal life ==
On 7 February 1832, Dyer married Mary Anne Clement (1803–1880), a daughter of Margaret Anne (née le Maistre) Clement and Col. John Albeck Clement. Together, they lived at Brompton Hall in London and at Westcroft Park in Chobham, Surrey, and were the parents of:

- Sir Swinnerton Halliday Dyer, 10th Baronet (1833–1882), who fought in the Crimean War and was present at Sevastopol; he married Helen Maria Croker, daughter of Rev. Robert Croker, in 1858.
- Henry Clement Swinnerton Dyer (1834–1898), a Colonel in the Royal Artillery who married Amelia Susan Ward, daughter of John Ward of Otterington Hall and Henrietta Lister-Kaye, (Note: Henrietta Lister-Kaye was the daughter of Sir John Lister Kaye, 1st Baronet and Lady Amelia Grey (a daughter of George Grey, 5th Earl of Stamford and Lady Henrietta Bentinck, herself the daughter of William Bentinck, 2nd Duke of Portland and Margaret Bentinck, Duchess of Portland). After John Ward's death in 1840, Henrietta married Admiral Russell Eliott (son of Sir William Eliott, 6th Baronet) in 1852.) in 1869.
- Frederick Carr Swinnerton Dyer (1837–1896), who married Selenah Maria Ann Richards, daughter of Rev. Edward Windsor Richards (Rector at St. Andrew's, Glamorgan), in 1861. After her death in 1867, he married Frances Margaret Carr, daughter of Sir William Ogle Carr, in 1868.
- Stewart John Dyer (1842–1925), who married Emily Mary Elizabeth Bythesea, daughter of Henry Edmund Bythesea, in 1873.

Sir Thomas died at his residence in Redcliffe Gardens (in the Chelsea area of southwest central London) on 2 October 1878, and was succeeded by his son, Swinnerton.

=== Descendants ===
Through his son Henry, he was a grandfather of Sir Leonard Whitworth Swinnerton Dyer, 14th Baronet (1875–1947), a Sub-Lieutenant in the Royal Navy Volunteer Reserve who fought in World War I.

== Notes ==
Baronetage of England
Preceded by Thomas Swinnerton Dyer	Baronet (of Tottenham); 1854–1878	Succeeded by Swinnerton Halliday Dyer
