= Dyer baronets =

Title in the Baronetage of England

There have been two baronetcies created for persons with the surname Dyer, both in the Baronetage of England. One creation is extant as of 2015.

The Dyer Baronetcy, of Staughton in the County of Huntingdon, was created in the Baronetage of England on 8 June 1627 for Lodowick Dyer, a grandson of Richard Dyer. The title became extinct on his death in 1669.

The Dyer, later Swinnerton-Dyer Baronetcy, of Tottenham in the County of Middlesex, was created in the Baronetage of England on 6 July 1678 for William Dyer. He was the husband of Thomazine, only daughter and heiress of Thomas Swinnerton, of Stanway Hall, Essex. The sixth Baronet was a Colonel in the British Army and Groom of the Bedchamber to King George IV when Prince of Wales. The seventh Baronet was a Lieutenant-General in the British Army. The eighth Baronet was an officer in the Royal Navy and served in several naval battles throughout the Peninsular War. The ninth Baronet was a Lieutenant-Colonel in the British Army and served in the Peninsular War, where he was present at Badajoz, Vitoria, San Sebastian, the Pyrenees, Nive, Orthez and Toulouse. The tenth Baronet fought in the Crimean War and was present at Sevastopol. The fifteenth Baronet was Chairman of the Shropshire County Council from 1969 to 1972. The sixteenth Baronet was a mathematician. The presumed seventeenth Baronet has yet to establish his claim and appear on the Official Roll of the Baronetage. He married Pamela Dean.

== Dyer baronets, of Staughton (1627) ==
- Sir Lodowick Dyer, 1st Baronet (c. 1605–1669)

== Dyer, later Swinnerton-Dyer baronets, of Tottenham (1678) ==
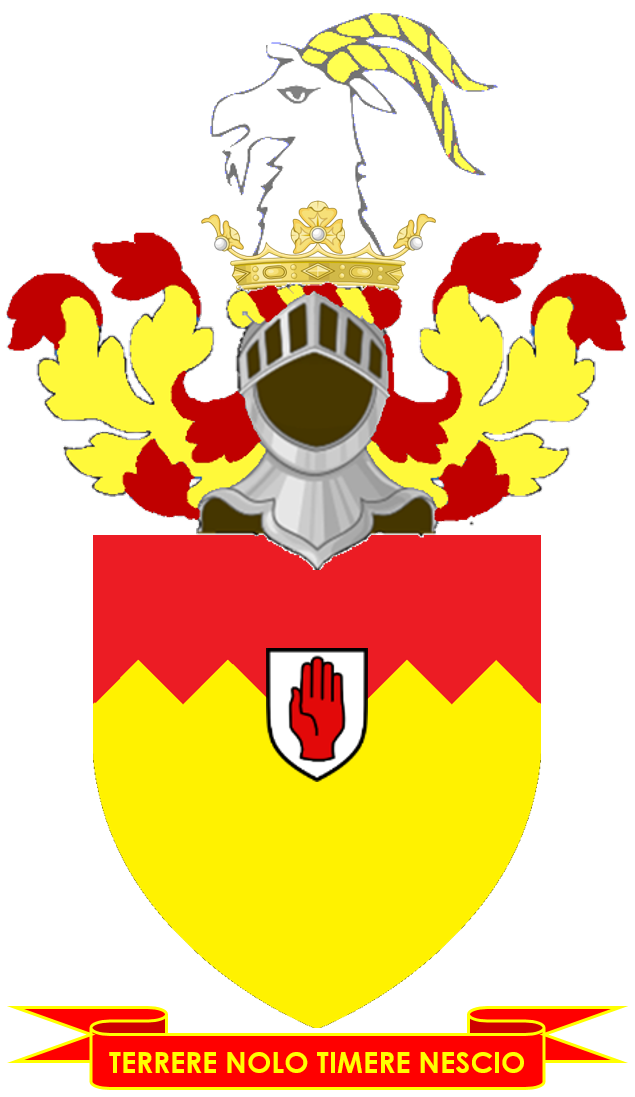
Arms: Or a Chief indented Gules; Crest: Out of a Ducal Coronet Or a Goat's Head Argent armed Gold; Motto: Terrere Nolo, Timere Nescio (Unwilling to frighten, unacquainted with fear)

- Sir William Dyer, 1st Baronet (died 1681)
- Sir John Swinnerton Dyer, 2nd Baronet (c. 1656–1701)
- Sir Swinnerton Dyer, 3rd Baronet (1688–1736)
- Sir John Swinnerton Dyer, 4th Baronet (c. 1692–1754)
- Sir Thomas Dyer, 5th Baronet (1694–1780)
- Sir John Swinnerton Dyer, 6th Baronet (1738–1801)
- Sir Thomas Richard Swinnerton Dyer, 7th Baronet (c. 1770–1838)
- Sir Thomas Swinnerton Dyer, 8th Baronet (1770–1854)
- Sir Thomas Dyer, 9th Baronet (1799–1878)
- Sir Swinnerton Halliday Dyer, 10th Baronet (1833–1882)
- Sir Thomas Swinnerton Dyer, 11th Baronet (1859–1907)
- Sir John Swinnerton Dyer, 12th Baronet (1891–1917)
- Sir John Lodovick Swinnerton Dyer, 13th Baronet (1914–1940)
- Sir Leonard Whitworth Swinnerton Dyer, 14th Baronet (1875–1947)
- Sir Leonard Schroeder Swinnerton Dyer, 15th Baronet (1898–1975)
- Sir (Henry) Peter Francis Swinnerton-Dyer, 16th Baronet (1927–2018)
- David Dyer-Bennet (born 1954), presumed 17th Baronet. As of 2026, the title is marked dormant on the Official Roll.
