= Ovington House =

House in Hampshire, England

Coordinates: 51.0798°N 1.2016°W

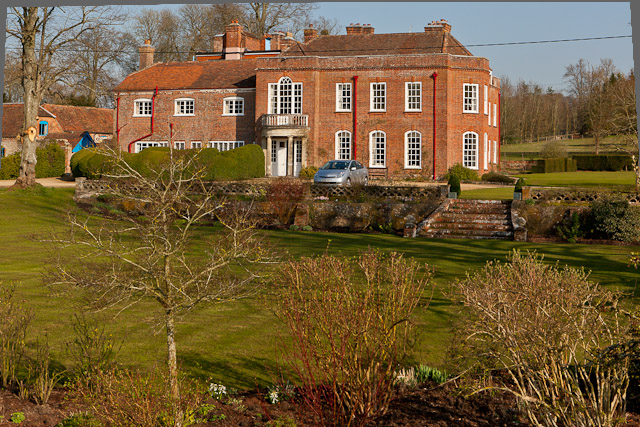
Ovington House, Hampshire, in 2011

Ovington House is a late 18th century house in Ovington, Hampshire.

== History ==
The house was built for James Standerwick. It was inherited by his daughter Elizabeth Standerwick, who married, Sir Thomas Richard Swinnerton Dyer, 7th Baronet (1768–1838). When he died, she remarried in 1839, to Baron Friedrich von Zandt of Würzburg. There were no heirs.

In 1910, the property was acquired by Harvey Hoare of Hoare's Bank.

In 1975, the estate was broken up and sold at auction.

The North Lodge is listed Grade II.

== Legacy ==
London's Ovington Square is named after the estate.
