= Franz Konrad von Stadion und Thannhausen =

Franz Konrad von Stadion und Thannhausen (1679–1757) was the Prince-Bishop of Bamberg from 1753 to 1757. He is unrelated to the von Thannhausen family.

== Biography ==
Franz Konrad von Stadion und Thannhausen was born in Arnstein on 29 August 1679. He became a canon of Bamberg Cathedral in 1695. He was sent to Rome and Angers to study. In 1709, the Archbishop of Mainz named him ambassador to the court of Saxony. He became a member of the cathedral chapter of Würzburg Cathedral in 1719. He was ordained as a priest on 2 February 1724. He became provost of Würzburg Cathedral in 1729.

On 23 July 1753 he was appointed Prince-Bishop of Bamberg, with Pope Benedict XIV confirming the appointment on 26 September 1753. He was consecrated as a bishop by Heinrich Joseph von Nitschke, auxiliary bishop of Bamberg on 4 November 1753.

He died on 6 March 1757 and is buried in Bamberg Cathedral.

Catholic Church titles
Preceded by Johann Philipp Anton von Franckenstein	Prince-Bishop of Bamberg; 1753–1757	Succeeded by Adam Friedrich von Seinsheim
