= Grillion's =

Grillion's was a London dining club founded in 1812. It was founded by the British diplomat Stratford Canning as a meeting place free from the violence of political controversy. The club had no premises but met at Grillion's Hotel on Albemarle Street, from which it took its name. Later it would meet at the Hotel Cecil. The club met weekly during parliamentary session.

The first fifty years of the Grillion's Club is recorded in the book Grillion's Club: From Its Origin In 1812 To Its Fiftieth Anniversary, written quoting many of the club's records by Sir Philip Grey Egerton. The book was privately printed at the Chiswick Press in 1880.

In the 19th and early 20th centuries, many leading statesmen belonged to the club, including prime ministers Gladstone, Salisbury, Balfour, Asquith, and Baldwin.
