= Street names of Mayfair =

This is a list of the etymology of street names in the London district of Mayfair, in the City of Westminster. It utilises the generally accepted boundaries of Mayfair viz. Marble Arch/Cumberland Gate and Oxford Street to the north, Regent Street to the east, Piccadilly to the south and Park Lane to the west.

- Achilles Way – after the nearby Wellington as Achilles statue in Hyde Park
- Adam's Row – believed to be after John Adams, local land agent in the 18th century
- Air Street – believed to be a corruption of ‘Ayres’, after Thomas Ayre, a local brewer and resident in the 17th century
- Albany and Albany Courtyard – after Prince Frederick, Duke of York and Albany, who in 1791 purchased Melbourne House which stood on this site
- Albemarle Street – after the Christopher Monck, 2nd Duke of Albemarle, owner of Clarendon House which stood on this site in the late 17th century
- Aldford Street – after Aldford, a property on the Grosvenor family's Cheshire estates; it was formerly known as Chapel Street before 1886, as it led to the Grosvenor Chapel
- Archibald Mews – unknown; it was formerly John Court, after local landowner John, Lord Berkeley
- Audley Square, North Audley Street and South Audley Street – after Mary Davies, heiress to Hugh Audley, who married Sir Thomas Grosvenor, thereby letting the local land fall into the Grosvenors' ownership
- Avery Row – after Henry Avery, 18th century bricklayer who built this street over the Tyburn Brook, or possibly after Ebury, the ancient manor here
- Balderton Street – after local landowners the Grosvenors, who also owned land in Balderton, Cheshire; formerly George Street
- Balfour Mews and Balfour Place – after Eustace Balfour, surveyor for the Grosvenor estate 1890 – 1910
- Barlow Place – after either Thomas Barlow, builder and surveyor for the Grosvenor estate in the early 18th century or Arthur Balfour, politician and later Prime Minister in the early 20th century
- Berkeley Square and Berkeley Street – Berkeley House formerly stood here, home of John Berkeley, 3rd Baron Berkeley of Stratton in the late 17th century
- Binney Street – after Reverend Thomas Binney, local 19th century minister; formerly called Bird Street
- Blenheim Street – after Blenheim Palace, owned by John Churchill, 1st Duke of Marlborough, 17th – 18th century general
- Blackburne's Mews – after William Blackburne, local resident in the early 18th century
- Bloomfield Place – John Newson, who built the adjacent Bloomfield Flats, named them for his wife's maiden name
- Bolton Street – after Charles Powlett, Duke of Bolton, who owned this land when the street was built in 1699
- Bourdon Place and Bourdon Street – after the former Bourdon House, home of the Bourdon/Burden family in the early 18th century
- Boyle Street – after Richard Boyle, 3rd Earl of Burlington, local landowner in the 18th century
- Brick Street – this area was formerly a set of fields used for digging brick-earth
- Broadbent Street – after William Broadbent, physician to the royal family in the Victorian and Edwardian period, who lived nearby
- Brook Gate, Brook Street, Brook's Mews and Upper Brook Street – Brook Street marks the path of the former Tyburn Brook
- Brown Hart Gardens – this was formerly two streets prior to 1936 – Brown Street, after 18th century local bricklayer John Brown, and Hart Street, probably after a local inn or resident
- Bruton Lane, Bruton Place and Bruton Street – after Bruton, Somerset, where John Berkeley, 3rd Baron Berkeley of Stratton owned land
- Burlington Arcade, Burlington Gardens, New Burlington Mews, New Burlington Place, New Burlington Street and Old Burlington Street – after the local Burlington estate, property of the earls of Burlington
- Carlos Place – after Carlos I of Portugal; it was formerly Charles Street but was renamed in 1886 to avoid confusion with other streets of this name
- Carpenter Street
- Carrington Street – after 18th century local landowner Nathan Carrington
- Charles Street – after a Charles in the family of John Berkeley, 3rd Baron Berkeley of Stratton
- Chesterfield Gardens, Chesterfield Hill and Chesterfield Street – after Philip Stanhope, 4th Earl of Chesterfield, who owned a mansion nearby in the 18th century
- Clarges Mews and Clarges Street – after William (or Thomas) Clarges, local landowner in the 17th century
- Clifford Street – after Richard Boyle, 3rd Earl of Burlington, also Baron Clifford, after his ancestor Elizabeth Clifford
- Coach and Horses Yard – after the Burlington Arms pub here, formerly the Coach and Horses
- Conduit Street – after a former water conduit here leading to the city and owned by the Corporation of London from the 15th century
- Cork Street and Cork Street Mews – after Richard Boyle, 3rd Earl of Burlington, also 4th Earl of Cork
- Culross Street – thought to be after Culross in Fife; prior to 1899 it was Northrop Street, after a Welsh property owned by the Grosvenor family
- Cumberland Gate – after Prince William, Duke of Cumberland, brother of George III; it was formerly Tyburn Gate, after the Tyburn Brook
- Curzon Gate, Curzon Square and Curzon Street – after Nathaniel Curzon (and his family), local landowner in the 18th century
- Davies Mews and Davies Street – after Mary Davies, heiress to Hugh Audley, who married Sir Thomas Grosvenor, thereby letting the local land fall into the Grosvenors' ownership
- Deanery Mews and Deanery Street – this land was owned by Westminster Abbey in the 18th century; it was formerly known as Dean and Chapter Street
- Derby Street – after Derbyshire, home county of local landowners the Curzon family
- Dering Street and Dering Yard – unknown
- Down Street and Down Street Mews – after John Downes, local bricklayer in the 18th century
- Dover Street and Dover Yard – after Henry Jermyn, 1st Baron Dover, local leaseholder in the late 17th century
- Duke Street and Duke Yard – it is unknown precisely which duke, if any, this street commemorates
- Dunraven Street – after Windham Thomas Wyndham-Quin, 4th Earl of Dunraven and Mount-Earl, politician and soldier who lived near here
- Farm Street – this street was formerly part of Hay Hill farm
- Fitzmaurice Place – after John FitzMaurice, father of William Petty, 1st Marquess of Lansdowne who lived near here in the 18th century
- George Yard – probably after John George, local 18th century glazier and builder
- Gilbert Street – unknown; formerly James Street
- Globe Yard
- Grafton Street – after the Dukes of Grafton, who owned a town house near here in the 18th century
- Grantham Place – after John (or Thomas) Grantham, local builder in the 18th century
- Green Street – after John Green, local builder of the 18th century
- Grosvenor Gate, Grosvenor Hill, Grosvenor Square, Grosvenor Street and Upper Grosvenor Street – after the Grosvenors, former local landowners
- Half Moon Street – after a former inn near here of this name
- Hamilton Mews and Hamilton Place – built on land belonging to Mr Hamilton, ranger of Hyde Park during the reign King Charles II
- Hanover Square and Hanover Street – after the House of Hanover, reigning dynasty when the square and street were built in 1713
- Harewood Place – after Ahrwood House, residence of the Earls of Harewood in the 19th century
- Haunch of Venison Yard – after a former 18th century inn near here
- Hay Hill, Hay's Mews and Hill Street – after the Hay Hill farm which formerly stood here; the farm was originally ‘Aye farm’, after the nearby Aye Brook
- Heddon Street – after William Pulteney (later also Baron Heddon), local 18th century landowner
- Hertford Street – after a former local inn named after the Seymours, Marquesses of Hertford
- Jervis Court
- Jones Street – after William Jones, yeoman, who leased a large plot here in 1723
- Lancashire Court
- Lansdowne Row – former site of Lansdowne House, home of William Petty, 1st Marquess of Lansdowne in the 18th century
- Lees Place – after either Robert Lee (or Lees), owner of the Two Chairman pub which formerly stood here or one Thomas Barrett of Lee, Kent, 19th century builder
- Lumley Street – after Sibell Lumley, wife of Victor, Earl Grosvenor, local landowner
- Lynsey Way
- Maddox Street – after the local Maddox estate, purchased by William Maddox in the 1620s
- Marble Arch – after the Marble Arch erected here in 1851
- Market Mews – after the former Shepherd Market near here
- Mason's Arms Mews – after the nearby Mason's Arms pub
- Mayfair Place – after the May Fair that was formerly held here in the 17th – 18th centuries
- Mill Street – after a windmill that formerly stood here next to the Tyburn brook
- Mount Row, Mount Street and Mount Street Mews – built over the former Mount Field, from the former Oliver's Mount fortification built here by Oliver Cromwell during the English Civil War
- New Bond Street, Old Bond Street and Upper Bond Street – after Thomas Bond, member of the consortium that developed the local area in the late 17th century; ‘New’ comes from the extension of the then ‘Bond Street’ northwards in the early 18th century
- North Row – after its location as the northernmost street on the Grosvenor estate
- Oxford Circus and Oxford Street – after Edward Harley, 2nd Earl of Oxford and Earl Mortimer who owned much of the local estate; prior to this it was known as Tyburn Road, as it led to the Tyburn gibbet at what is now Marble Arch. Circus is a British term for a road junction; it was formerly Regent Circus, after Regent Street
- Park Lane, Old Park Lane and Park Street – after the nearby Hyde Park; Park Lane was formerly Tyburn Lane, after the Tyburn gibbet and stream, and Park Street was formerly Hyde Park Street
- Piccadilly, Piccadilly Circus and Piccadilly Place – after Piccadilly Hall, home of local tailor Robert Baker in the 17th century, believed to be named after the pickadils (collars/hem trimmings) which made his fortune. Circus is a British term for a road junction; it was laid out by John Nash in 1819
- Pitt's Head Mews – after a former pub on this site called the Pitt's Head, thought to be named after William Pitt the Elder
- Pollen Street – after the Pollen family, who inherited the estate from the Maddox family
- Princes Street – named in a generic sense in honour of the then reigning House of Hanover
- Providence Court – unknown
- Queen Street – when it was built in 1735 there was no reigning queen, so to which queen it refers, if any, is unknown
- Red Lion Yard
- Red Place – coined in Victorian times after the colour of the local buildings
- Reeves Mews – after Spelsant Reeves, local leaseholder in the 18th century
- Regent Street – made in the 1810s by John Nash and named after the Prince Regent, later George IV
- Rex Place – formerly King's Mews, it was renamed after the Latin term for ‘king’
- Royal Arcade – after Queen Victoria, who visited this arcade
- Sackville Street – after Captain Edward Sackville, tenant of a house on the west side of the street in 1675; it was formerly known as Stone Conduit Close
- Saddle Yard
- St Anselm's Place – former site of St Anselm's church, demolished 1938
- St George Street – originally George Street, after George I, reigning monarch when the street was built; the ‘St’ was later added to link it to the nearby St George's church
- Savile Row – after Dorothy Savile, Countess of Burlington and Countess of Cork, wife of Richard Boyle, 3rd Earl of Burlington, local landowner
- Sedley Place – named after Angelo Sedley, local 19th century furniture salesman
- Shepherd Close, Shepherd Market, Shepherd Place and Shepherd Street – after Edward Shepherd, local builder in the 18th century; Shepherd Place was built by his brother John Shepherd
- South Molton Lane and South Molton Street – unknown; South Molton Lane was formerly Poverty Lane
- South Street – after its location as the southernmost street on the Grosvenor estate
- Stafford Street – after Margaret Stafford, local leaseholder in the late 17th century
- Stanhope Gate and Stanhope Row – after Philip Stanhope, 4th Earl of Chesterfield, who owned a mansion nearby in the 18th century
- Stratton Street – after John Berkeley, 3rd Baron Berkeley of Stratton, local resident in the late 17th century
- Swallow Passage, Swallow Place and Swallow Street – after a field on this site owned by Thomas Swallow in the 1530s
- Tentereden Street – unknown
- Three Kings Yard – after a nearby inn, demolished 1879
- Tilney Street – after either John Tilney (or Tylney), who was granted this land in the 18th century or Ann Tilney, 18th century property owner; it was formerly Tripe Yard, after the butchery trade here
- Trebeck Street – after Reverend Trebeck, former rector of St George's on Hanover Square in the 18th century
- Tyburn Way – formerly the site of the Tyburn gallows, itself named after a deserted hamlet called Tiburne in the Domesday Book, meaning ‘boundary stream’
- Union Yard
- Vigo Street – after either the British victory at the Battle of Vigo Bay in 1702 or the capture of a Spanish vessel of this name in 1719
- Vine Street – after The Vine, an 18th-century public house, which in turn may have been named after a vineyard that existed at this location in Roman times
- Waverton Street – after Waverton, Cheshire, where local landowners the Grosvenors also held land
- Weighhouse Street – after the King's Weigh House Chapel, which moved here in 1891; before this it was known as Robert Street, after Robert Grosvenor, 1st Marquess of Westminster, and before that as Chandler Street after the local chandler trade
- White Horse Street – after a former inn of this name at this site, named for the Royal emblem of the House of Hanover
- Wood's Mews – after Richard Wood, who built this street in 1731
- Woodstock Street – after either Woodstock, Oxfordshire, location of to Blenheim Palace, home of John Churchill, 1st Duke of Marlborough, 17th – 18th century general or Thomas Woodstock, 18th century builder
- Yarmouth Place – after Francis Charles Seymour-Conway, 3rd Marquess of Hertford, Earl of Yarmouth who lived near here in the 19th century
