= Kingsland Road =

Road in the London Borough of Hackney

Coordinates: 51°32′18″N 0°04′36″W

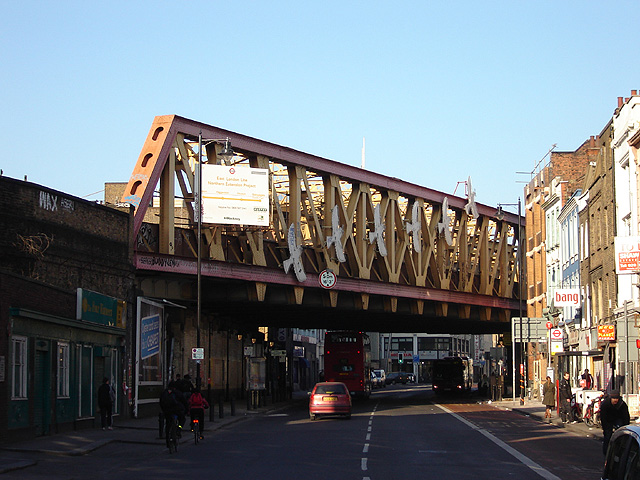
Kingsland Road looking north from the point where it becomes Shoreditch High Street. (January 2006).

Kingsland Road is the name given to an East London stretch of the A10 road within the London Borough of Hackney in England. The A10 was originally a Roman Road better known as Ermine Street or sometimes the Old North Road.

The name Kingsland Road is used from the junction with Old Street and Hackney Road (the section of the A10 south of this is Shoreditch High Street) north to the junction with Balls Pond Road and Dalston Lane, where it changes its name to Kingsland High Street. Kingsland Road means the road to Kingsland, an old settlement that has been absorbed by modern Dalston.

The quality and variety of architectural styles present along the road has led to the Kingsland Road corridor being designated a conservation area.

The Museum of the Home formerly known as Geffrye Museum is located on Kingsland Road. There are both wealthy and parts with almshouses there.

The band Kingsland Road named themselves "Kingsland" after the road, before later expanding their name.
