= Schloss Seehof =

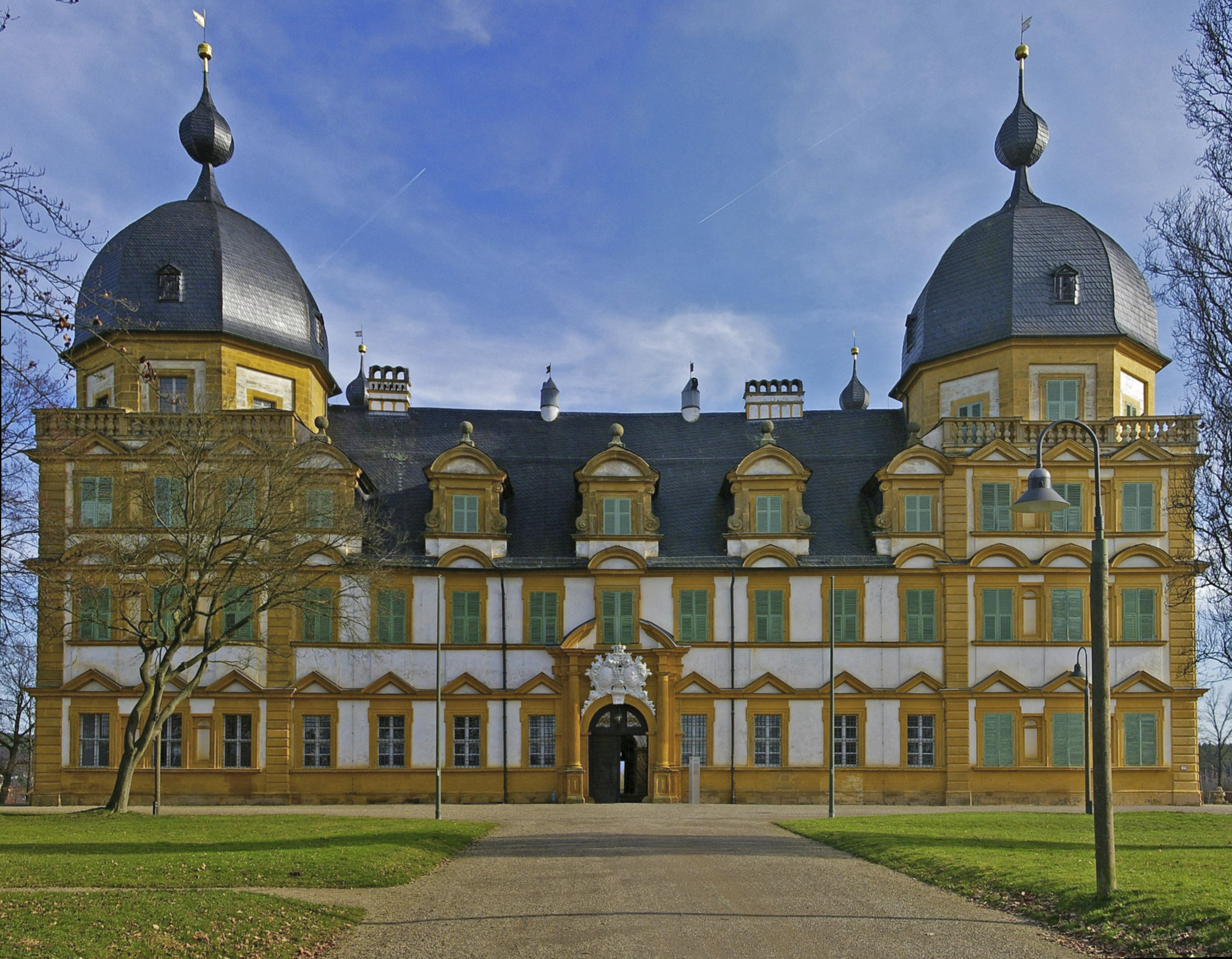
- Schloss Seehof in 2007

- Location within Bavaria Location within Germany
- Alternative names: Marquardsburg

General information
- Type: Schloss
- Architectural style: Early Baroque
- Location: Memmelsdorf, Germany
- Coordinates: 49°55′37″N 10°56′52″E
- Owner: Bavarian Administration of State-Owned Palaces, Gardens and Lakes

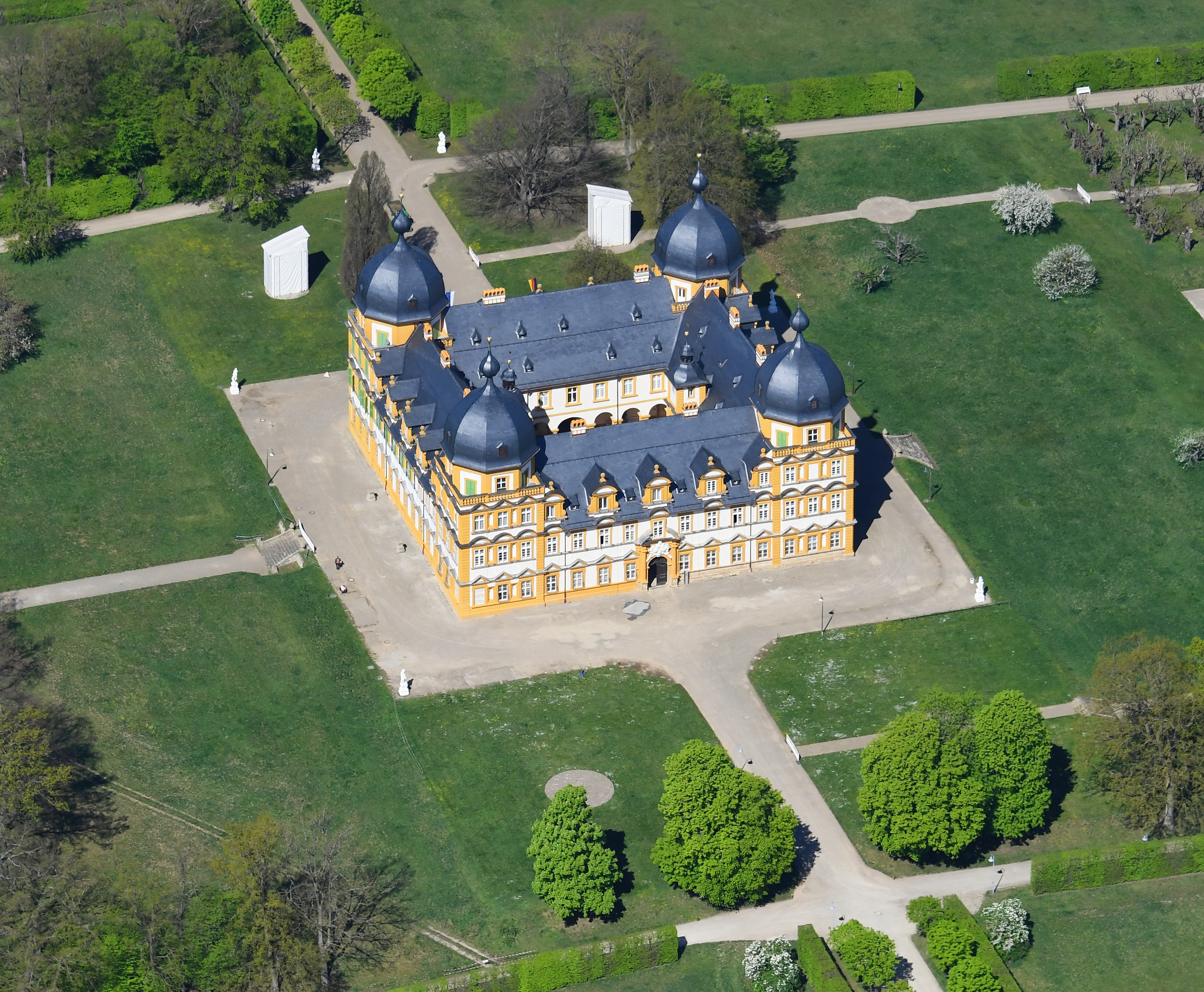
Aerial view

Schloss Seehof is a Schloss (palace) in Memmelsdorf, Bamberg, Germany. It was built from 1684 to 1695 as a summer residence and hunting lodge for Marquard Sebastian Schenk von Stauffenberg, Prince-bishop of Bamberg.

== Location ==
Schloss Seehof is located outside of Memmelsdorf in the district of Bamberg, around 5 kilometers northeast of the town of Bamberg in the Upper Franconia region of Bavaria, Germany.

== History ==
Marquard Sebastian Schenk von Stauffenberg, Prince-bishop of Bamberg, enjoyed the rural area around Memmelsdorf. He thus asked Antonio Petrini to replace a local estate from the late 15th century with an early Baroque palace. This was built between 1684 and 1695.

Later redesigns included the White Hall in the west wing, created during the reign of Johann Philipp Anton von Franckenstein in the 1750s.

== Description ==
The palace is located in a large park and stands on a square plan, much like Schloss Johannisburg at Aschaffenburg. The four corner pavilions are topped by squat octagonal towers with prominent slate roof hoods featuring pierced ball ornaments. The facades are heavily segmented by large windows (with triangular gables on the ground floor and arches on the upper floor). Each row of windows is supported by a cornice. The inner court features two small clock towers and an arcade that surrounds it on the ground floor on all four sides.

The interior mostly dates from the 1730s. Balthasar Neumann and J.J.M. Küchel were involved in the designs. The palace chapel on the ground floor contains a Rococo altar that was made out of stucco by Antonio Bossi based on a drawing by Küchel. The altar painting is Die Heiligen drei Könige (the Three Magi) by Johann Rottenhammer (c. 1600). The centre part of the upper floor is occupied by a Baroque flight of rooms with the Rokokosaal in the middle. Its walls were covered by gypsum "marble" and reliefs painted by F.A. Decourt. The ceiling has a painting by Giuseppe Appiani, showing the goddess of the dawn (1752).

The park is today quite different in appearance than originally, when it was laid out during the reign of Lothar Franz von Schönborn in the early 18th century, since the ponds, cascades and fountains were all drained in 1803-6, after the water pipe from the Stammberg had been cut. Most of the around 400 figures created by the sculptors Ferdinand Tietz, Gollwitzer and Trautmann in the 1760s were destroyed or sold following secularization. Some of these groups are today scattered around the Bamberg area or were taken to the Germanisches Nationalmuseum at Nuremberg. Today, a few have been returned and are on display in the western Orangerie. In the 1960s and 1970s vases and benches were sold off to private buyers. After 1995, the park was restored, including the cascade. Access to the park is by five ornamental wrought-iron gates, flanked by two guard houses which were built by Küchel. The six pillars are topped by lions and vases created by Peter Benkert. The smaller entry from the village is due to B. Neumann and Küchel. The sweeping Orangeries were used by Adam Friedrich von Seinsheim in the 1770s for staging plays. At the time, the guest rooms in the western wing still had a direct view of the Neue Residenz at Bamberg. The park features hornbeam hedges that are over 300 years old and groves of 250-year old linden trees.

== Today ==
The palace is administered by the Bavarian Administration of State-Owned Palaces, Gardens and Lakes. It is partially open to the public. Most of the building is occupied by the Bayerisches Landesamt für Denkmalpflege. A total of nine representative period rooms are open to the public. The chapel is available for weddings and some of the palace rooms can be rented for private events.

== Gallery ==
Seehof palace - Schloss Seehof

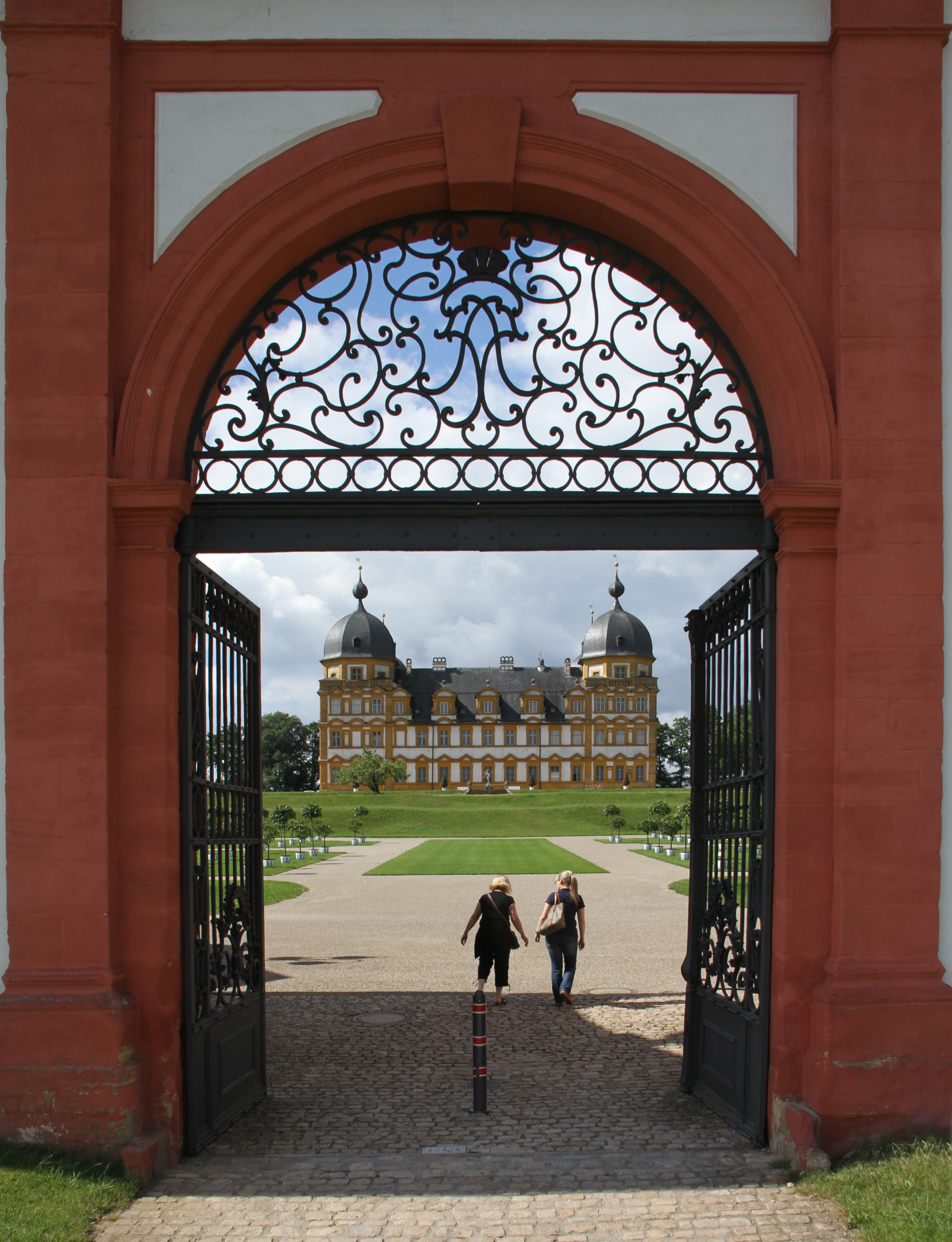

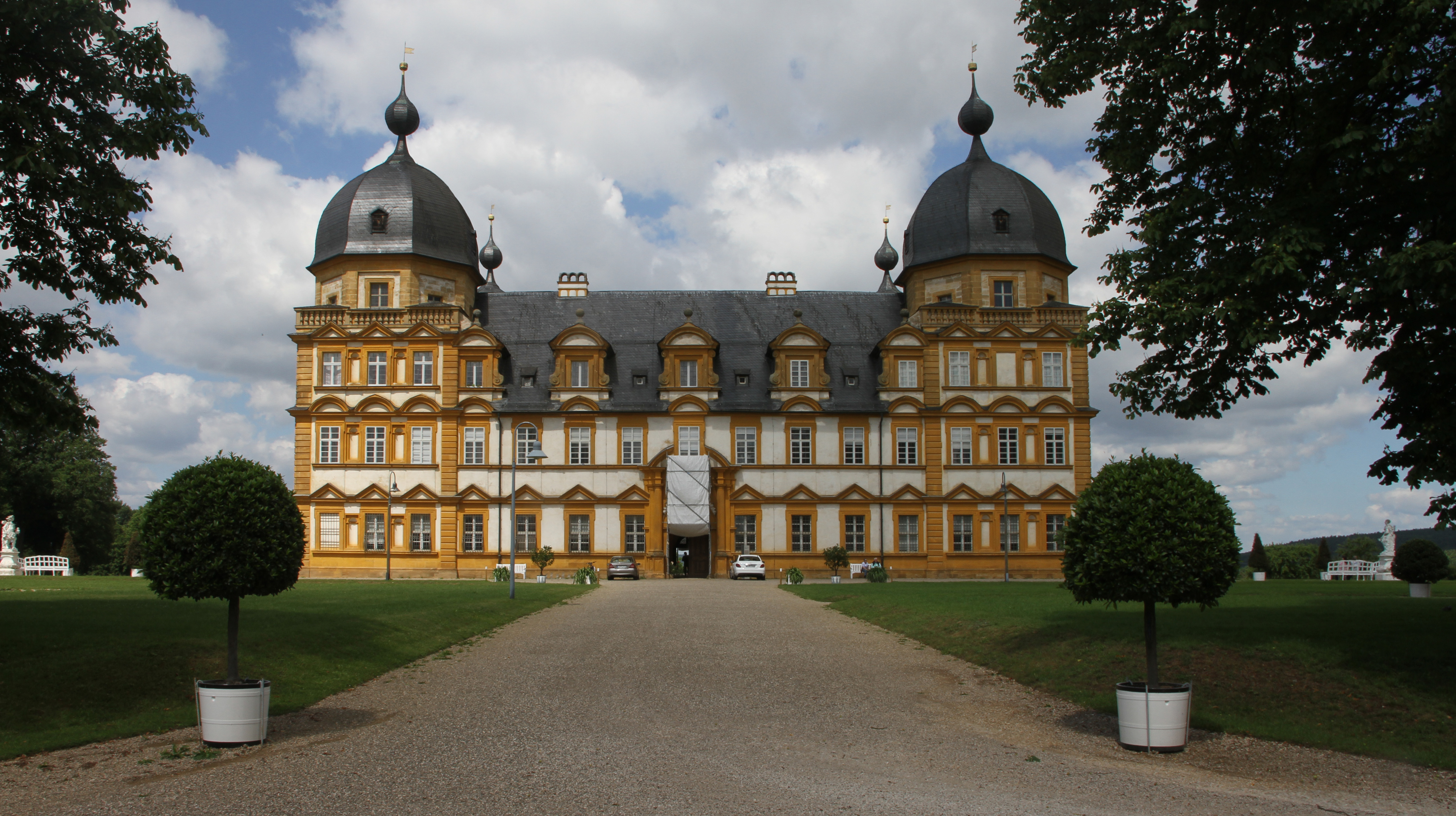

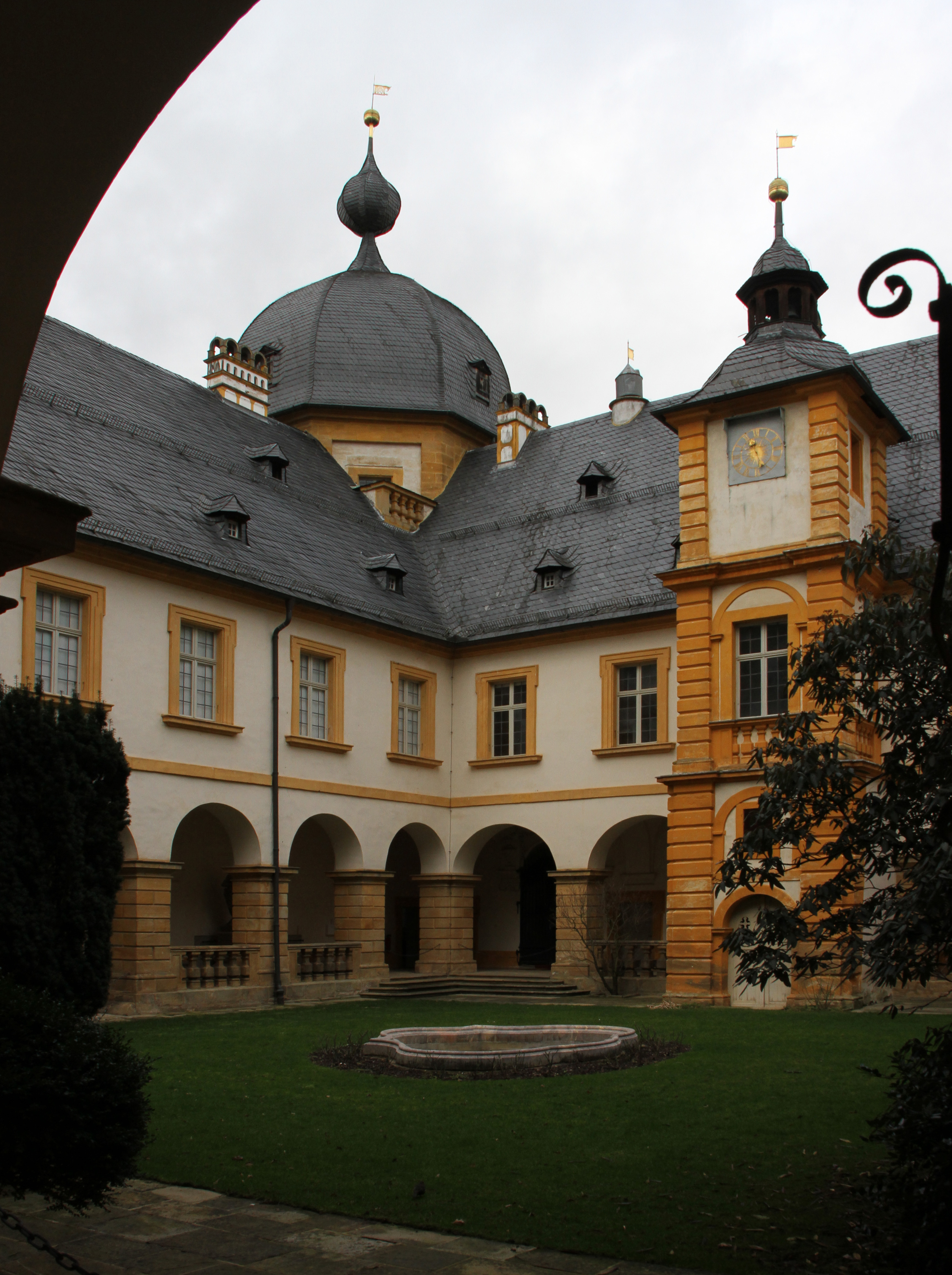

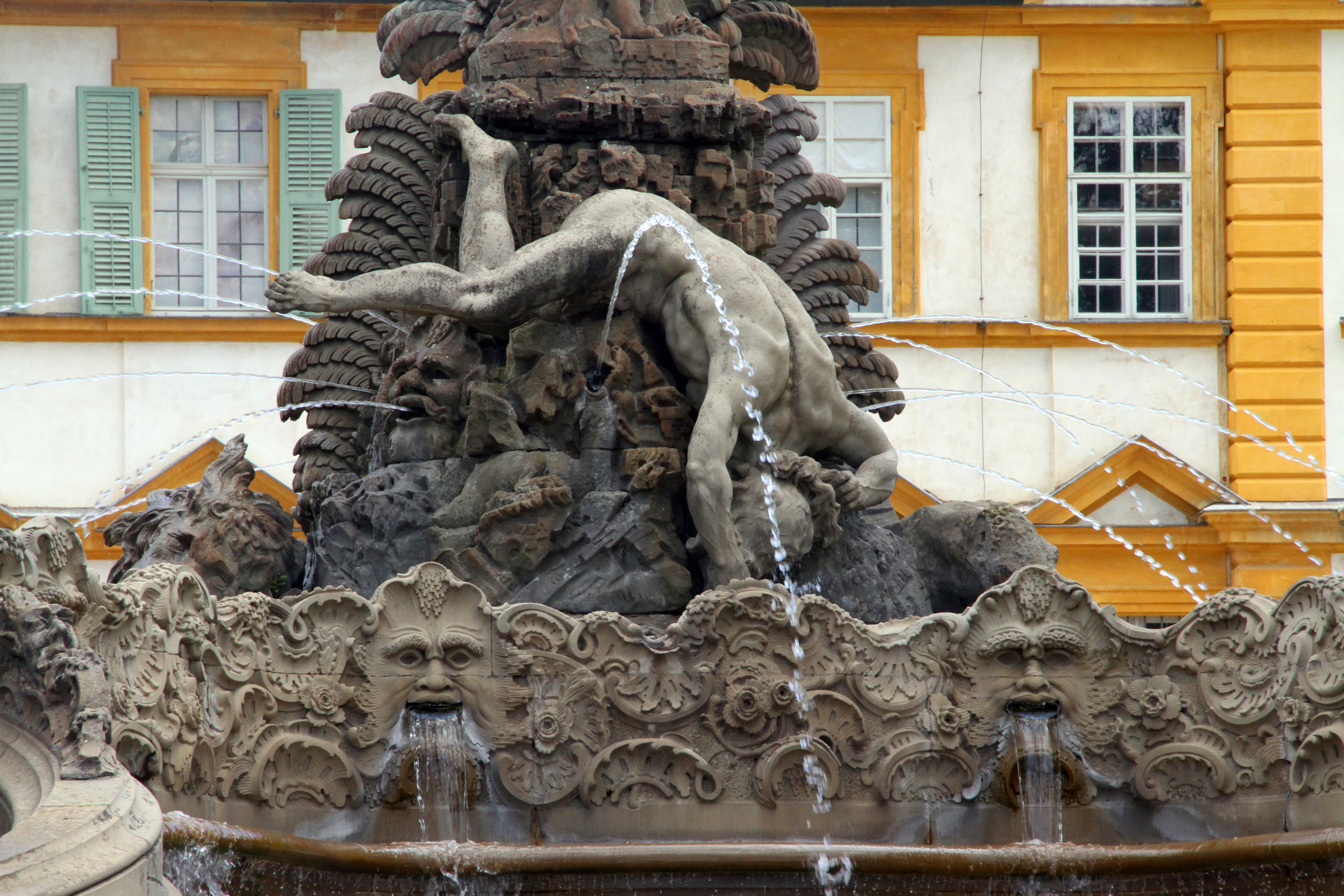

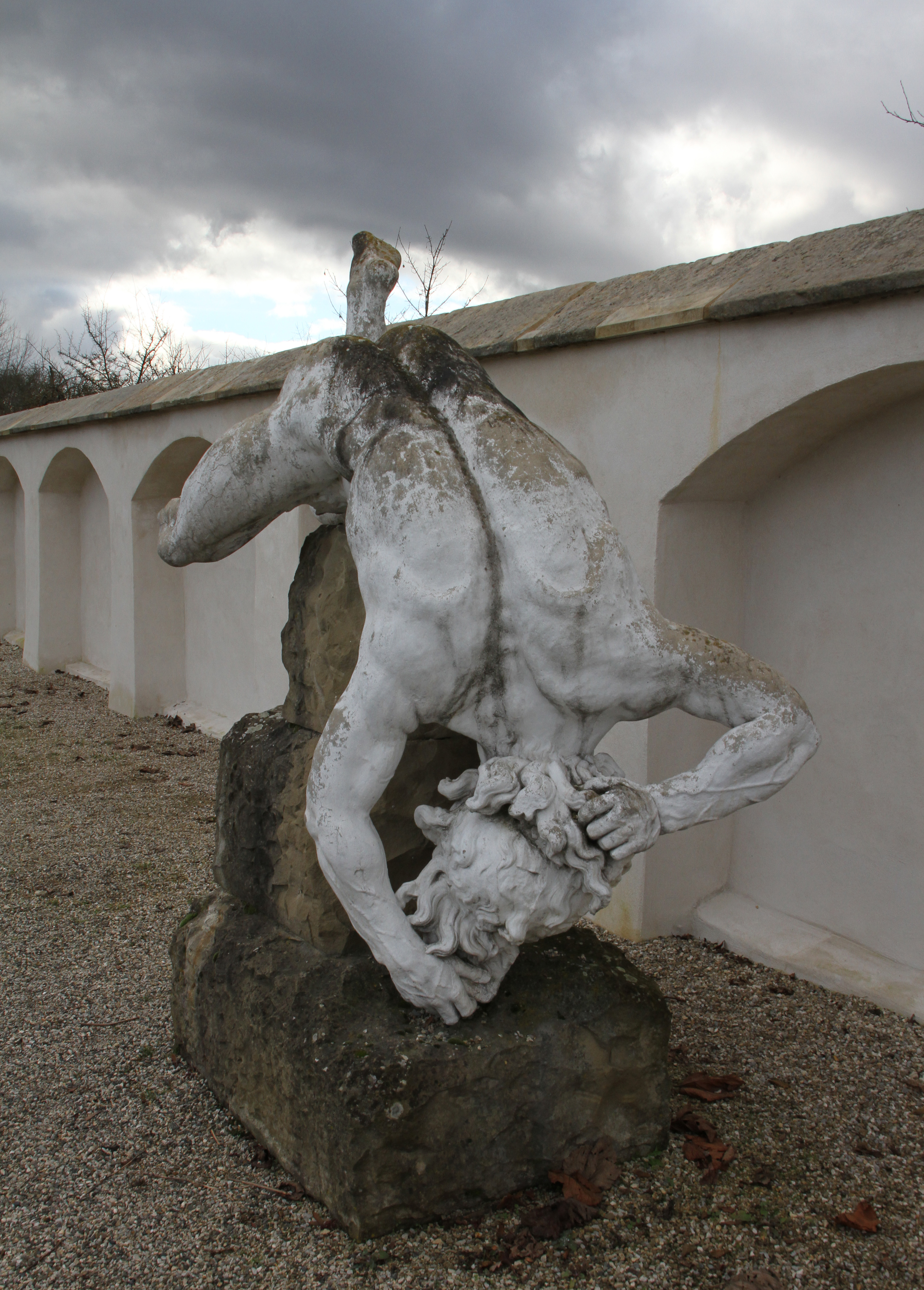

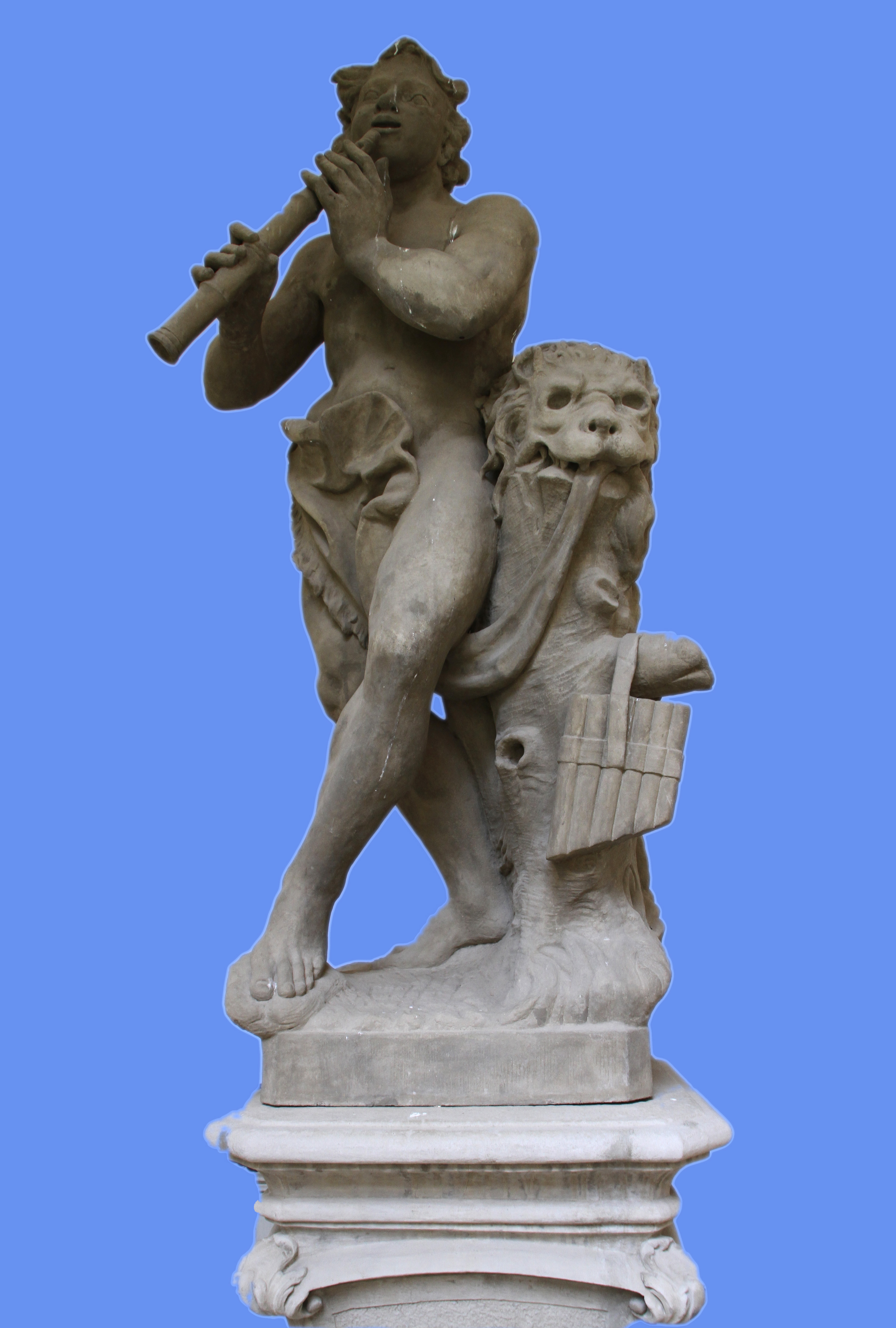

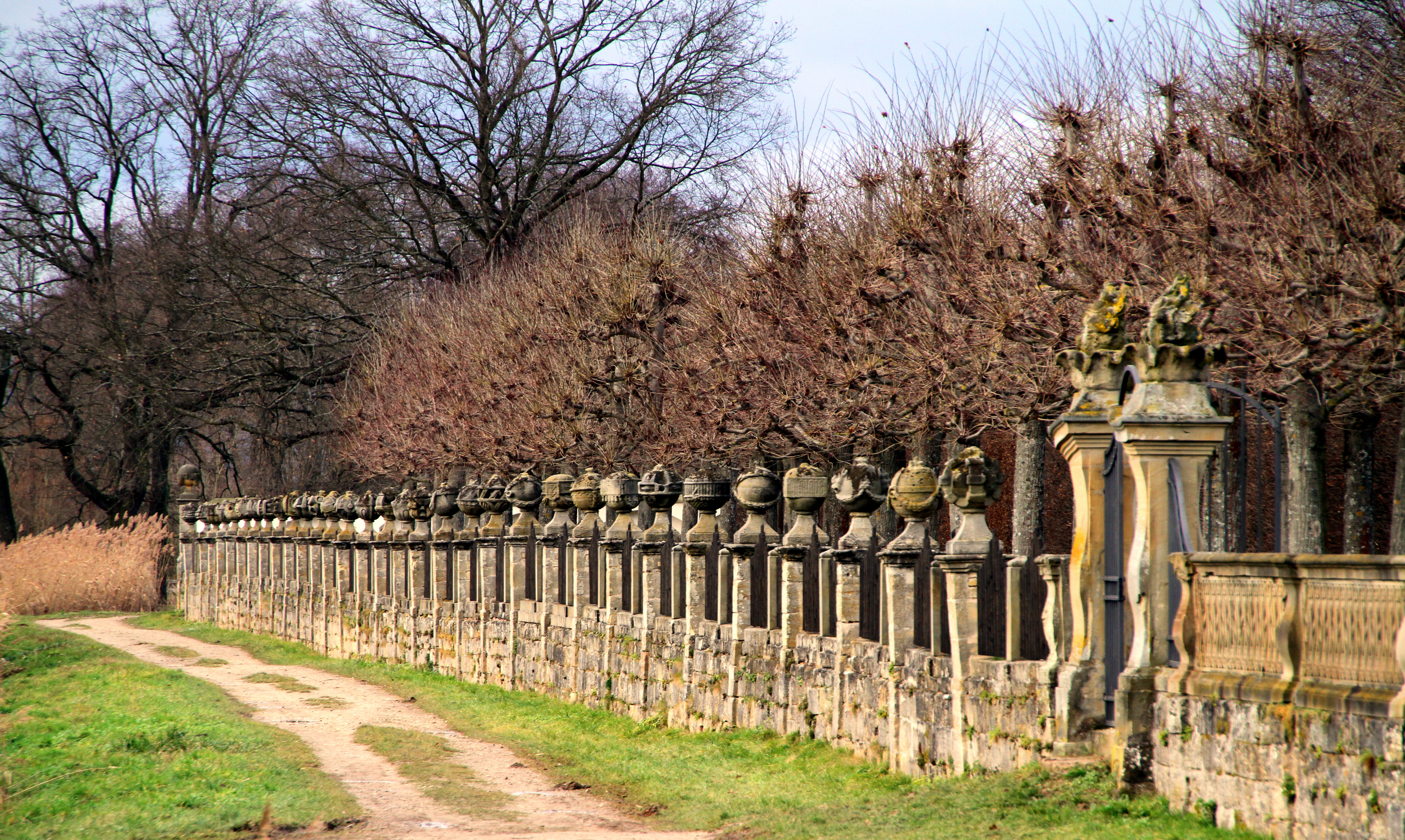

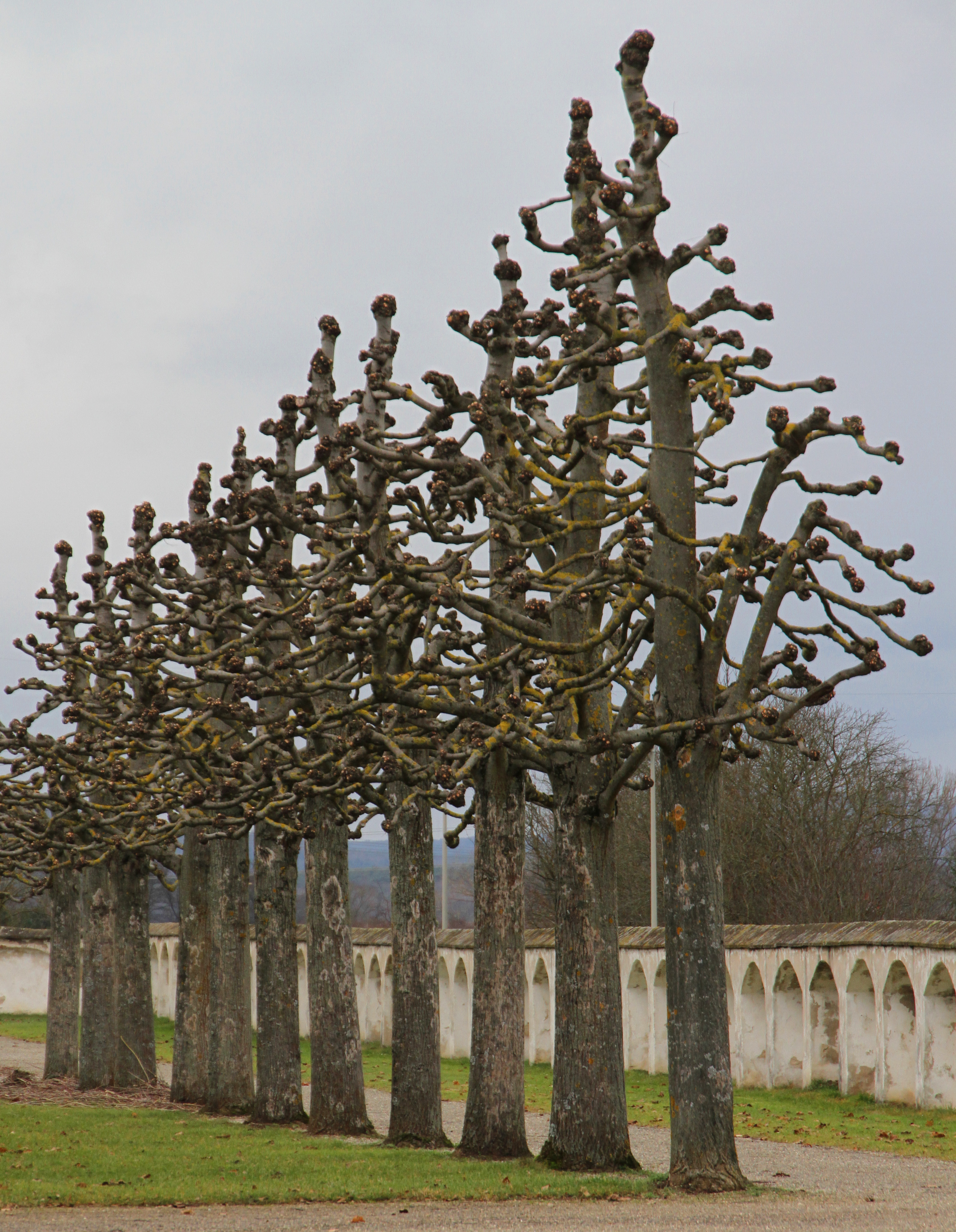

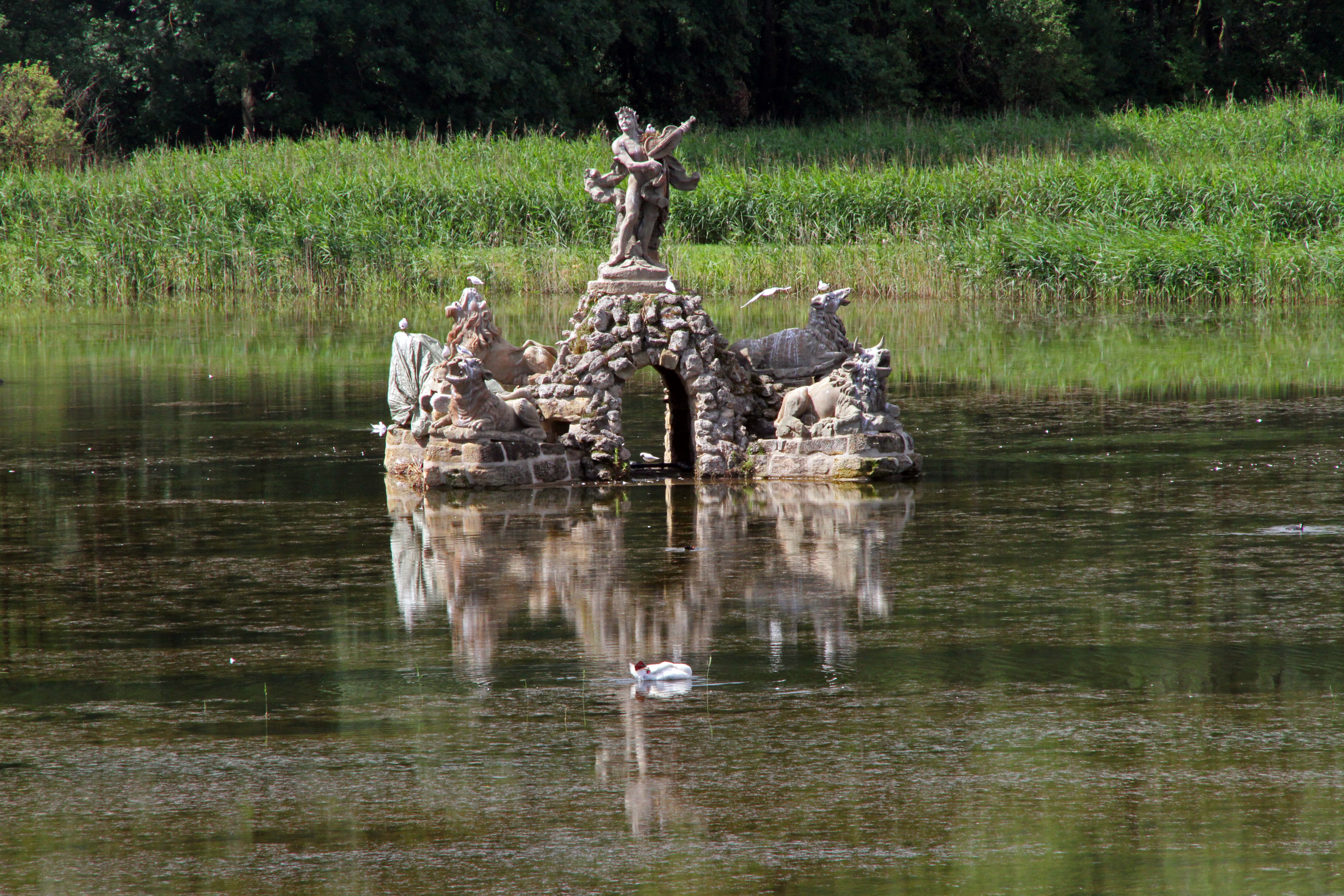

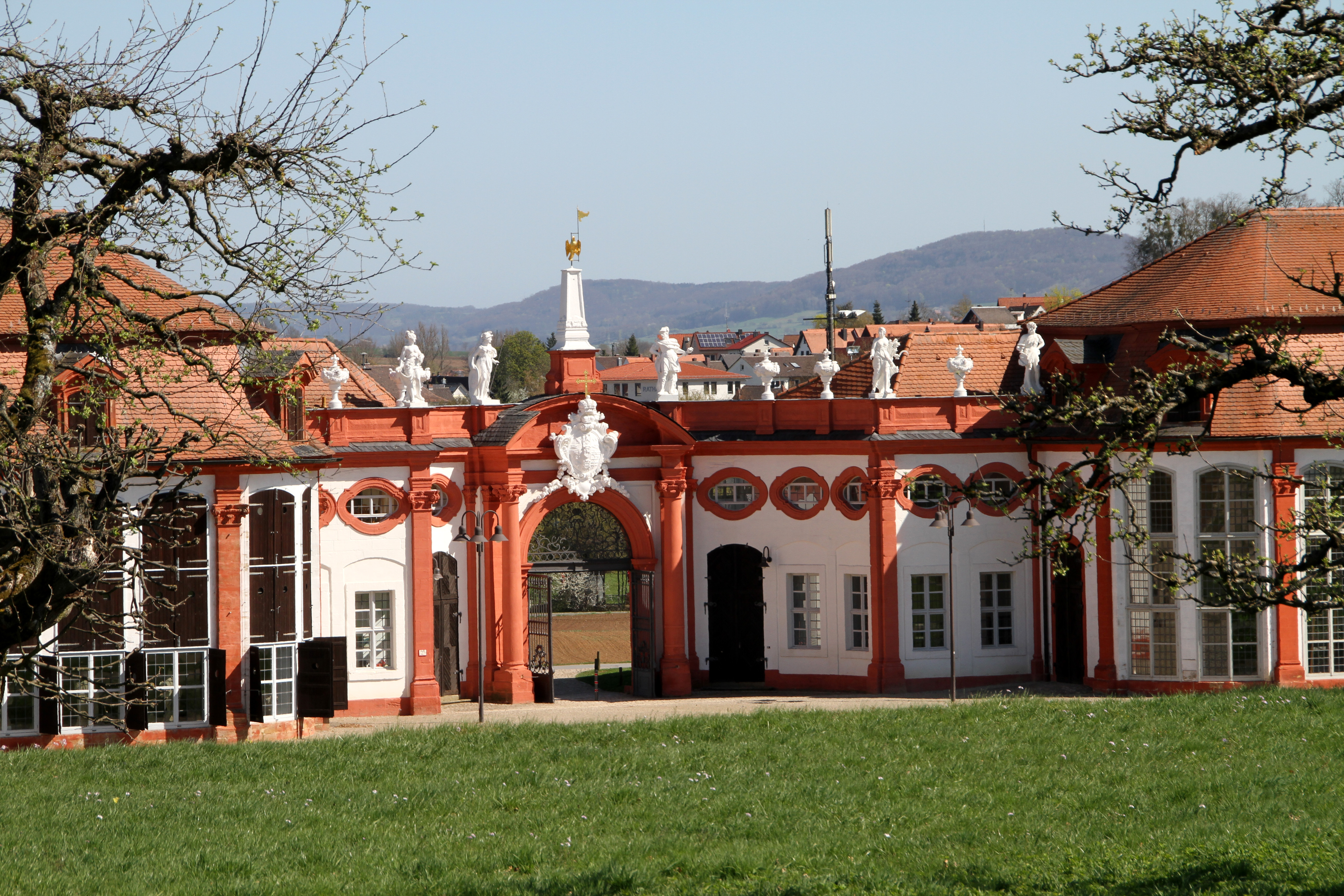
