= Isaac Nordheimer =

American biblical scholar

- Born: 1809; Memmelsdorf, Kingdom of Bavaria
- Died: 3 November 1842 (aged 32–33); New York City, United States
- Relatives: Abraham Nordheimer (brother); Samuel Nordheimer (brother)

Academic background
- Education: Ludwig-Maximilians-Universität München

Academic work
- Discipline: Linguistics, theology
- Sub-discipline: Hebrew and Syriac languages, sacred literature
- Institutions: University of the City of New York
- Notable works: A Critical Grammar of the Hebrew Language
- Influenced: George Bush

Isaac Nordheimer (1809 in Memmelsdorf, Germany – 3 November 1842, in New York City, United States) was a Jewish American Hebrew scholar who also studied Syriac and other Near East languages. He is notable as an early Jewish scholar in the United States, as well as being a linguist who was also educated in the Rabbinic tradition.

== Biography ==
Nordheimer was born in 1809 in Memmelsdorf in what was then the independent Kingdom of Bavaria, which later became a part of modern Germany. He was considered an iluy (prodigy) as a boy and was sent to the yeshiva at Pressburg (Bratislava) in Hungary, which was run by rabbi Moses Schreiber, a leading Orthodox Jewish religious figure. While at the yeshiva, however, Nordheimer contracted tuberculosis for the first time, the disease which would later cause his death. In 1828, Nordheimer left the yeshiva aged eighteen to return home and recuperate. Hebrew scholar Shalom Goldman identifies Nordheimer as the prototype of a maskil, a figure associated with the Haskalah, or "Jewish Enlightenment".

Nordheimer began to pursue a secular education, entering the gymnasium of Würzburg. He was able to progress to the University of Würzburg in 1830, where he stayed until 1832, focusing on study of the philosophy of language. By late 1832, he had moved on to the Ludwig-Maximilians-Universität München, where he studied philology, concentrating on Sanskrit, Greek, Latin, and the Semitic languages. He received his Ph.D. in 1834 and also successfully passed a Jewish theological exam.

While at the Ludwig-Maximilians-Universität München, Nordheimer met two Americans who sought to bring him to the United States. One of them was Thomas Smith Grimké, a temperance and peace advocate who promoted the use of the Bible in schools. Grimké wished to foster better Hebrew education in the United States and promote it as a classical language similar to the status given to Greek or Latin. He planned to meet Nordheimer in New York, but before Nordheimer arrived, Grimké had died. Arriving in New York in the summer of 1835, Nordheimer decided to stay in the city and seek opportunities there rather than his original plan of travelling to Charleston, South Carolina, as had been agreed upon with Grimké. He found opportunities teaching Hebrew in New York and became increasingly more well-known, such that in 1836, he was appointed to be the "Professor of Arabic and other Oriental Languages" at the newly-founded University of the City of New York.

Nordheimer published his first major work around this time, A Critical Grammar of the Hebrew Language, while also teaching at the New Haven Theological Seminary. He attracted the interest of the American Biblical scholar, Edward Robinson, who was promoting the relatively unfamiliar discipline of philology in the United States, something he had studied in Germany. Robinson had Nordheimer take over teaching his Hebrew classes at New York's Union Theological Seminary while Robinson travelled to Palestine to further his research, which would ultimately lead to Robinson's magnum opus, his Biblical Researches in Palestine. Nordheimer became the first Jewish faculty member at the Union Theological Seminary, and the only Jewish faculty member to be appointed until Abraham Joshua Heschel in the 1960s. He was also influential on Moses Stuart and George Bush, two American scholars who had also published books on Hebrew grammar. Stuart was complimentary in his review of Nordheimer's Critical Grammar, and when Bush released the second edition of his Grammar of the Hebrew Language in 1839, it incorporated philological elements, with Bush explicitly mentioning Nordheimer as an influence. It was around this time that he was joined in New York by his brothers, Abraham and Samuel, though they moved on to Canada and became successful music publishers and piano dealers.

Since his first bout of tuberculosis, Nordheimer's health had always been delicate. It began to decline toward the end of his life, even as he pursued a variety of treatments prescribed by physicians, along with recuperative visits to the Saratoga mineral springs. In 1842, he was developing another major work, A Complete Hebrew and Chaldee Concordance to the Old Testament, of which he had released the first volume covering the letters aleph and bet. He taught his final class on 28 October, and died shortly after on 3 November 1842, at the age of thirty-three. He was buried at the Congregation Shearith Israel cemetery on 21st Street in Manhattan. Shortly after his death, a poem named "The Tomb of Nordheimer" was published in the Semi-Weekly Courier and New York Enquirer.

== Literary works ==
Among his contributions to the Biblical Repository, "The Philosophy of Ecclesiastes" (July 1838) was particularly notable. In 1838 he published the first volume of his elaborate Hebrew grammar, and in 1841 the second volume (2d ed., with additions and improvements, 2 vols., New York, 1842). Another work was A Grammatical Analysis of Select Portions of Scripture, or a Chrestomathy (New York, 1838). Nordheimer left several works in manuscript; a Chaldee and Syriac grammar and an Arabic grammar in German; a larger Arabic grammar in English; a Hebrew concordance, incomplete; Ecclesiastes translated and explained, in German; and a mass of philological notes.

== See also ==
- List of Jewish American linguists
