= Abraham Nordheimer =

Canadian musician

- Born: February 24, 1816; Memmelsdorf, Kingdom of Bavaria
- Died: January 18, 1862 (aged 45); Bamberg, Kingdom of Bavaria
- Occupation(s): Musician, merchant, music publisher
- Spouse: Fanny Rosenthal
- Parents: Meier Nordheimer (father); Esther Nathan (mother)
- Relatives: Isaac Nordheimer (brother); Samuel Nordheimer (brother)

Abraham Nordheimer (February 24, 1816 – January 18, 1862) was a German Jewish-Canadian musician, merchant and music publisher who established Canada's first publishing house specializing in music.

The son of Meier Nordheimer, a cattle dealer, and Esther Nathan, he was born in Memmelsdorf and came to New York City in 1839 with his brother Samuel. Nordheimer moved to Kingston in 1842, becoming the first Jew living there and began advertising his services as a music teacher. He also opened a store which sold sheet music and musical instruments. It has been said that Nordheimer gave music lessons to the children of Canadian Governor-General Sir Charles Bagot.

In 1844, he opened a music store in Toronto with his brother Samuel. Besides selling reprints of European music, the brothers also published Canadian compositions. The firm sold instruments manufactured in the United States; it later became involved in the manufacturing of pianos. Branches of the store were opened in Montreal, Hamilton and London. The firm invited famous performers of the day to come to Canada and established a concert hall in Montreal.

Nordheimer played the piano and sang; he also played second violin for the Toronto Philharmonic Society.

In 1849, with Judah George Joseph, he purchased land to establish a Jewish cemetery in Toronto.

Nordheimer married Fanny Rosenthal.

He died in Bamberg at the age of 45 during a visit to Germany.

In 1927, Heintzman & Co. took over the operation of the Nordheimer Piano & Music Company Ltd. factory.

== See also ==
- List of German Canadians
- List of Canadian Jews
- Music in Canada
