= Heintzman =

Heintzman may refer to:

- Theodor August Heintzman (1817-1899), Canadian piano manufacturer.
- Heintzman & Co., the piano company started by the above.
- Andrew Heintzman, Canadian journalist.
