= Heintzelman =

Heintzelman is a surname. Notable people with the surname include:

- Ken Heintzelman (1915–2000), American baseball player
- Samuel P. Heintzelman (1805–1880), United States Army General
- Stuart Heintzelman (1876–1935), American soldier
- Tom Heintzelman (born 1946), American baseball player

== See also ==
- Heintzelman Boulevard (Goldenrod Road Extension), toll road in southeastern Orlando, Florida, United States
- USS General Stuart Heintzelman (AP-159), transport ship for the U.S. Navy in World War II
- Heintzman (disambiguation)
