= John Clark Murray =

Scottish philosopher and professor

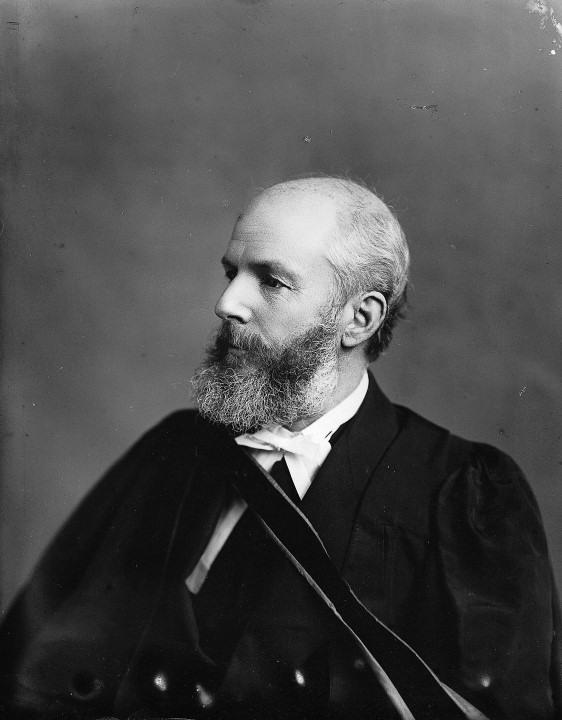
- Murray in Montreal in 1884
- Born: 19 March 1836; Scotland
- Died: 20 November 1917 (aged 81)
- Spouse: Margaret Polson Murray (m. 1865)
- Children: 5

Academic background
- Education: University of Glasgow; University of Edinburgh

John Clark Murray FRSC (19 March 1836 – 20 November 1917) was a Scottish-Canadian philosopher and professor. He held the Chair of Mental and Moral Philosophy at Queen's University from 1862 to 1872, and at McGill University from 1872 until 1903. During his academic career, Murray became the first professor at Queen's to offer courses to women; however, his equality advocacy caused unrest among the male professors. He was married to Margaret Polson Murray who founded the Imperial Order Daughters of the Empire.

== Early life ==
Murray was born on 19 March 1836 in Scotland. He attended Paisley Grammar School in Renfrewshire, Scotland, and was educated at the University of Glasgow and University of Edinburgh.

== Career ==
After further study at Heidelberg University and University of Göttingen, Murray was appointed a professor of philosophy and Chair of Mental and Moral Philosophy at Queen's College, Kingston in Canada. In 1869, he became the first professor at Queen's to offer courses to women, nearly a decade before the University of Toronto followed suit. Murray stayed at Queen's until 1871 when he accepted a position at McGill University as their Frothingham Professor of Mental and Moral Philosophy. Upon succeeding a retiring William Turnbull Leach, Murray became the only philosophy professor at the university until 1886. As a result of his academic achievements, Murray was the recipient of an honorary LL.D from the University of Glasgow.

At McGill, Murray was not deterred from continuing to advocate for women to attend university, despite pushback from fellow professors. He also lectured at the Montreal Ladies' Educational Association, the Kingston Ladies Educational Association, the Glenmore Summer School of Philosophy, the Cooper Union and the People's Institute in New York City, and the Presbyterian College of Montreal. His continued advocacy caused problems between him and McGill Principal John William Dawson, which forced Murray to retire from teaching in 1903. The height of their confrontations occurred during a women's graduation ceremony, where Murray spoke favourably of including women in men's spaces at McGill. Dawson described Murray's comments as "subversive of the morals and discipline of the university". Murray was also one of the original members of the Royal Society of Canada.

== Personal life ==
Murray and his wife, Margaret, had four daughters and one son together.

== Selected publications ==
- A Handbook of Psychology (1885)
- The industrial kingdom of God (written in 1887, published in 1982)
- Introduction to Psychology (1904)
