= Margaret Polson Murray =

Canadian social reformer (1844–1927)

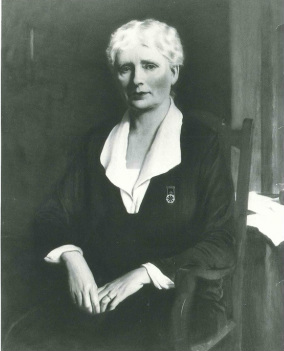
- Born: Margaret Polson; June 1, 1844; Paisley, Renfrewshire, Scotland
- Died: January 27, 1927 (aged 82); Montreal, Canada
- Occupations: Social reformer; writer
- Spouse: John Clark Murray (m. 1865)
- Children: 5

Margaret Smith Murray (née Polson; born June 1, 1844 – January 27, 1927), better known as Margaret Polson Murray, was a Canadian social reformer, magazine editor and founder of the Imperial Order Daughters of the Empire. (Note: Also known as Mrs Clark Murray in some sources (Small 1995, p. 76), because she was married to John Clark Murray (a professor at McGill University).)

Margaret Smith Polson was born in Paisley, Scotland and married Scottish philosopher John Clark Murray in 1865. The couple moved to Kingston, Ontario. In 1872, he accepted an appointment at McGill University and the family, now with three small children, headed to Montreal. The Murrays would have two more children.

In 1875, she co-founded the Montreal Young Women’s Christian Association. She began to write articles on social issues. In 1891, she founded and edited a short-lived illustrated children's magazine, The Young Canadian. In 1900, she began organizing chapters of the Federation of Daughters of the Empire across Canada, with headquarters in Montreal. The Toronto branch of the Victoria League, formed in England in 1901, claimed that the Federation was in competition with their organization; the bitter feud ended up involving Mary Elliot-Murray-Kynynmound, Countess of Minto, wife of Governor-General Gilbert Elliot-Murray-Kynynmound, 4th Earl of Minto. The Toronto chapter took over leadership and became the headquarters with the new name of Imperial Order of the Daughters of Empire, but the feud continued. By 1927, the year of Margaret Polson Murray's death in Montreal, there were some 650 chapters in Canada and elsewhere.
