= Heintzman House =

Coordinates: 43°49′25.75″N 79°24′58.87″W

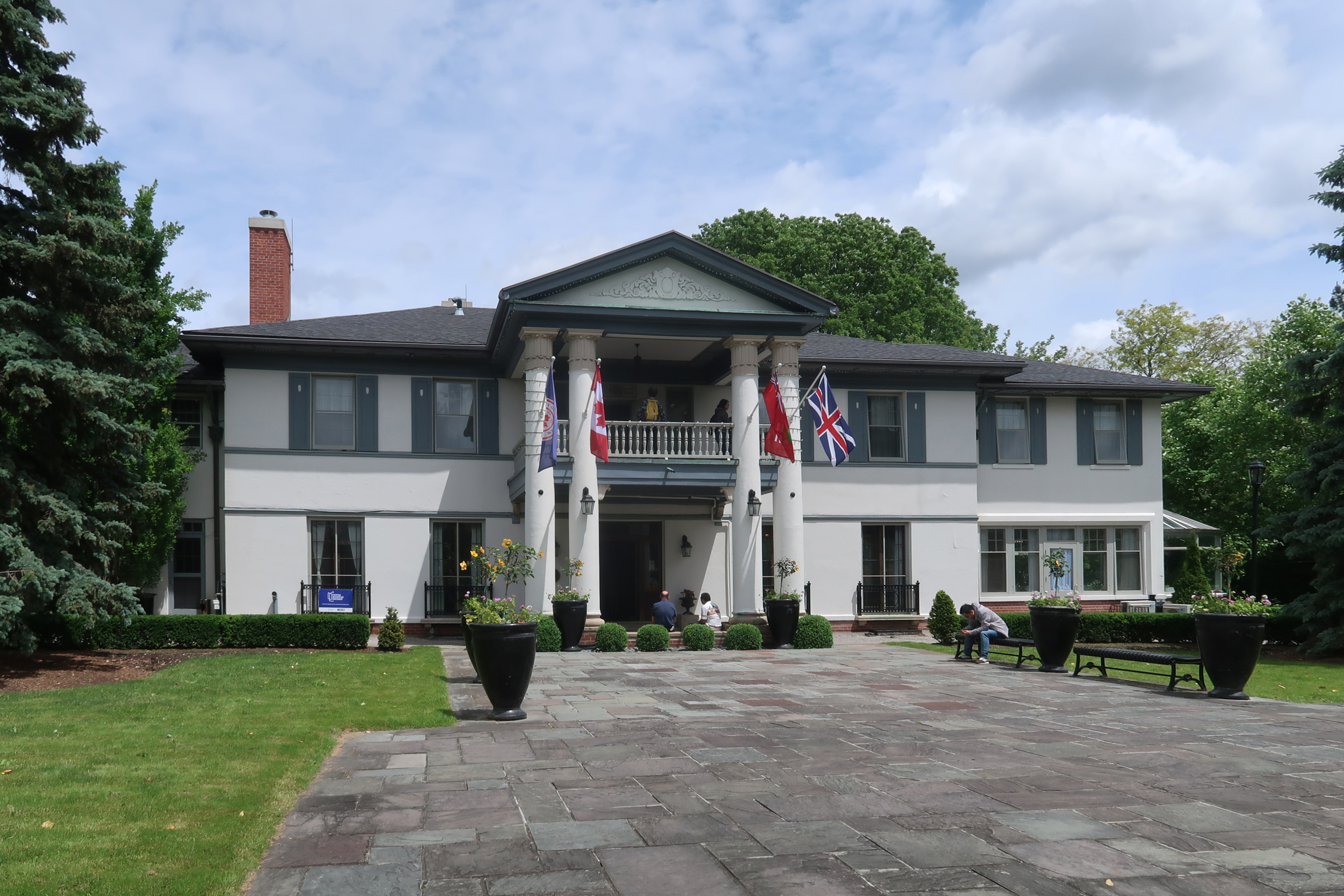

General information
- Location: Markham, Ontario, Canada
- Completed: c. 1817
Designations
Ontario Heritage Act
- Designated: 1984

The Heintzman House (c. 1817), also known as Sunnyside Manor Farm, is one of the oldest buildings in Thornhill-Markham, Ontario, where it sits on the crest of Bay Thorn Drive.

== History ==
=== Hollingshead Mudhouse ===
The Yonge Street Crown Grant property (Lot 32, Concession 1, Markham) was awarded to United Empire Loyalist Anthony Hollingshead in July 1798. Hollingshead, originally from New Jersey, was a veteran of the American Revolutionary War, serving as an officer with the 3rd New Jersey Volunteers under the command of General Cortlandt Skinner. He had participated of the property's first owner, United Empire Loyalist Anthony Hollingshead. in the Loyalists' July 1780 Battle of the Blockhouse victory at Bergen Wood, New Jersey during the closing days of the American Revolutionary War.

Prior to receiving the patent (final property deed), Crown Grant recipients had to complete settlement duties which included clearing land for cultivation, building a home no less than 16 feet (4.9 m) by 20 feet (6.1 m) in size, and clearing the land facing Yonge Street for use as a public road. Settlers were given two years to complete their duties, extensions were often granted. Anthony, his wife Elizabeth, son Anthony Jr., including a daughter, her husband and child all made their home in a modest two- room, one-half storey adobe brick farmhouse.

The Heintzman House's original structure was an example of an early mudhouse and is on record as the earliest built in the province. It was constructed with adobe brick, fired brick and frame construction. The central five bays of the current structure are believed to have been incorporated into the existing house, which has seen several additions and changes over the past many years. Anthony Hollingshead received the patent (deed) to the 190-acre (0.77 km^{2}) property in 1802 after completing his settlement duties.

=== Crookshank Sunnyside Manor ===
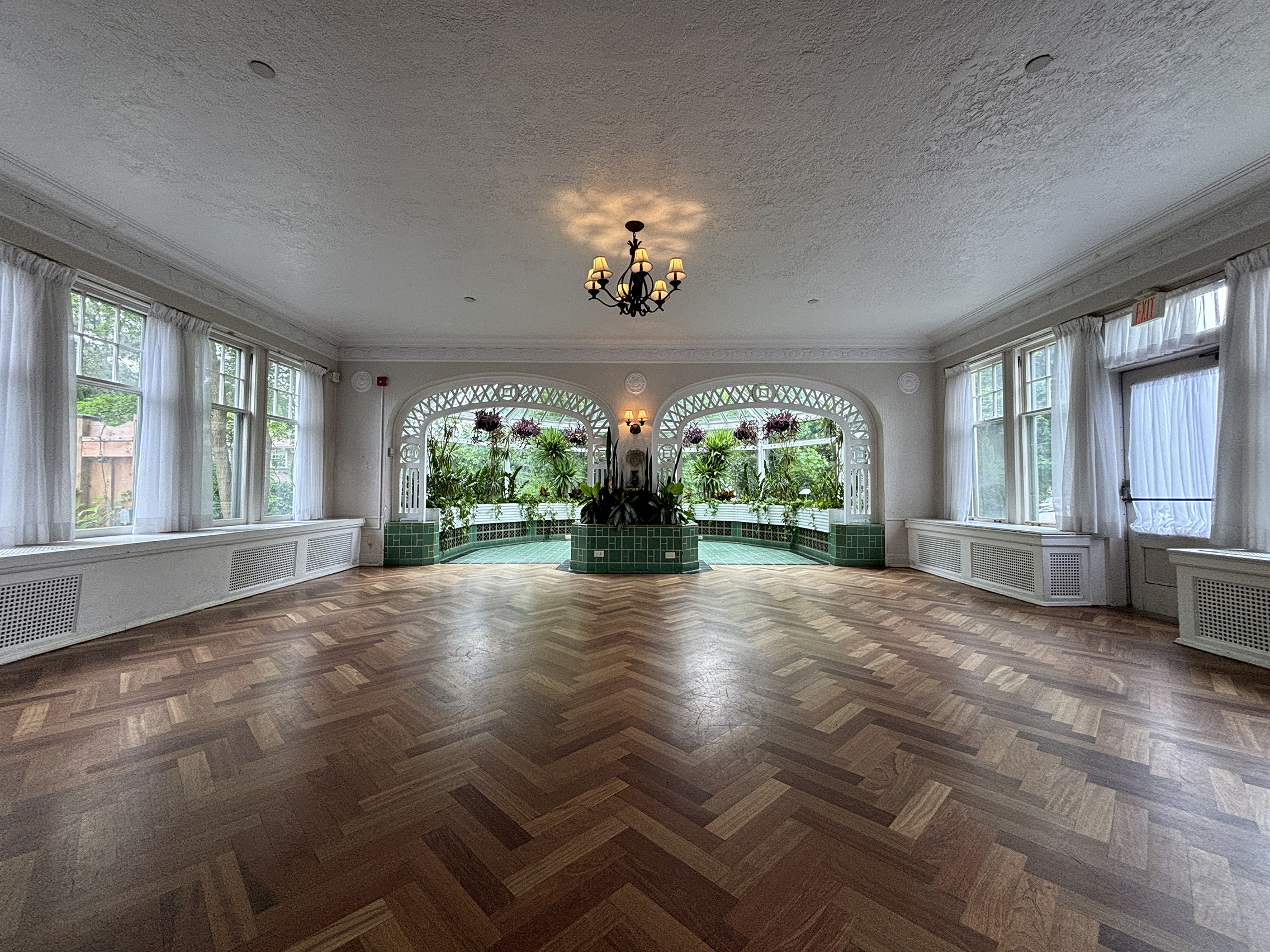
The sunroom.

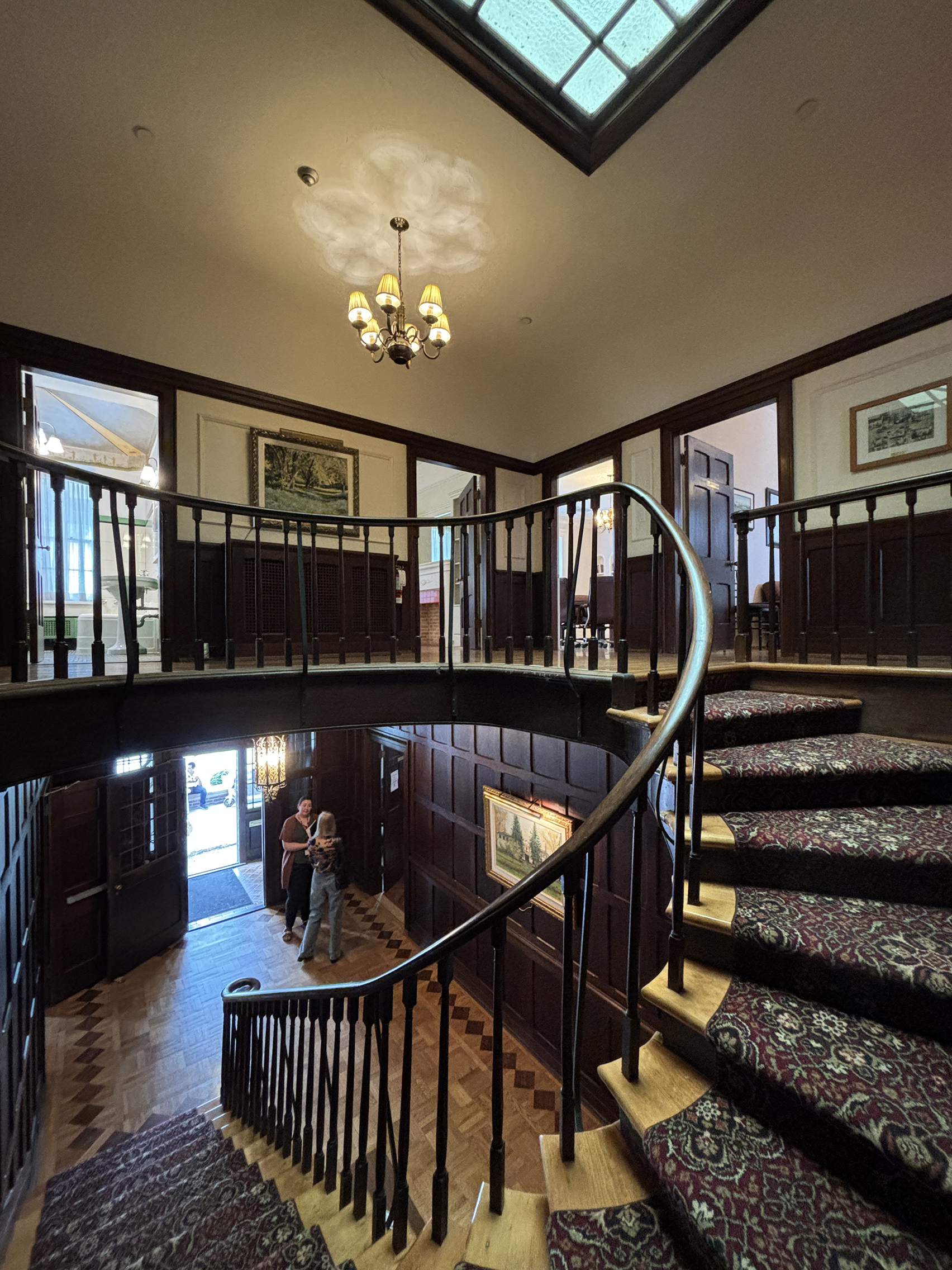
Stairs

In 1817, possibly upon the death of Anthony, the Hollingshead family sold the property, and would later revert to the United States following execution of Anthony's granddaughter Elizabeth Soules Lount's husband, Samuel, for his role in the Upper Canada Rebellion of 1837.

Based on land registry records, the second owner was the Honourable George Crookshank of York (Toronto). George, the son of a Loyalist, was a prominent member of Upper Canada society devoting much of his professional career to government service. Crookshank, a trusted friend and confidant of Lieutenant Governor John Graves Simcoe, would hold many important positions; Assistant Commissary General in 1796, Receiver General of Public Accounts 1819, Director of the Bank of Upper Canada in 1822 and would serve as a member of the Legislative Council between 1821 and 1841. Crookshank, a man of great wealth, spared no expense in building a 13-room mansion on the site of the Hollingshead farmhouse. The black walnut wood paneling and moulding seen throughout the house dates to this period and was milled from trees harvested from the estate. The additions by Crookshank gave the home a mix of Classic Revival and Georgian-look.

In 1859, upon his death at 86 years of age, George Crookshank was remembered for his staunch Loyalists beliefs, his generous nature and charitable activities. Catherine Crookshank Hewerd, his only surviving child, inherited not only the Thornhill estate but also vast tracts of property in the city of Toronto.

The farm property, known as Sunnyside Manor, would pass through many hands until purchased in 1881 by John Francis of Newtonbrook. Sons Samuel and Elijah were set up on the property as farmers; Elijah would eventually sell his share of the property to his brother Samuel and move to England.

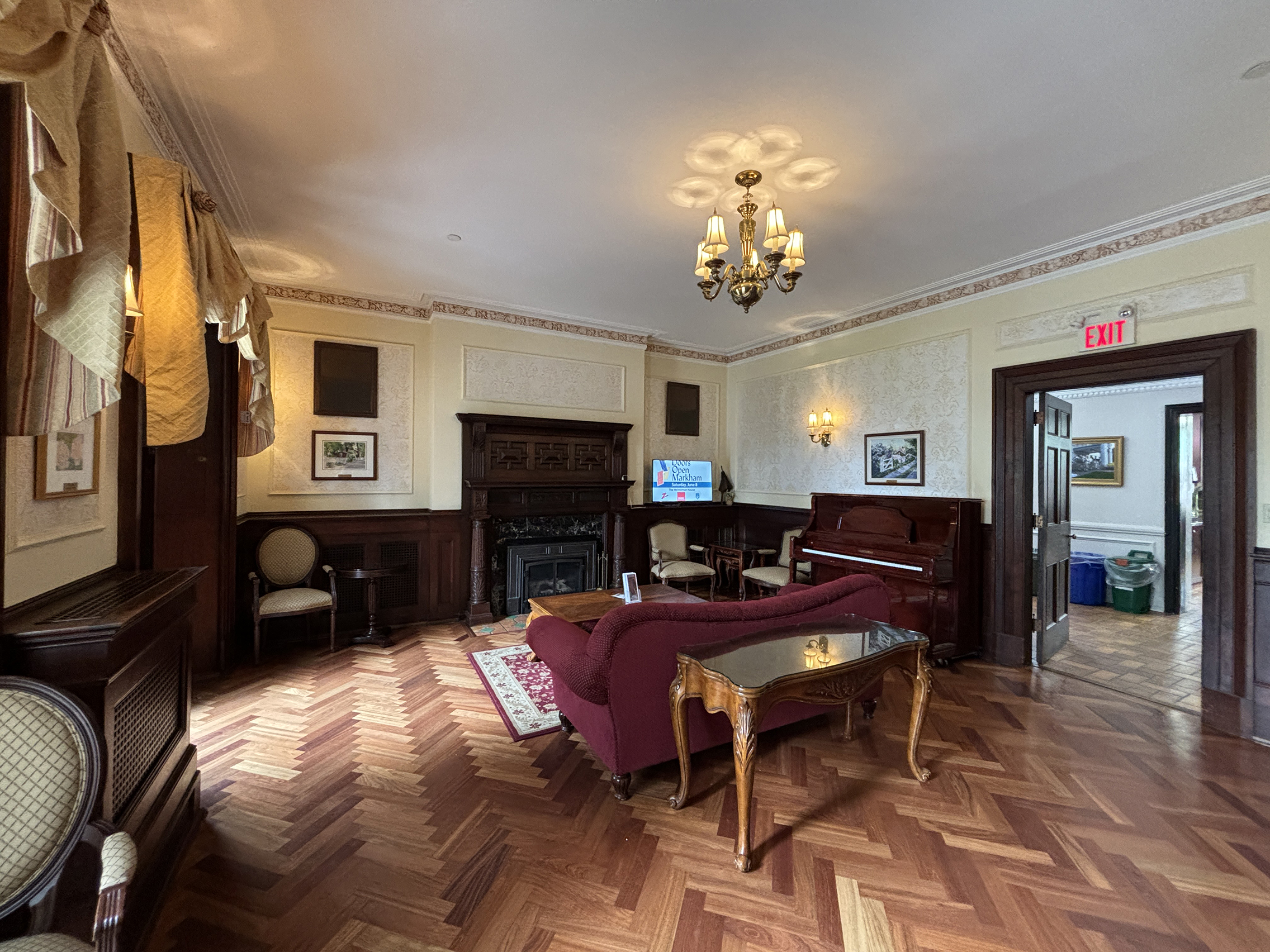
Hollingshead Room

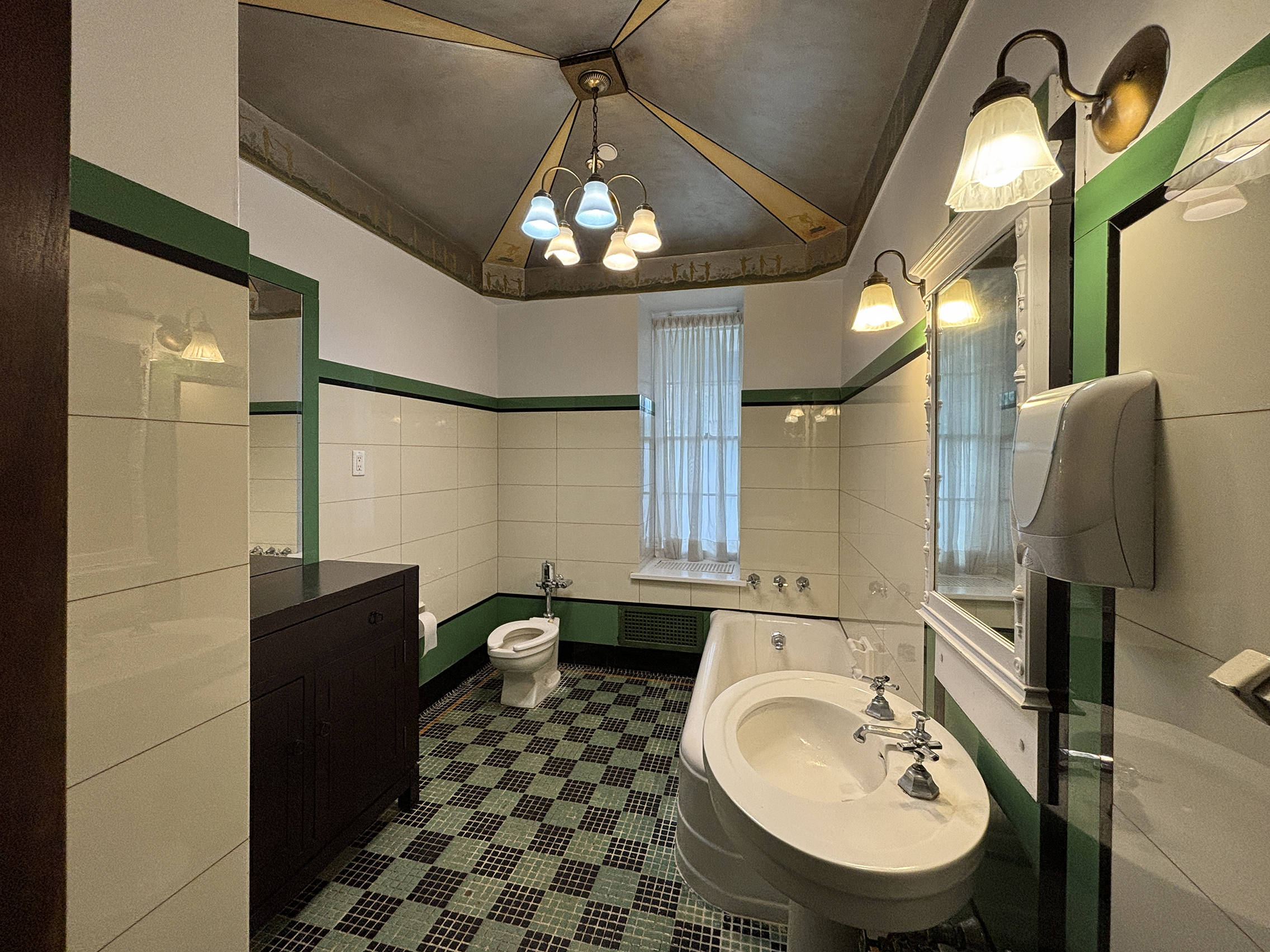
Bathroom

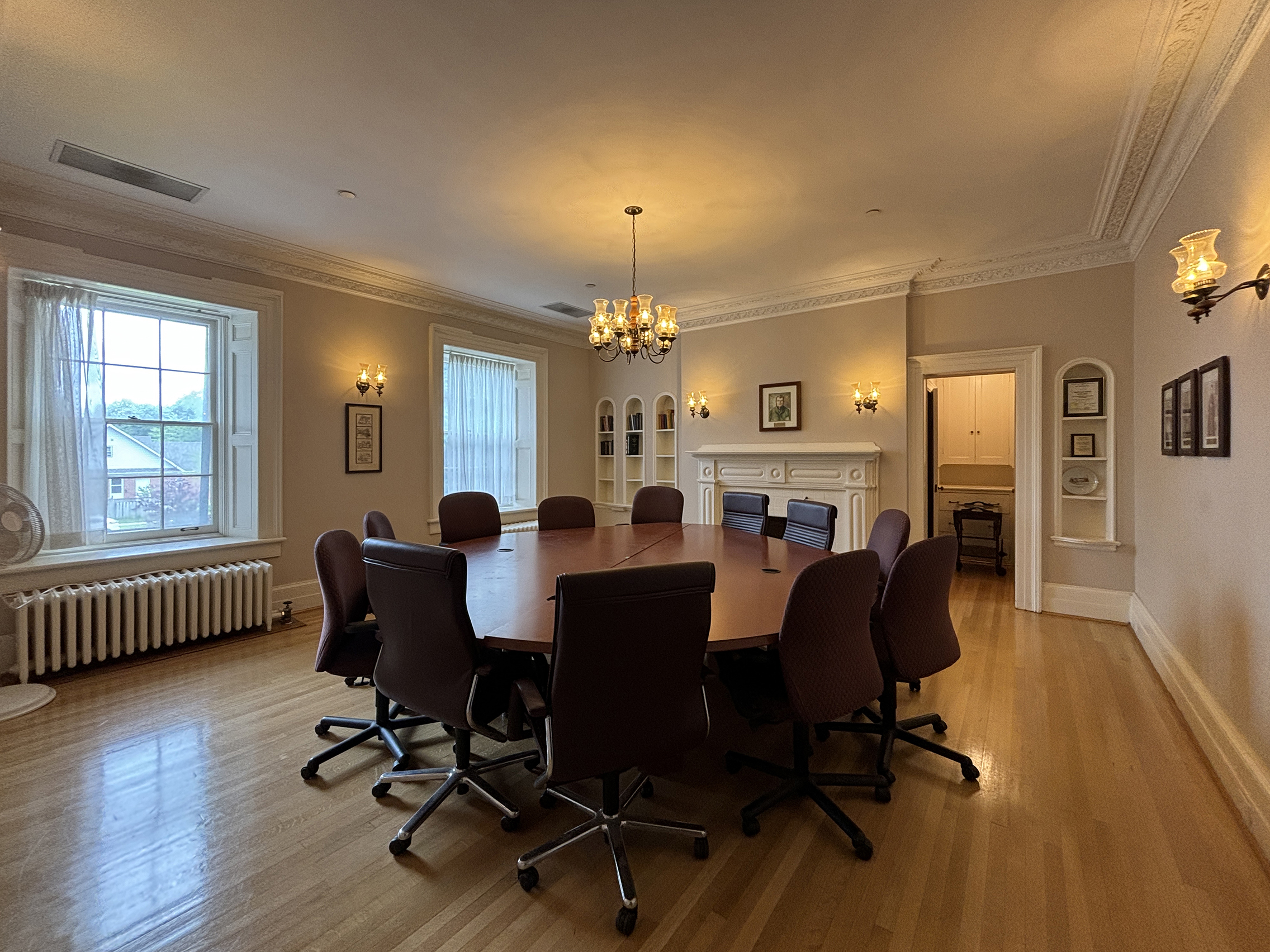
Conference room

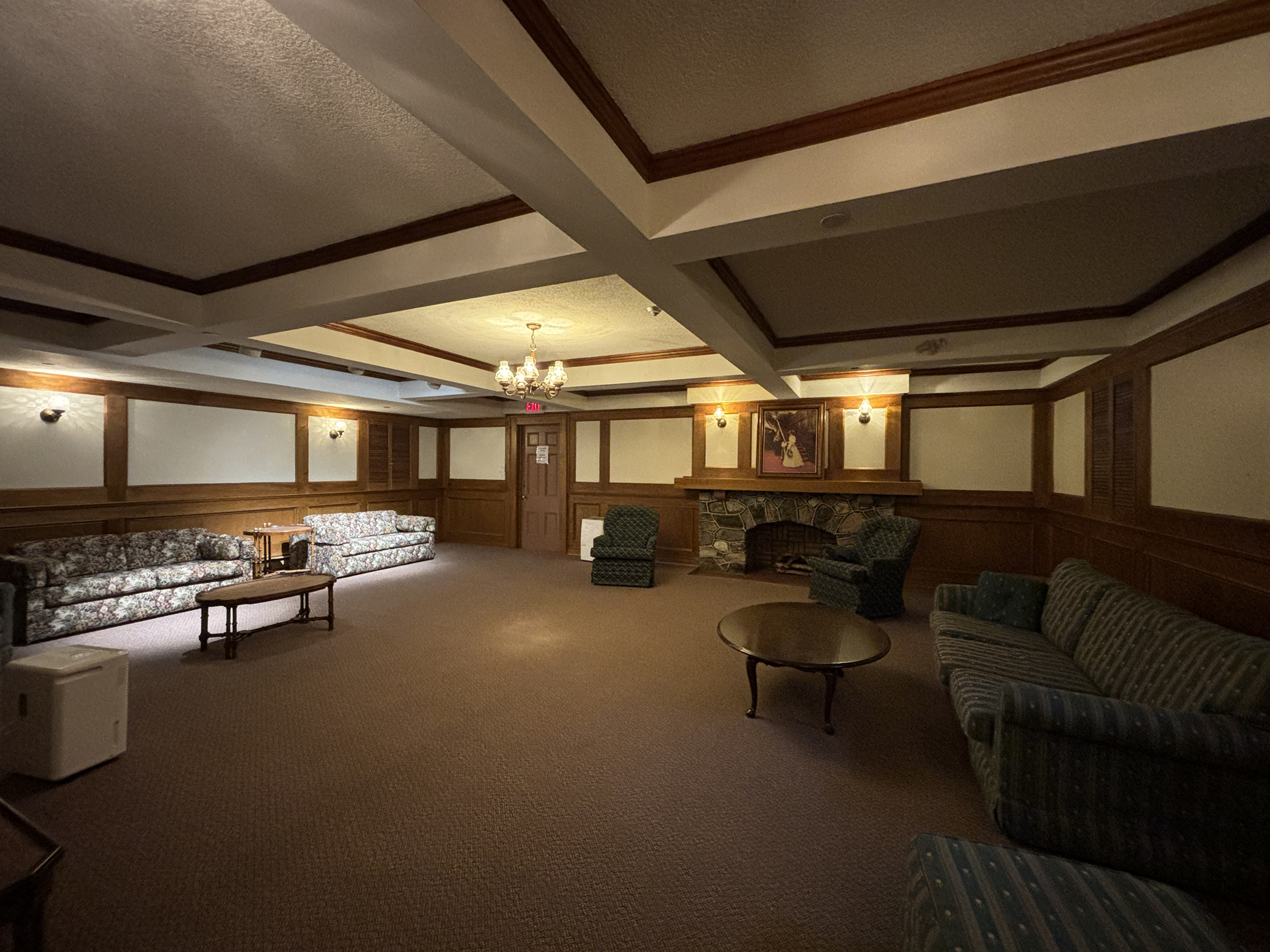
Room in basement

=== Heintzman additions ===
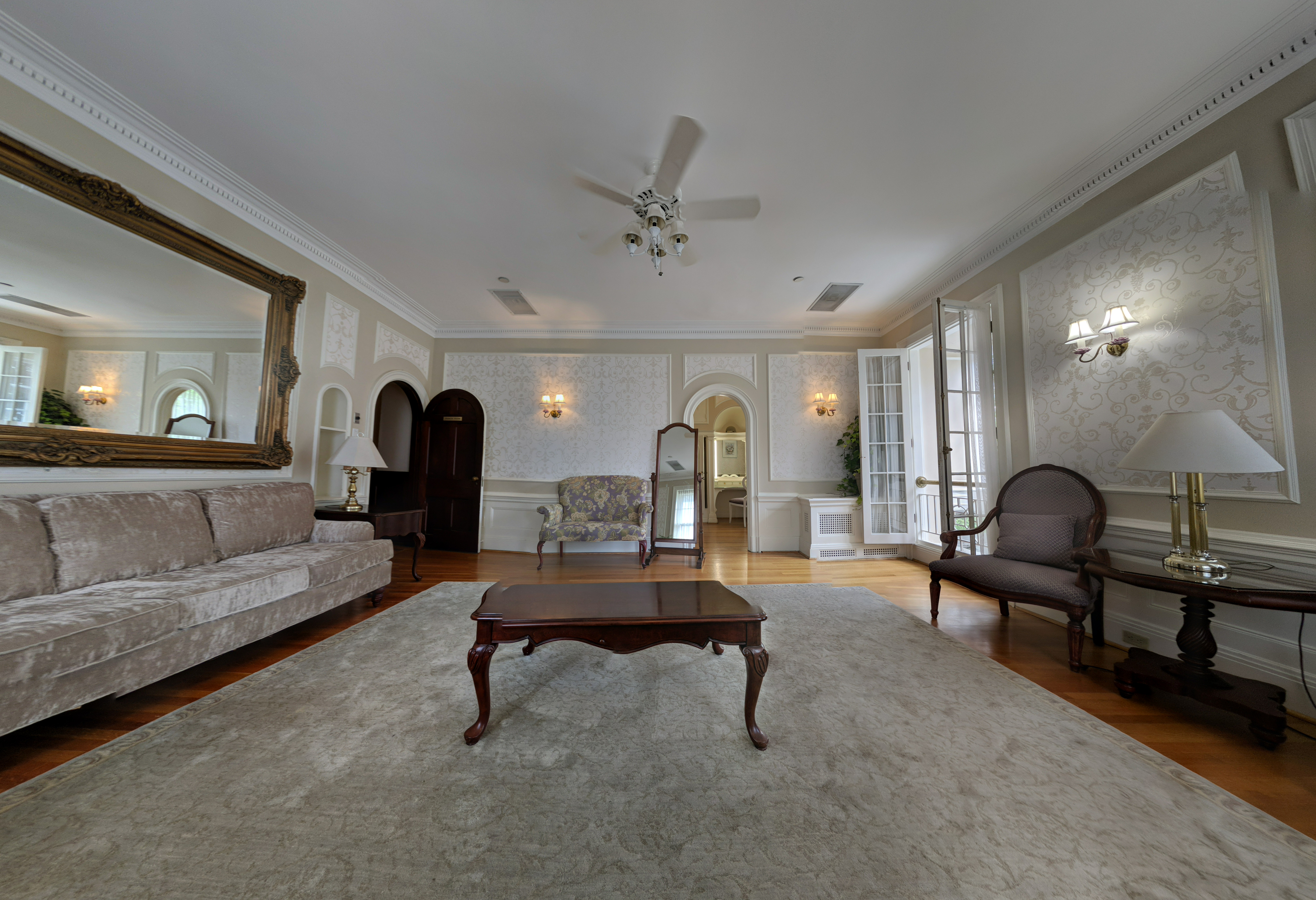
The master bedroom.

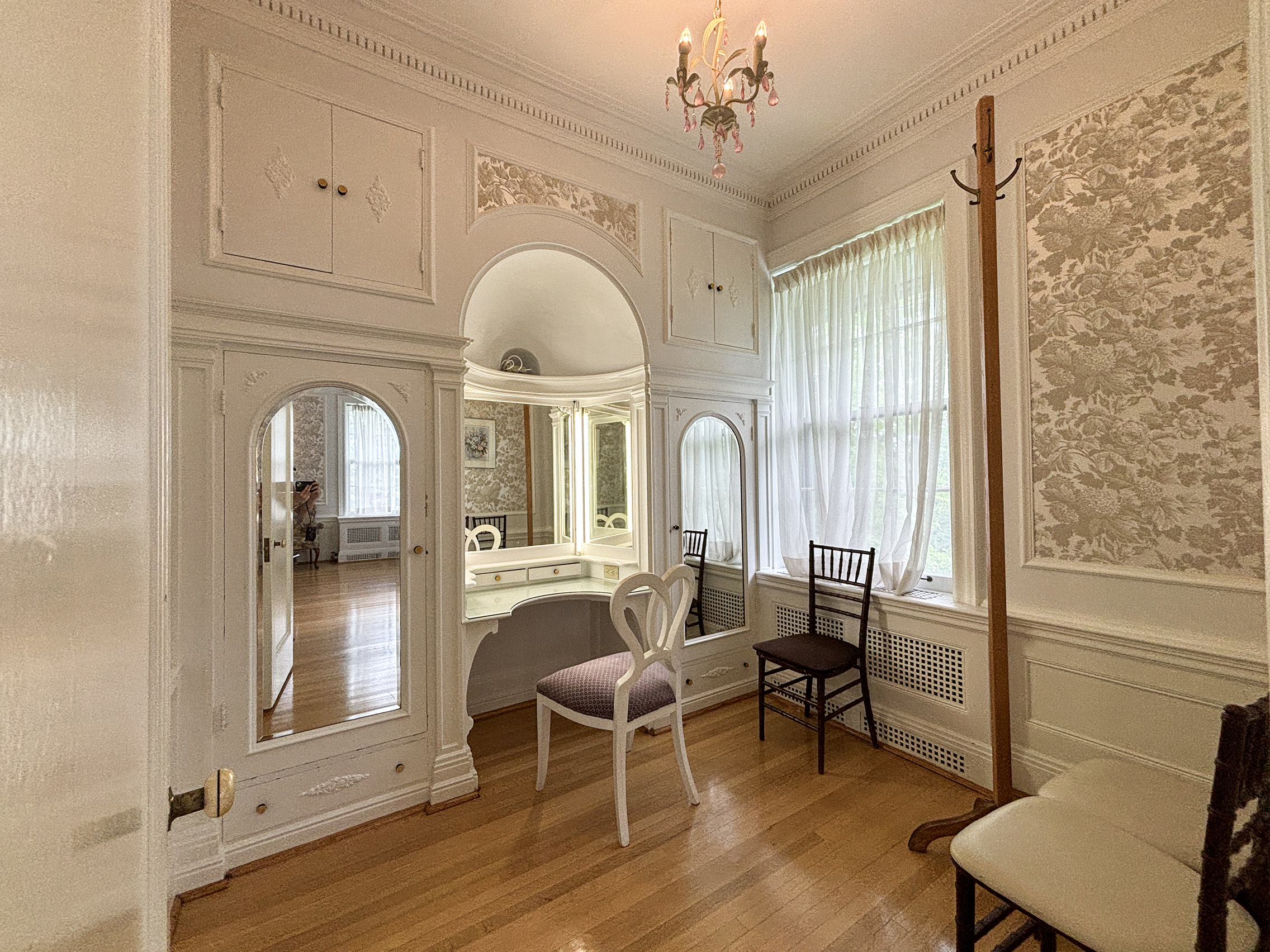
Dressing room

Charles Theodore Heintzman and his wife, Marion, purchased Sunnyside Manor in 1930 from Samuel Francis for the reported amount of $100,000. Charles, the son of Herman and Lucy Heintzman, was the grandson of Theodor August Heintzman, founder of the Heintzman Piano Company of Toronto.

Charles was born in Toronto and educated at St. Andrews College; after graduation he served his apprenticeship in the family's piano manufacturing business. Charles would eventually become a director and by 1950 became a vice president of the company. Charles was a keen outdoors man, and both of the Heintzmans were interested in farming and kept a herd of prized Jersey cattle on their Thornhill property.

Mr. and Mrs. Heintzman added the pillars and portico as well as the conservatory; a garage and servant's quarters, taking care that these and other alterations (mix of Georgian and Regency) would preserve the character and unique features of the house. Charles Heintzman died at Sunnyside Manor in September 1954; Marion Heintzman died within a few years of Charles' death.

=== Municipal preservation ===
In 1959, Sunnyside Manor was sold to real estate developers for the reported amount of $880,000. There was a concern that the developers were planning to demolish the house to make room for a high-rise apartment. Residents in the area, led by Alan Sumner, opposed the plan and launched a campaign to save Sunnyside Manor and were successful in convincing the then Town of Markham to purchase the property in 1966. The house was renamed Heintzman House in honour of the last private owner and was, for a time, used as offices for the Town of Markham Recreation and Parks Department and as a community centre.

In 1984, the Heintzman House received designation as a heritage site under the Ontario Heritage Act. In May 2000, the Heintzman House became, with Fort York and Queen's Park, one of three properties in the Greater Toronto Area at which the United Empire Loyalists' Association of Canada made a special presentation of the First Union Flag in recognition of Anthony Hollingshead; a reunion of the Hollingshead clan took place there not long afterwards, in July 2000.

The Heintzman House is today a venue for weddings, parties, receptions and other special events, and is used by local organizations, for business meetings, and in commercial and film work. The most renowned use of Heintzman House is the hosting of weekly choir practices by official choir Upper Canada Chorus. The Heintzman House Auxiliary, many of whose original members were involved in the campaign to save the house from demolition, play an important role in its upkeep and, since 1971, have organized an annual craft show fundraiser with proceeds going to the refurbishment of the house. A board of directors appointed by the City of Markham manages the Heintzman House.

== See also ==
- Heintzman & Co.
- List of historic buildings in Markham, Ontario
- Theodor August Heintzman
