= Theodor August Heintzman =

German-Canadian inventor (1817–1899)

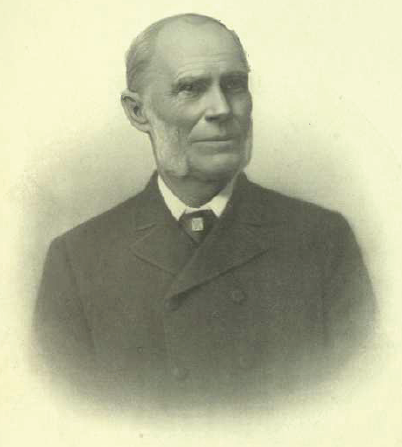
- Born: 19 May 1817; Berlin, Germany
- Died: 25 July 1899 (aged 82); Toronto, Ontario, Canada
- Occupations: piano manufacturer and inventor
- Known for: Founder of Heintzman & Co.

Theodor August Heintzman (birth name Theodore August Heintzmann) (19 May 1817 – 25 July 1899) was a German-Canadian piano manufacturer (Heintzman & Co.) and inventor, best known for founding the piano company which still bears his name.

Born in Berlin, Heintzman worked in various manufacturing jobs as a youth, eventually settling in at a German piano factory. In 1840, he married his boss' daughter and, following the lead of her family, immigrated to the United States in 1850.

It is believed by the Heintzman family that Theodor immigrated on the same boat as Heinrich Engelhard Steinweg, another piano-maker, and the two attempted to start a business in New York City. They soon parted ways, however, with Heintzman taking his family to Buffalo where he started again; Steinweg eventually changed his name to Steinway and became a successful piano manufacturer in his own right. In Buffalo, Heintzman worked at Keogh Piano Company (located at what is now Fireman's Park) before he started the a piano forte firm with Francis Drew and Henry Annowsky (1853 as Drew, Heintzman and Annowsky at 10 and Court Street), which he ran until it went under in 1858. From 1858 to 1860 Heintzman ran Western Pianoforte Manufactory Company in Hamilton, Canada West (founded in 1856 by Charles Thomas).

In 1860, Heintzman moved to Toronto, where he constructed his first four pianos in the kitchen of his son-in-law; these sold well, and with the proceeds he was able to found Heintzman & Co., Ltd., setting up his primary warehouse first on Toronto's York Street, soon moving to King Street near Yonge.

Heintzman enjoyed a reputation as a grand showman, often performing on his pianos as part of his sales pitch. Of note is that Heintzman took several of his pianos with him on the first trans-Canadian rail trip, which he used both as a means for sale and advertising.

Heintzman pianos soon grew steadily in reputation, and as a result, Heintzman became a very wealthy man. He and his four adult sons (all of whom were in the family business) settled into West Toronto Junction which was, at the time, a separate town from Toronto. Heintzman's estate, built in 1889, was called "The Birches", and despite some internal modifications, it still stands on Annette Street, across the street from Annette Street Public School. A property developer's plan to tear it down in the early 1980s sparked a protest from local citizens, and a compromise was reached wherein the exterior has been restored in the original Queen Anne Revival style. Two of his sons' homes in the area are also still standing: Herman Heintzman's home on High Park Avenue and George Heinztman's house on Woodside Avenue. A larger estate of George's in Thornhill, Ontario is also still standing.

The Junction was also home to the primary Heintzman factory prior to the moving of operations to Hanover (today, most Heintzman pianos are made in China). Heintzman Street, a short, dead-end road which runs just north of Dundas Street, formerly led to the Junction factory, which in its heyday employed over 200 craftsmen, making it one of the largest Canadian factories of any kind for its time. A nearby Lutheran Church, which Heintzman and his family attended, bears a plaque memorializing Heintzman's contributions to both the Junction and the piano industry.

He died in 1899, shortly after the death of his wife.

== See also ==
- Heintzman House - historic home in Thornhill, Ontario purchased and owned by grandson Charles Heintzman.
- Samuel Nordheimer
