= Samuel Nordheimer =

Canadian businessman

- Born: February 6, 1824; Memmelsdorf, Kingdom of Bavaria
- Died: June 29, 1912 (aged 88)
- Burial place: Mount Pleasant Cemetery, Toronto
- Occupations: Music publisher and promoter
- Spouse: Edith Sarah Louisa Boulton
- Parents: Meier Nordheimer (father); Esther Nathan (mother)
- Relatives: Abraham Nordheimer (brother); Isaac Nordheimer (brother)

Samuel Nordheimer (February 6, 1824 – June 29, 1912) was a businessman and music promoter in 19th century Toronto.

In part to build this business, Nordheimer became one of the most active promoters of music in Canada. He brought prominent foreign stars to the city, such as Jenny Lind; opened a concert hall in Montreal, founded the Chamber Music Association, and for many years directed the Toronto Philharmonic Society.

== Biography ==
Born in Memmelsdorf, Bavaria, in 1839 he came with his older brother Abraham to New York City, where their older brother Isaac was already living. The brothers learned English and then Nordheimer worked as a clerk. The two brothers moved to Kingston, Ontario in 1840 and then settled in Toronto in 1844. They established a piano importing business, A.& S. Nordheimer Co.

The business prospered and expanded. It became Canada's leading publisher of sheet music, and initially had the sole right to publish copies of The Maple Leaf Forever. The company also opened branches in other cities across Canada. As well as continuing to import pianos, in 1890 the firm opened its own factory in Toronto and quickly became one of Canada's best known domestic piano brands.

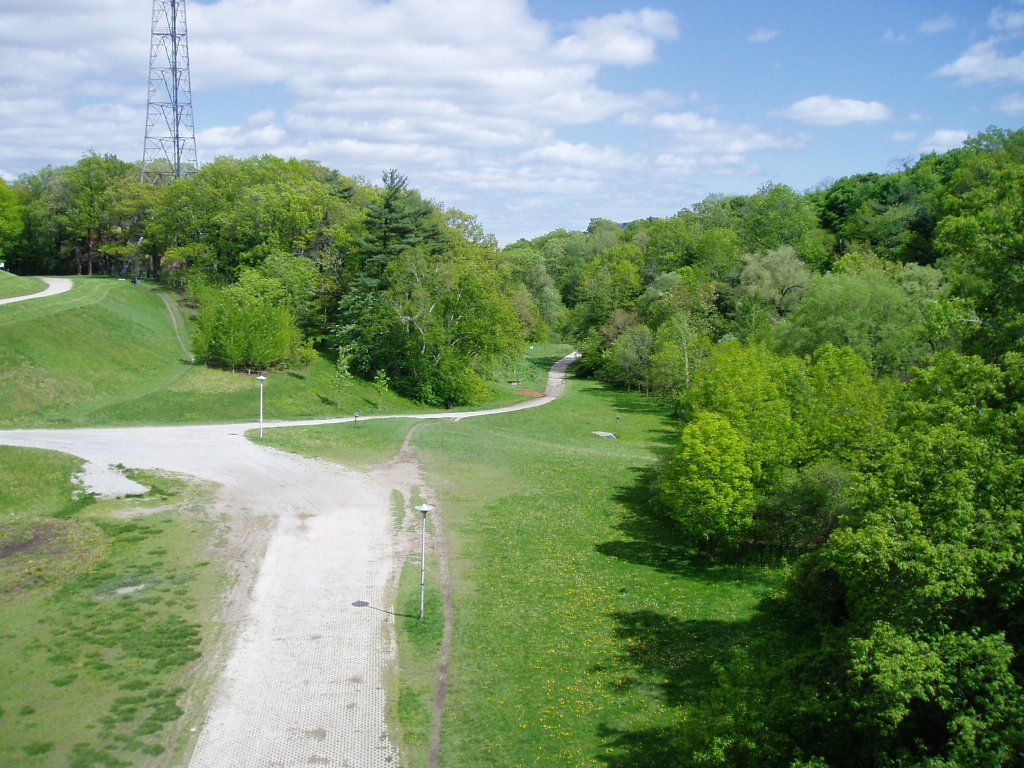
Samuel Nordheimer lent his name to the Nordheimer Ravine, which was near his residence

Nordheimer became a prominent member of the city's commercial class, serving on a number of corporate boards. In 1871, the year married Edith Boulton, Nordheimer completed work on a massive home named Glenedyth. It was located on Davenport Hill, near James Austin's Spadina House. While the house was demolished in the 1920s, the ravine running by the site is still known as the Nordheimer Ravine.

Nordheimer remained head of the company until his death, when the firm was taken over by his nephew Albert. Upon his retirement from the business in 1928, the firm was taken over by Heintzman & Co. His legacy included a section of Castle Frank Brook being named after him.

== Family ==
In 1871 Nordheimer married Edith (1847–1912) — daughter of James Boulton and Margaret Neilina. They had a son and seven daughters. Nordheimer left the Jewish faith and converted to the Anglican Church. His brother Abraham would remain a member of Toronto's Jewish faith.

His wife, Edith (née Boulton), was from a prominent Toronto family that had played a leading role in the Family Compact and had built The Grange. She was an Anglican philanthropist and imperialist who became the first national president of the Imperial Order Daughters of the Empire (IODE) in 1901 and vice-president of the Toronto South African Memorial Association at the beginning in 1904 (the association established memorials for those who had fought in the South African War (1899–1902)).

== See also ==
- List of German Canadians
- List of Canadian Jews
- Music of Canada
