= Edith Sarah Louisa Boulton =

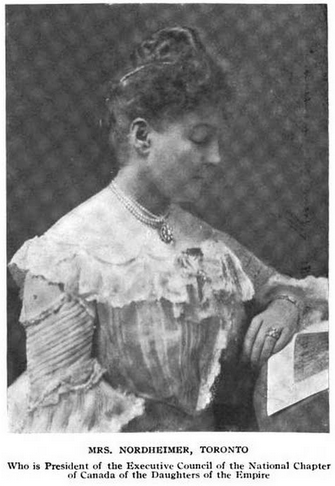
Edith Boulton Nordheimer, from a 1906 publication.

Edith Sarah Louisa Boulton (1847 – November 14, 1912) was a Canadian philanthropist and imperialist.

The daughter of James Boulton, a barrister, and Margaret Neilina Fortye, she was born in Toronto. Her grandfather D’Arcy Boulton had been attorney-general for Upper Canada.

In 1871, Boulton married Toronto businessman Samuel Nordheimer; the couple had eight daughters and three sons. She contributed to various Toronto institutions including the Infants' Home, the Hillcrest Convalescent Hospital, the Ladies' Work Depository, the Working Boys' Home, the Children's Aid Society and St. James’ Cathedral. Boulton also served on the board of governors for the Victorian Order of Nurses, was president of the local Red Cross Society and helped found the Female Immigrants Receiving Home. In 1904, she became vice-president of the Toronto South African Memorial Association.

The Imperial Order Daughters of the Empire (IODE) was established in Toronto in 1901 by a group of Ontario women with Boulton serving as its national president. The Federation of the Daughters of the Empire had been founded in Montreal the previous year but it was later decided to relocate the head office and change the name of the organization. The aim of the IODE was to promote closer ties between Canada and the British Empire. Boulton was a skilled organizer even if somewhat autocratic by nature; under her leadership the organization grew to 10,000 members with chapters across Canada and in the United States, The Bahamas, Bermuda, the Dominion of Newfoundland and India. After dissatisfaction with a delegation sent to England to attend the coronation of George V, she resigned as president in 1911 but was named patroness of the order the following year.

The couple lived in a 35-room mansion known as Glen Edyth, once considered "the finest private house in Toronto" but since demolished to allow the construction of new homes, which was located on a 25-acre estate. The current Glen Edyth Drive was originally a carriageway for the estate.

She died in Toronto at the age of 65. She was named a Lady of Grace of the Order of St John of Jerusaleml.

The children of Edith Boulton and Samuel Nordheimer were Stuart Fitzroy Boulton Nordheimer (b. 1872), Julia Melina Boulton Nordheimer (b. 1874), Samuel Max Boulton Nordheimer (b. 1876), Athol Gordon Boulton Nordheimer (b. 1877), Adeline Matilda Boulton Nordheimer (b. 1878), Edith Vera Boulton Nordheimer and Errol Louisa Boulton Nordheimer (b. 1879 - twins), Cecil Evelyn Boulton Nordheimer (b. 1881), May Estelle Boulton Nordheimer (b. 1883), G. Roy Boulton Nordheimer and Albert Boulton Nordheimer.
