= List of Jewish American linguists =

This is a list of notable Jewish American linguists. For other Jewish Americans, see Lists of Jewish Americans.

- Noam Chomsky, linguist and political philosopher
- Cyrus Gordon, Semiticist, held ancient Crete Minoan was Northwest Semitic
- Joseph Greenberg, language classification, created a unified classification of African languages
- Roman Jakobson, one of the founders of modern phonology (converted to Orthodox Christianity in 1975)
- Jay Jasanoff, Indo-European linguist
- Samuel Noah Kramer, Sumerologist, known as the "father of Assyriology and Sumerology"
- William Labov, sociolinguist, awarded the Neil and Saras Smith Medal for Linguistics by the British Academy (2015)
- María Rosa Lida de Malkiel, Spanish philologist
- Yakov Malkiel, Romance philologist
- Isaac Nordheimer, Hebrew and Syriac scholar and philologist
- Edward Sapir, anthropologist-linguist, founder of enthnolinguistics
- Dan I. Slobin, (psycho)linguist, studies linguistics and acquisition of signed languages of the deaf
- Deborah Tannen, sociolinguist with a focus on gender linguistics
