= Memmelsdorf =

- Municipality
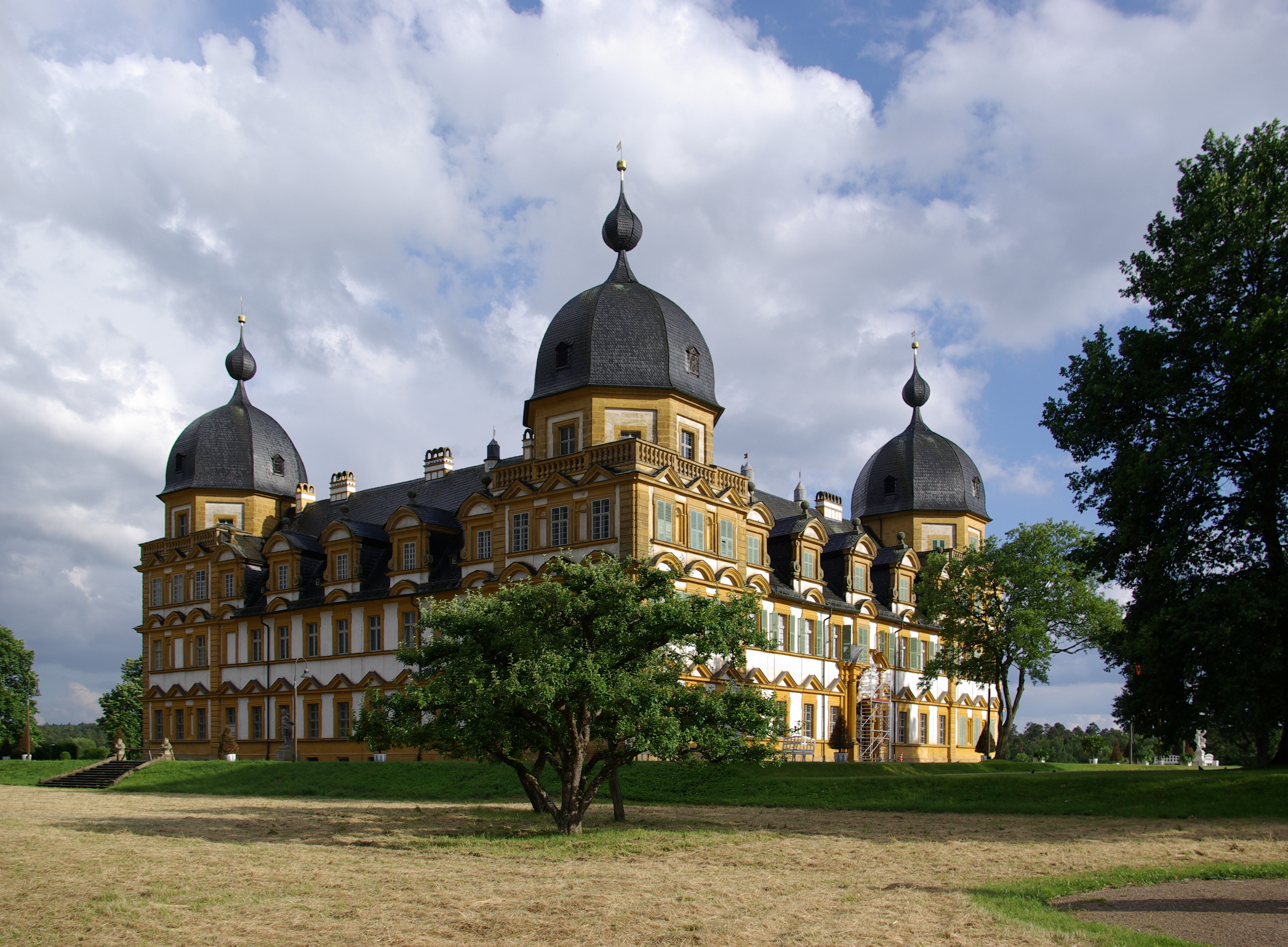
- Schloss Seehof

- Coat of arms

- Location of Memmelsdorf within Bamberg district
- Interactive map of Memmelsdorf
- Location within Germany Location within Bavaria
- Coordinates: 49°55′58″N 10°57′12″E
- Country: Germany
- State: Bavaria
- Admin. region: Oberfranken
- District: Bamberg
- Subdivisions: 9 Ortsteile

Government
  - Mayor (2020–26): Gerd Schneider (SPD)

Area
  - Total: 26.16 km^{2} (10.10 sq mi)
- Elevation: 262 m (860 ft)

Population (2025-12-31)
  - Total: 8,726
  - Density: 333.6/km^{2} (863.9/sq mi)
- Time zone: UTC+01:00 (CET)
  - Summer (DST): UTC+02:00 (CEST)
- Postal codes: 96117
- Dialling codes: 0951, 09505, 09542
- Vehicle registration: BA
- Website: www.memmelsdorf.de

Memmelsdorf is a municipality in the Upper Franconian district of Bamberg bordering in the west directly on the city of Bamberg, Bavaria, Germany.

== History ==
As with most places in the Bamberg district, this community's exact founding time cannot be established. However, looking back through the properties of the royal chamber estate in Memmelsdorf yields a founding time sometime about 900. Since there were no local monasteries at that time, there is today a lack of historical accounts about settlement here.

About 1120, evidence crops up of Mam’s, Mamo’s or Memo’s village (Dorf in German). A Frank by the name of Mamo is the namesake of Memenstorf, Memistorf, Mamestorf or Mamenestorf – the place now known as Memmelsdorf. From road names that have been handed down it is assumed that this founding, lying between two brooks, safeguarded old traffic routes.

- 900 Founding of the royal chamber estate
- 1120 Founding of Mamo's village
- 1248 Founding of Memmelsdorf lower court district

Memmelsdorf belonged to the High Monastery at Bamberg and was the seat of a princely Vogt (reeve). Since the Reichsdeputationshauptschluss of 1803, the community has belonged to Bavaria. In the course of administrative reform in Bavaria, today's community came into being under the Gemeindeedikt (“Community Edict”) of 1818.

=== Population development ===
Population development since 1840
Year	Inhabitants	Inhabitants/km^{2}
1840	1,869	71
1871	2,109	81
1900	2,096	80
1925	2,179	83
1939	2,496	95
1950	3,623	138
1961	5,693	218
1970	6,582	252
1987	7,893	302
2002	8,950	342
2004	9,262	354

=== Constituent communities ===
Until 1953, the community of Memmelsdorf consisted only of the centre named Memmelsdorf and the nearby Schloss Seehof (castle).

Great changes came to the community through administrative reform. Since the voluntary merger with five formerly autonomous communities in 1972, the community of Memmelsdorf has consisted of the following centres, each given here with its own population figure:

- Drosendorf 1,374
- Kremmeldorf 253
- Laubend 144
- Lichteneiche 2,171
  This centre was founded after the Second World War to house those driven out of formerly German lands east of the Oder and Neiße. The first dwellers moved into their new homes in 1954. Lichteneiche quickly developed into a typical suburban neighbourhood. Important institutions are the home for the elderly, the gliderport and the Sport-Club Lichteneiche (founded in 1955).
- Meedensdorf 228
- Memmelsdorf 3,159
- Merkendorf 840
- Schloss Seehof 8
- Schmerldorf 175
- Weichendorf 613

(as of 31 May 2005)

== Religion ==
Memmelsdorf is the seat of the Catholic parish of Maria Himmelfahrt, whose area includes Memmelsdorf and the outlying centres of Drosendorf, Kremmeldorf, Meedensdorf, Schloss Seehof, Schmerldorf and Weichendorf. Since 1974, the parish priest has been Lothar Güthlein. Working with him since September 2006 has been the Pastoralreferent Andreas Lößlein. (A Pastoralreferent is roughly a “lay pastor” who assists a clergyman; this is a profession only found in German-speaking Europe and the Netherlands).

Until 1978, the outlying centre of Kremmeldorf partly belonged to the parish of Peulendorf.

Within the municipal area there is also the Catholic parish of Kreuzerhöhung (“Triumph of the Cross”) Merkendorf, within whose area is found the outlying centre of Laubend.

Lichteneiche originally belonged to the Memmelsdorf parish, but is now a Memmelsdorf branch parish.

At Whitsun 2006, the Catholic Seelsorgeeinheit (“parish cluster”) Pfarreiengemeinschaft Memmelsdorf mit Lichteneiche, Gundelsheim und Merkendorf was founded. The head priest is Father Marianus Schramm from the parish of Gundelsheim.

Lichteneiche is the seat of the Evangelical parish of Christi Himmelfahrt.

=== Catholic churches ===
- Drosendorf: Hl. Dreifaltigkeit
- Kremmeldorf: Heiliges Herz Jesu
- Laubend: Kapelle Mariä Empfängnis
- Lichteneiche: Heilig Geist
- Meedensdorf: Kapelle Schmerzhafte Mutter Gottes
- Memmelsdorf: Pfarrkirche Mariä Himmelfahrt
- Merkendorf: Kreuzerhöhung
- Schloss Seehof: Kapelle
- Weichendorf: Kapelle Heilige Anna

=== Evangelical church ===
Lichteneiche: Christi Himmelfahrt

== Politics ==
=== Community council ===
Community council seat apportionment(8 March 2026)
Christlich-Soziale Union/Freie Wählergemeinschaft (CSU/FWG)	34.9%	7 seats
Sozialdemokratische Partei Deutschlands (SPD)	11.4%	2 seats
Vereinigte Wählergemeinschaft Memmelsdorf (VWG)	14%	3 seats
Bürgerblock Lichteneiche (BBL)	9.2%	2 seats
Wählerliste Weichendorf (WLW)	6.1%	1 seats
Aktive Bürger Drosendorf (ABD)	12.9%	3 seats
GRÜNE Liste/Unabhängige Liste Memmelsdorf (GRÜNE L/ULMe)	11.4%	2 seats
Total		20 seats

=== Coat of arms ===
If Memmelsdorf had its own seal at the time when it belonged to the High Monastery at Bamberg, nothing is now known of it. Only in the time of the Kingdom of Bavaria did the municipal administration bear the then customary service seal. On 5 December 1963, the Bavarian State Ministry of the Interior gave its approval for the community to bear a coat of arms. At the same time, the Ministry also gave its approval for the community to bear a flag. It shows three stripes coloured black, yellow and green, and may be borne with the arms. The Upper Franconian government approved on 1 July 1973 the community council's decision on 30 January 1973 to make the coat of arms valid for the whole, newly expanded community.

Memmelsdorf's arms might heraldically be described thus: Party per pale Or and argent, Or a Zentrichter (roughly “lower court judge”) with cloak and hat sable holding in the hand dexter a staff argent and in the sinister a book Or, vert emerging from a three knolled hill vert an oaktree with acorns Or.

== Culture and sightseeing ==
=== Buildings ===
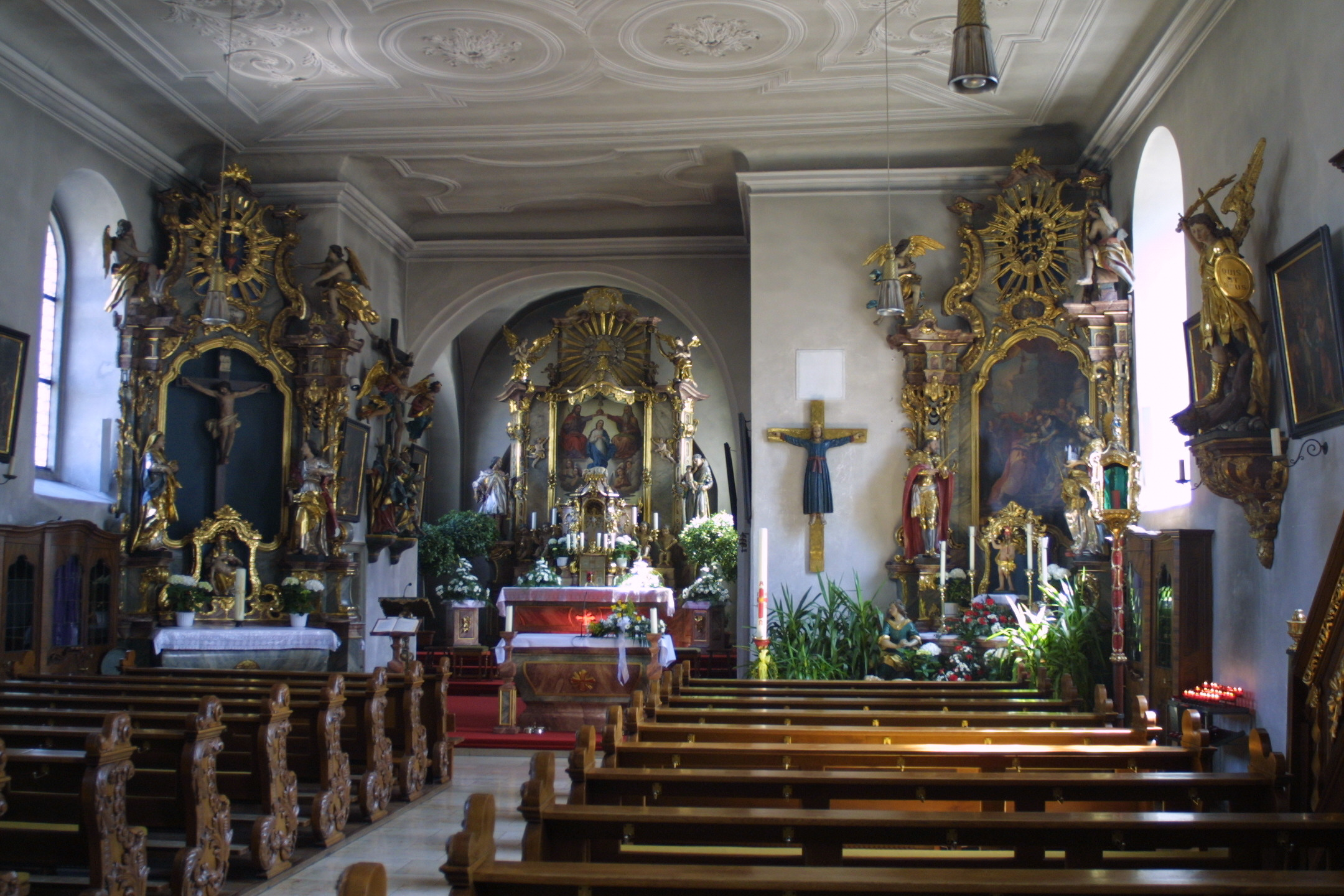
Parish church's interior

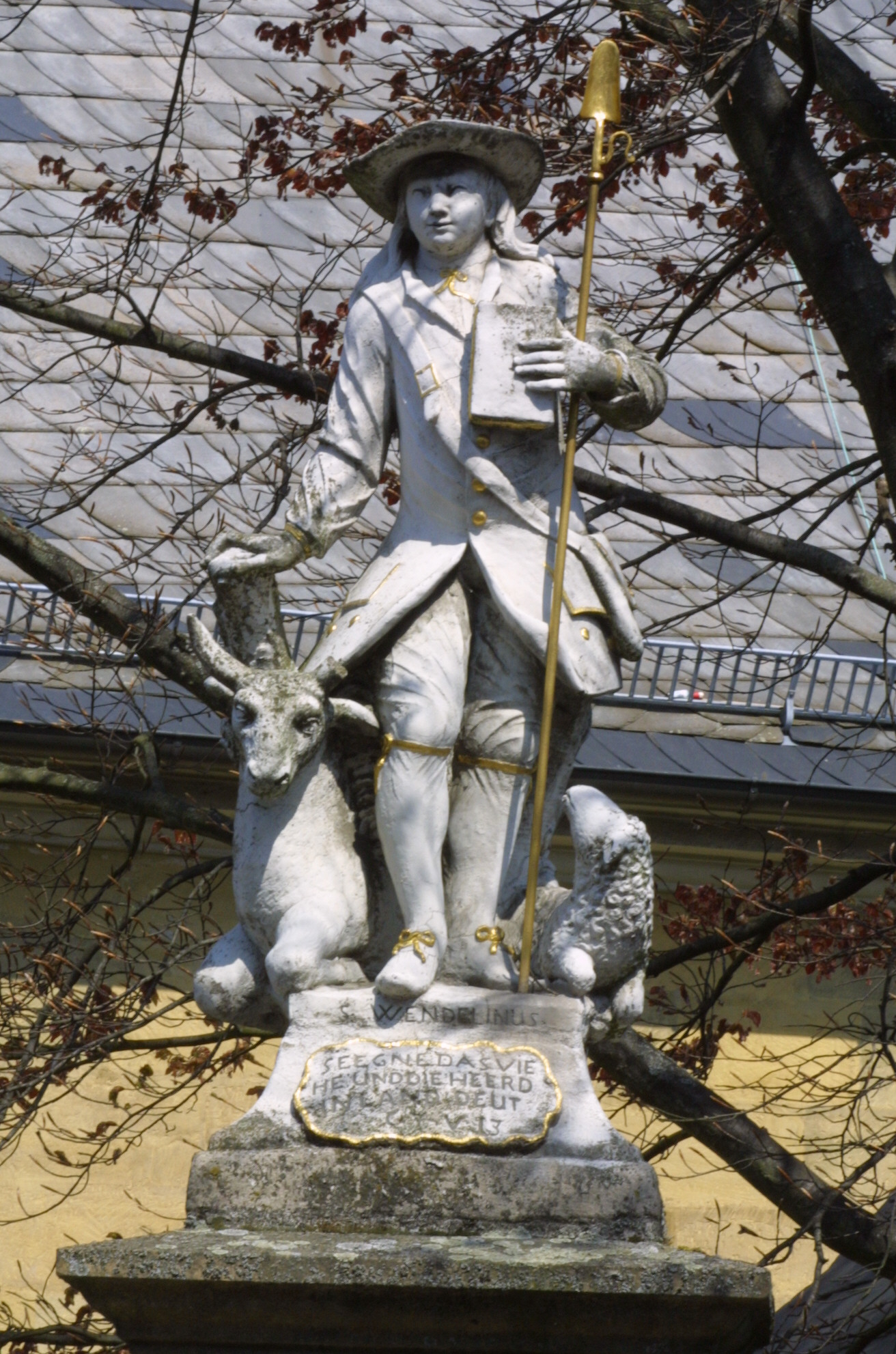
Stone figure of St. Wendelin on the parish church

- Pfarrkirche Mariä Himmelfahrt
- Schloss Seehof was the Bamberg Prince-Bishops’ former summer residence and hunting lodge
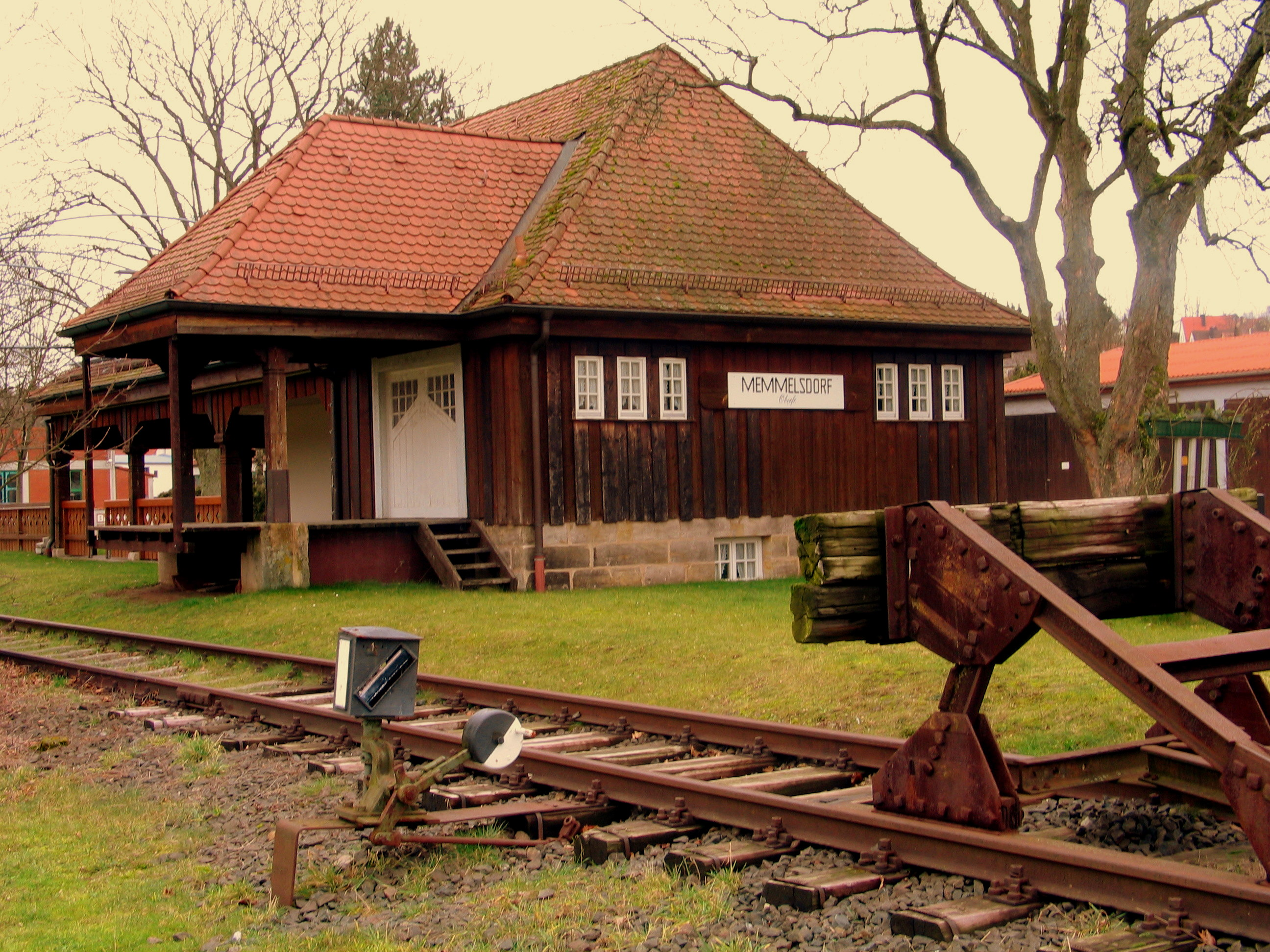
former railway station

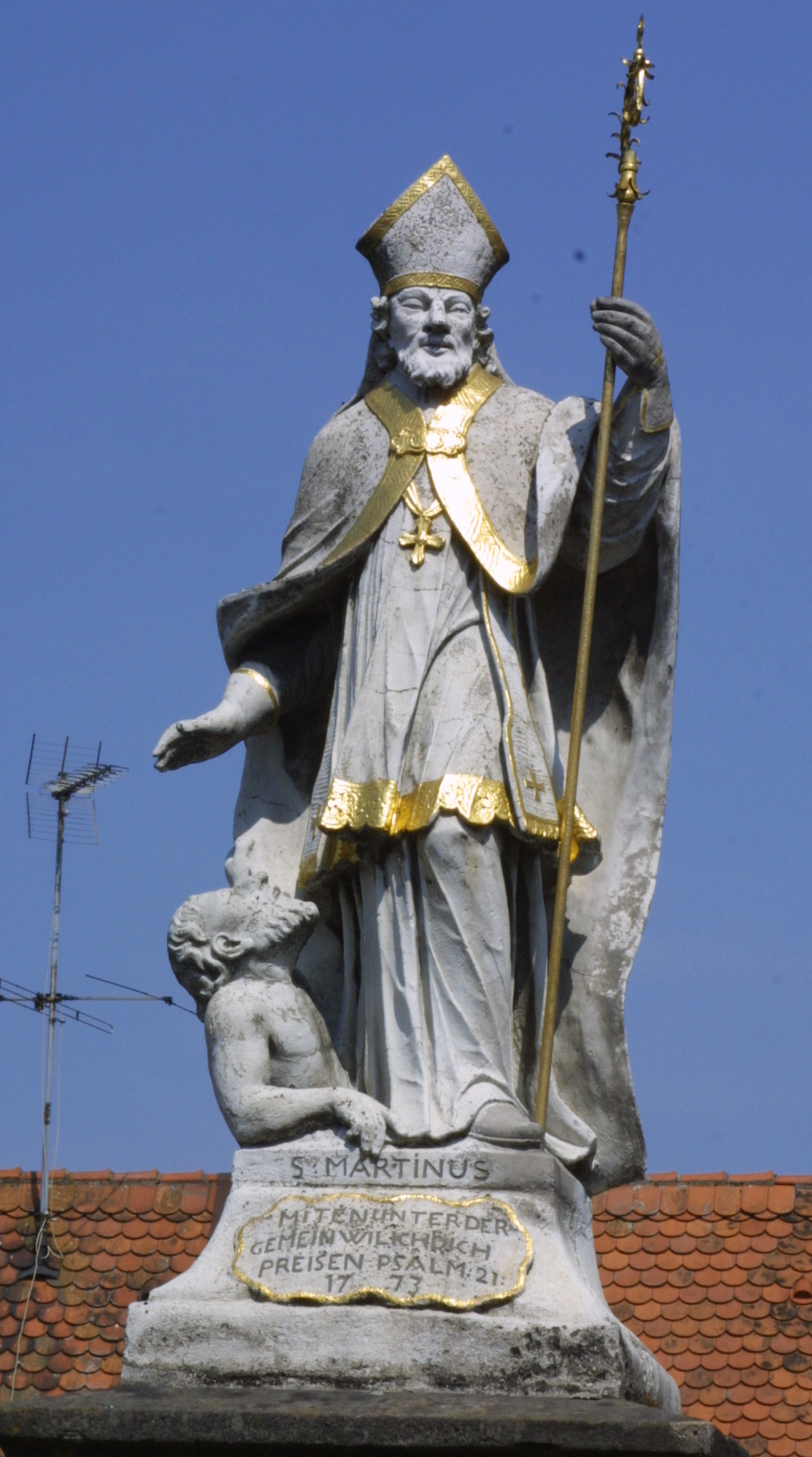
St. Martin

=== Sport ===
The club Sportverein 1923 e. V. offers many departments. From football to bowling, chess and baseball, every sportsman and sportswoman can follow their interests. Over the last few years, various teams from one department or another have made their way into the national leagues, with the first team from the baseball department even reaching the Second Bundesliga.

A yearly sporting event is the Quattroball-Turnier staged by SC Memmelsdorf 1997 e. V. To this meet come up to 400 players in about 100 teams from all over Germany to play the champions in the four different disciplines, volleyball, basketball, handball and soccer fussball. The crush of competitors at this tournament is so great that for some years now, participants have had to have their names drawn by lottery to make it onto the contest list. The winner of Quattroball-Turnier 2008 is named Funky Fresh Crew. In the finals of the tournament they lost one point in soccer against Hamsteraggregat. The Player of the tournament was named Helmut Weiss.

=== Clubs ===
Memmelsdorf is also well known for its successful carnival club Memmelsdorfer Carnevals Club (MCC). The yearly Prunksitzungen (“revues”) in the Seehofhalle Memmelsdorf are known and loved Bavaria-wide. The MCC is the main participant in the Shrovetide (Fasching) parades in Memmelsdorf and in the city of Bamberg.

== Economy and infrastructure ==
=== Economy ===
Most working people are employed at large firms in Bamberg (Bosch, Wieland Electric) or at Michelin in Hallstadt (5 km). Business life in Memmelsdorf is based on many small businesses, which keep the local community supplied with its needs.

Major firms in the community are found mainly in the building industry. The biggest employer, with roughly 150 workers, is Firma Fösel.

==== Breweries ====
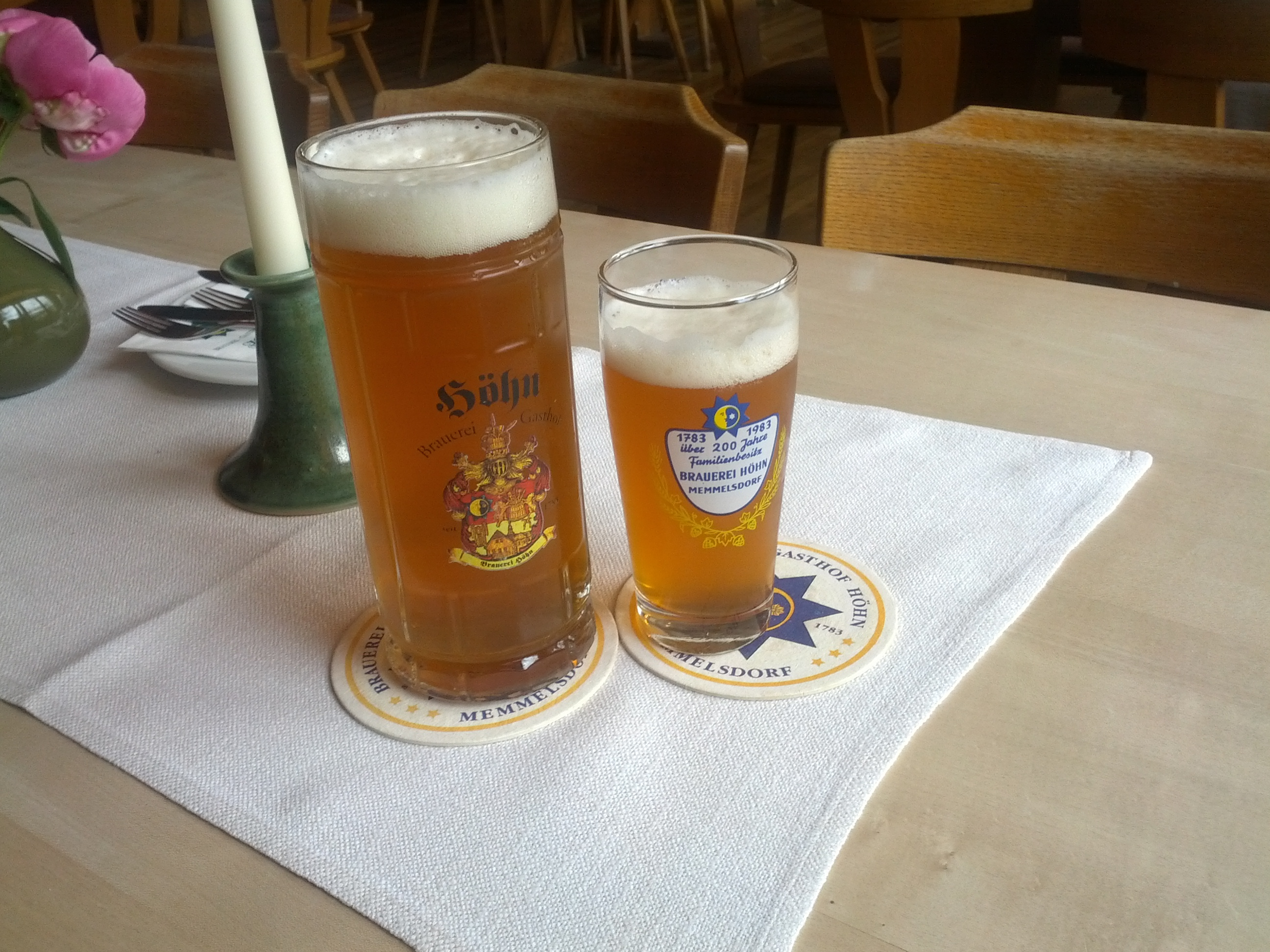
Beers at the Höhn brewery

There are 5 breweries:

- Drei Kronen (Forster) in Memmelsdorf
- Höhn (zum Mondschein) in Memmelsdorf
- Göller in Drosendorf
- Hummel (Drei Kronen) in Merkendorf
- Wagner in Merkendorf

In Memmelsdorf there was once the Brauerei zum (rotten) Ochsen (Nüßlein), whose building now houses a branch of the Sparkasse Bamberg (savings bank). Also, until the 1990s there was the Brauerei Leicht (the so-called Ottn Wirt, recalling the landlord's [“Wirt” in German] endowment of the figure of Saint Otto on the church wall; nowadays only run as an inn).

In Drosendorf until the 1970s there was the Brauerei zur Krone (Nüßlein).

In Kremmeldorf there was the Brauerei Zeiß (formerly Einwich), which is nowadays only run as an inn, as is the former Brauerei Dillig in Laubend.

=== Transport ===
The community of Memmelsdorf lies six kilometres east of the city of Bamberg on Staatsstraße 2190. The community can be reached by the Autobahnen A 70 (Maintalautobahn Schweinfurt-Bayreuth) and A 73 (Frankenschnellweg Nürnberg–Bamberg). East of the A 70/A 73 cloverleaf interchange (Bamberger Kreuz) is the Bamberg-Memmelsdorf exit, right at which lies the centre of Lichteneiche. From there it is two kilometres to Memmelsdorf.

All the community's centres are linked by the Bamberg city bus network.

=== Public institutions ===
In the community is found a home for the elderly offering roughly 50 senior citizens a place. In the 1980s, the Seehofhalle, a multipurpose hall in which sporting and cultural events take place, was built.

The Memmelsdorf municipal library has for many years been borne by the Catholic parish church foundation and the municipality, and been in the care of the Sankt Michaelsbund (a Bavarian Catholic media outlet), Landesverband Bayern e. V. (one of the two organizations between which it is divided). In 2005, about 1,000 users had access to more than 12,000 books, from among which there were roughly 32,000 loans. Another likewise successful library is found in Lichteneiche. Both libraries logged all together about 15,000 visits in 2005.

=== Education ===
- Ferdinand-Dietz-Volksschule Memmelsdorf (primary school and Hauptschule), Pödeldorfer Straße 13
- Grund- und Teilhauptschule Drosendorf-Merkendorf (primary school and part of Hauptschule) Stuhlbrüderweg 31, Drosendorf; Am Sportplatz 10, Merkendorf
- Grundschule Lichteneiche (primary school), Kapellenstr. 38

== Notable people ==
- Abraham Nordheimer
- Samuel Nordheimer

=== Honorary citizens ===
Lothar Güthlein, priest, recognized on 15 November 2005
