= Heintzman & Co. =

Canadian piano company

Heintzman & Co. was a Canadian piano manufacturer.

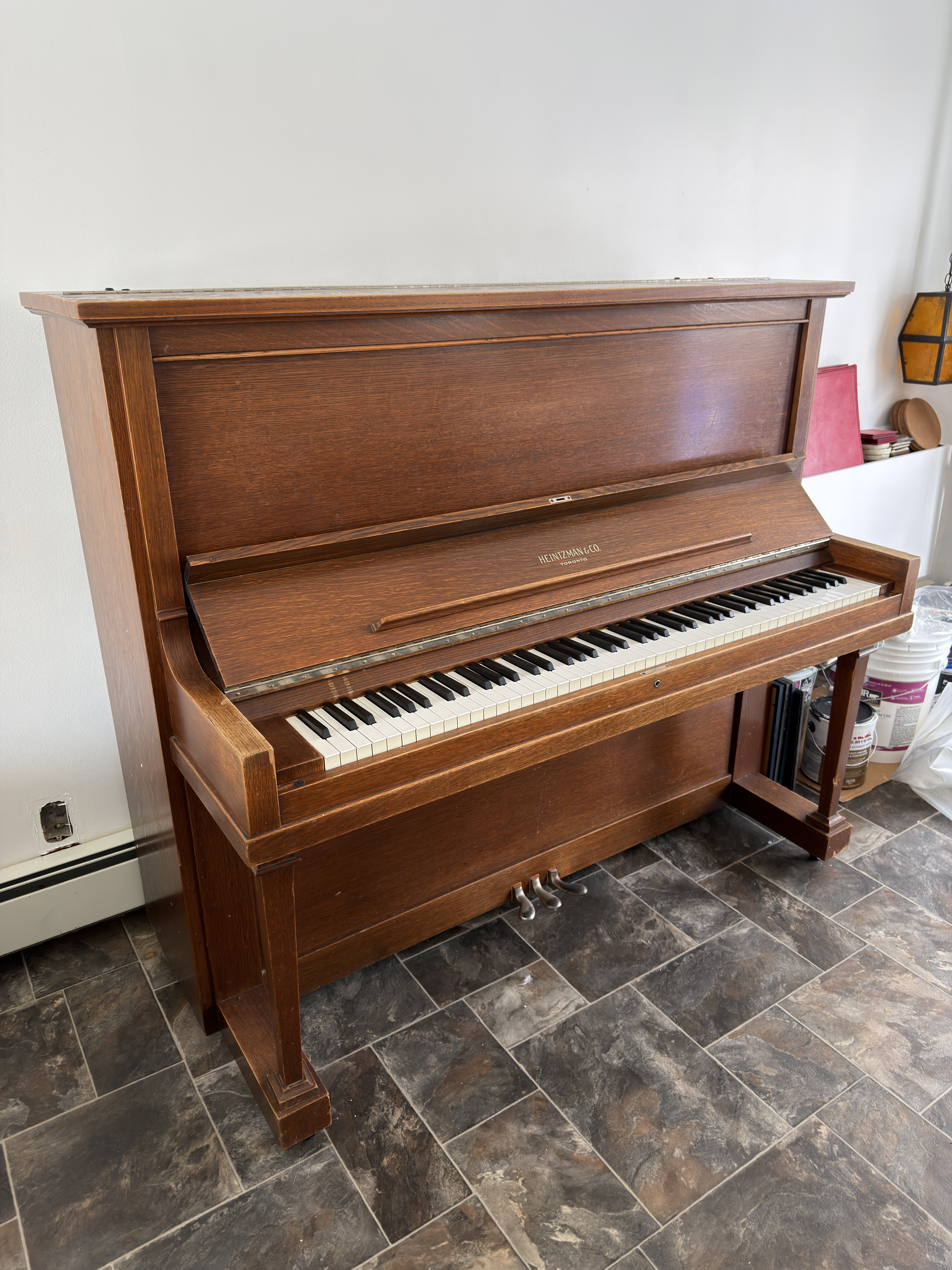
An upright piano manufactured by Heintzman & Co.

== History ==
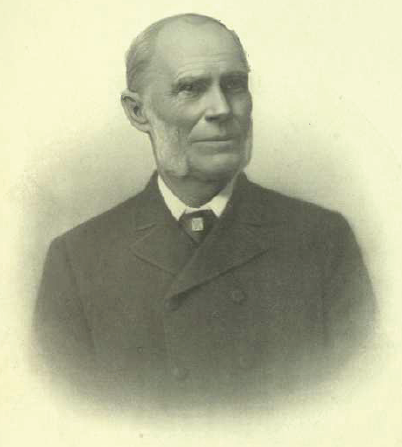
Theodor August Heintzman, founder of Heintzman & Co.

Heintzman & Co. was founded in 1866 in Toronto, Ontario by Theodor August Heintzman, who was born in Berlin, May 19, 1817, and who emigrated to Canada in 1860, following a brief residence in New York City.

Following his arrival in Toronto, Heintzman began to produce pianos from his residence (he is said to have worked initially from his kitchen) and then went on to open his first factory at 23 Duke Street. By May 1868 Heintzman had relocated operations to 105 King St W and was soon turning out more than 60 pianos a year. By 1873 the company had moved to 115-17 King St W where there was space for a factory, offices, and sales rooms. The company was operated by Theodore Heintzman until his death in 1899, when his sons took over operation of the company.

The organisation continued to grow throughout the 1870s, and by 1879 had turned out its thousandth instrument. By 1884 the number of pianos completed reached nearly 2000, and a new factory was built in the West Toronto suburb of Toronto. (Heintzman Street marks the location of the factory today.) All production was moved to the new factory in 1888 and output began to climb steeply.

Theodore Heintzman's nephew, Gerhard Heintzman, was also a piano maker, and when Gerhard died in 1926, Heintzman & Co. continued to operate Gerhard company for several years. In later years they also produced pianos under the Gerhard Heintzman brand. In the 1920s, when many Canadian piano manufacturers were struggling, Heintzman & Co. also took over the Nordheimer Piano Company, and in later years produced pianos under the Nordheimer name. Heintzman & Co. also produced foot-pumped player pianos although a number of electric pianos have been found to use the Welte reproducing system as well as two surviving examples of an ArtEcho reproducing system. Over the years, Heintzman produced pianos were sold under several brands names, and Heintzman also sold pianos produced for them by other piano manufacturers. Heintzman's top pianos were produced under the "Heintzman & Company" brand, with the "Gerhard Heintzman" brand being next, then the "Nordheimer" brand (acquired from Albert Nordheimer, a nephew of Samuel Nordheimer in 1927). Brands that were produced for them, and sold with a "From Heintzman & Company" decal were Gerhard, Weber, Stevenson. Unlike some piano manufacturers of the time, Heintzman always aimed to produce high-quality, rather than affordable instruments, and it was on the basis of this reputation that the firm carried its success into the twentieth century. Heintzman suffered considerably during the Great Depression of the 1930s, but continued to manufacture pianos in the decades that followed, reaching production of 5000 instruments in 1967.

Heintzman had opened an additional factory in Hanover, Ontario in 1962, and following a merger in 1978 with the Sherlock-Manning Piano Co, relocated their head offices there as Heintzman Ltd. The new company continued to produce pianos under both names, with the Heintzman grand piano the top line.

In January 1981, Heintzman Ltd was sold by the family to Sklar-Peppler Inc. of Hanover, Ontario, and was operated by Sklar-Peppler as a subsidiary under the Heintzman Ltd. name. It redesigned, rescaled and re-engineered both upright and grand pianos, and by 1985, 750 uprights and 40-50 grands were produced annually. People say that pianos of this era are popularly considered to be of substantially lower quality than earlier instruments, though still good compared to pianos manufactured around the world today, even in Germany. They made good furniture pieces and were hand made out of Canadian wood by the same people in Heintzman.

In 1986 The Music Stand, an Oakville-based franchise music retail chain, purchased the Heintzman Ltd. patents and trademarks from Sklar-Peppler, as well as the remaining inventory, which it marketed. In 1990, a Federal Court judge ruled that The Music Stand could not place the Heintzman nameplate on pianos built in South Korea and the US, which it imported for sale in Canada.

== Today ==
The current "Heintzman Piano Company" was established in August 1989 as a joint venture between the Beijing HsingHai Piano Group and Canadian shareholders. This company bought the manufacturing equipment and scale designs from the Canadian factory, which are still used in current-production pianos. James Moffat, the Canadian plant manager, was retained as a consultant and continues to visit the Chinese factory several times each year. In 1995, when the Chinese government began allowing foreign control of manufacturing companies, the Canadian shareholders bought out controlling shares in the company. Heintzman grands use soundboards from Canadian manufacturer Andre Bolduc.

== Characteristics ==
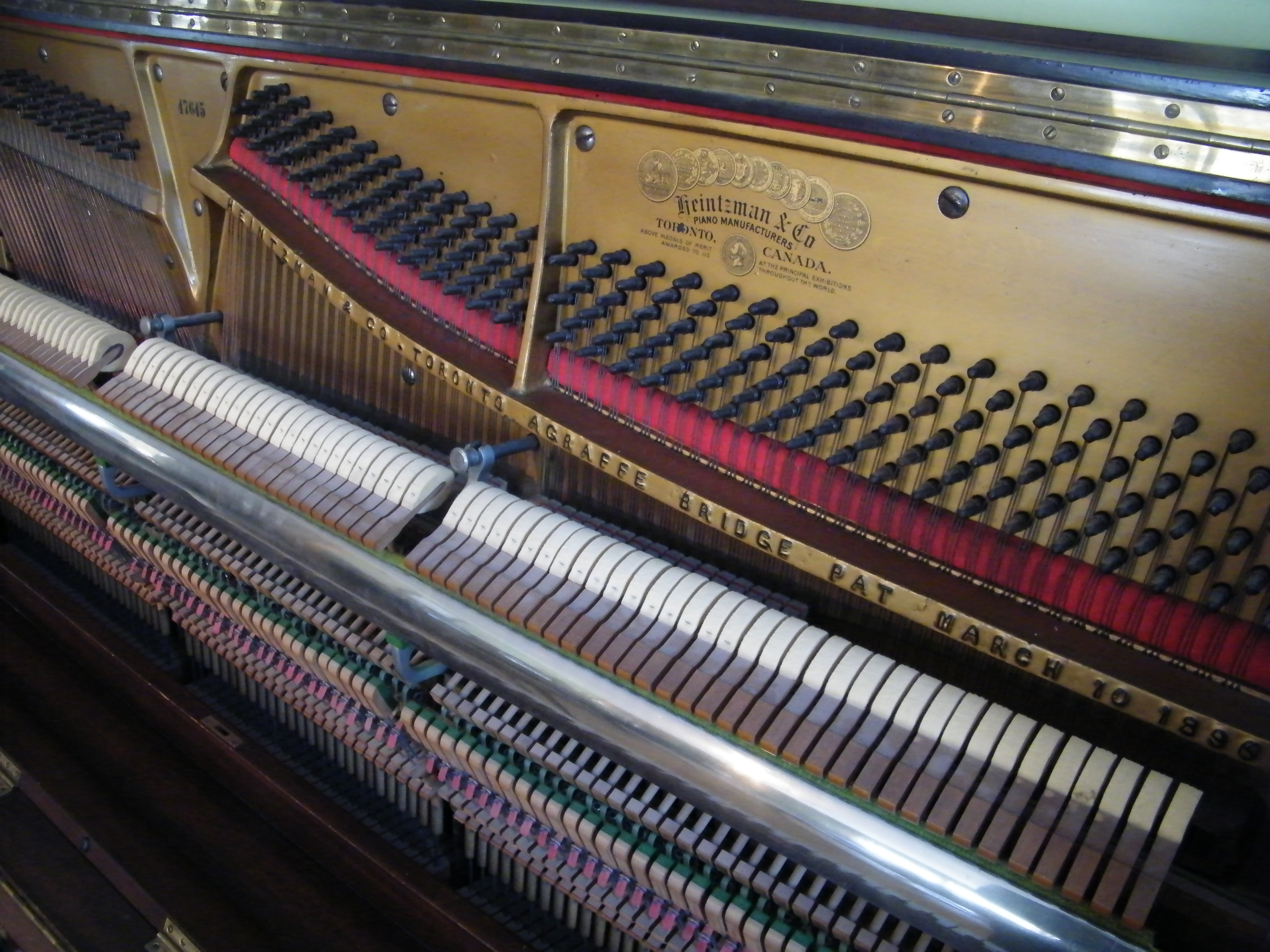
1914 Heintzman upright piano

According to one piano technician, Heintzman & Co. "produced uncompromised quality grand and upright pianos through the early decades of the twentieth century. Unfortunately, the market for large uprights declined through the 1930s. Heintzman followed the trend toward smaller cheaper uprights and although they produced better than average uprights, they couldn't match the sound and quality of the earlier full sized upright pianos that they had once produced."

== See also ==
- Heintzman House
