= Imperial Order Daughters of the Empire =

Women's charitable organization

- Abbreviation: IODE
- Formation: 15 January 1900; 126 years ago (Note: The first meeting held by the organization took place in Fredericton on 15 January 1900.)
- Founder: Margaret Polson Murray
- Founded at: Fredericton, New Brunswick
- Type: Nonprofit
- Legal status: Charity
- Headquarters: Toronto, Ontario
- Region served: Canada
- President (National Chapter): Jane Cushing
- Website: iode.ca
- Formerly called: Federation of the Daughters of the Empire

The Imperial Order Daughters of the Empire (IODE) is a women's charitable organization based in Canada. It provides scholarships, bursaries, book prizes, and awards, and pursues other philanthropic and educational projects in various communities across Canada. The IODE's motto was "One Flag, One Throne, One Empire" and the IODE's magazine is called Echoes.

== History ==
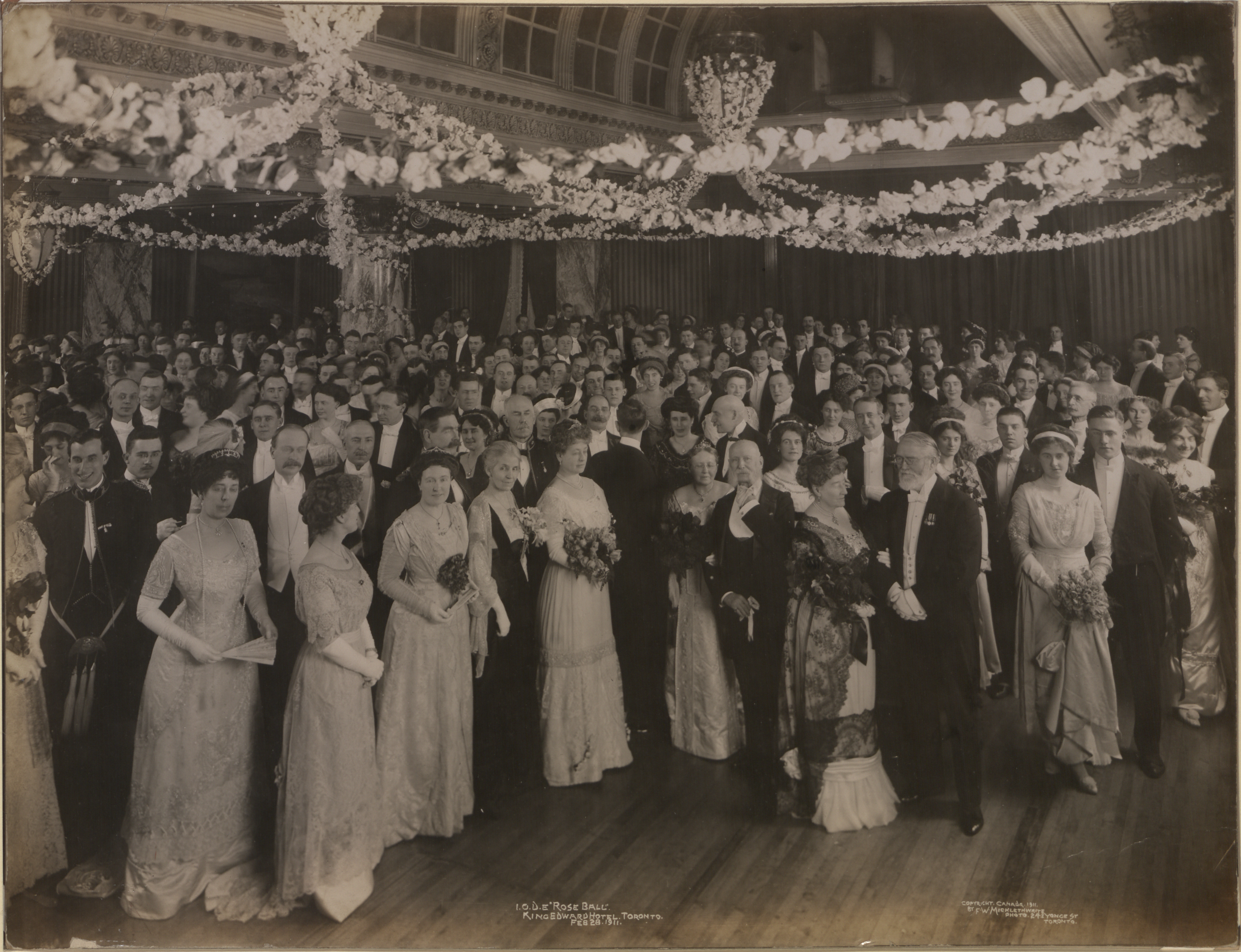
IODE Rose Ball at the King Edward Hotel, Toronto, on 28 February 1911, photographed by F. W. Micklethwaite.

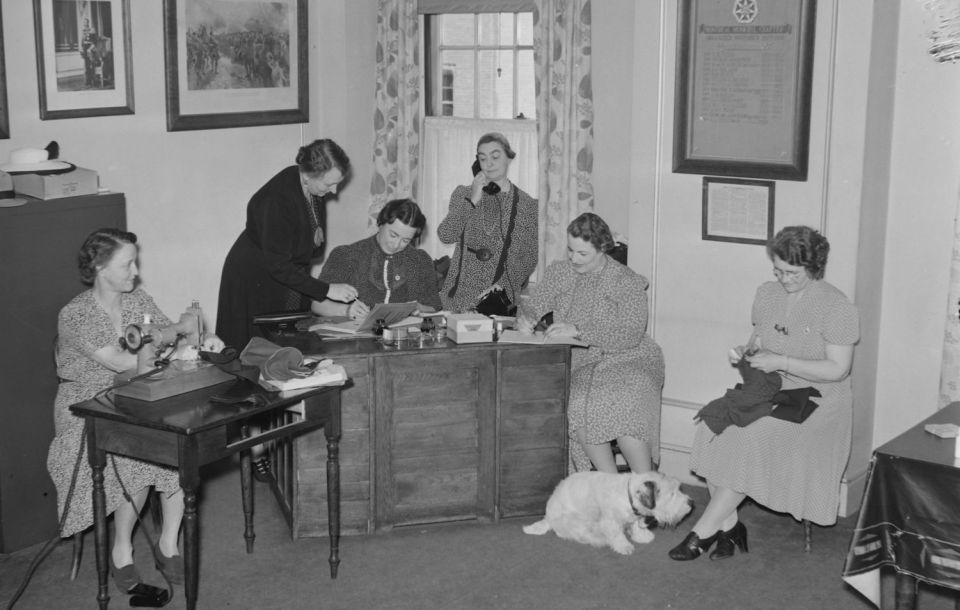
IODE volunteers during the Second World War.

In 1899, Margaret Polson Murray was in England and was swept up in the wave of patriotic support for the British Empire that followed the outbreak of the Second Boer War. On her return to Canada she immediately started to organise a woman's support group which would "place themselves in the front rank of colonial patriotism" and give practical charitable aid to soldiers, and if they were killed, support for their dependents, and care for their graves. On 13 January 1900, she sent telegrams to the mayors of major Canadian cities asking for their support for her fledgling organization which she called "Daughters of the Empire" that would also be "inviting the women of Australia and New Zealand to join with them in sending to the Queen an expression of our devotion to the Empire, and an Emergency War Fund, to be expended as Her Majesty shall deem fit." On 15 January 1900, the founding meeting of the first chapter was held in Fredericton. On the same day, Polson Murray publicized her initiative by issuing a press release and giving interviews in Montreal newspapers.

On 13 February 1900, 25 women attended a meeting in Montreal and agreed to form a national organization called the "Federation of the Daughters of the Empire." Polson Murray was elected honorary secretary, and for the rest of the year, she energetically took steps to expand the Federation. Soon there were branches all over Canada, and some affiliated ones in the United States. One of Murray's initiatives was to contact the Department of Indian Affairs to encourage women of the First Nations to join the Federation.

The Federation organized a huge welcome dinner for returning soldiers, and contacted a sister organization Guild of Loyal Women in South Africa and the British War Office to arrange the care of war graves of fallen Canadian and Boer soldiers, particularly those in isolated places.

In England in 1901, the Victoria League was established with similar aims to those of the Daughters of the Empire and the Guild of Loyal Women. The senior members of the Victoria League were members of the British Establishment and were not willing to become members of an organization based in the colonies. After Polson Murray returned to Canada after a successful recruitment drive in England, Scotland, and Ireland, the League wrote to Polson Murray stating that they would not support the branches of the Daughters of the Empire in the United Kingdom because it would cause competition and confusion resulting in the weakening of the league and the support that both organizations could give their mutual causes. This was a genuine concern that was recognized by the South African Guild of Loyal Women who realized that conflict was not in their immediate interests. With their pressing needs, the South Africans voluntarily agreed to their members in Britain joining the league. It also masked an underlying snobbery of the London social elite who could not countenance being members of any organization that they did not control.

On her return from Britain in October 1901, Polson Murray was fatigued and ill, so she asked the ladies of Ontario – the region with the most support for the Daughters of the Empire – to assume leadership. The headquarters moved from Montreal to Toronto and the organization was renamed "Imperial Order Daughters of the Empire" (IODE), with the motto became "One flag, one throne, one empire." Edith Nordheimer was elected the first national president. The Boer War had not ended and the aims and of the renamed organization did not change. The committee on war graves continued its partnership with the Guild of Loyal Women of South Africa.

Over the next decade the relationship between the Victoria League and the IODE improved but was never cordial. In 1911, Nordheimer resigned and in 1912, Polson Murray was invited to resume her position as honorary secretary and later was given honorary life membership. From 1912 till 1919, Lady Mary Reford Gooderham served as National President. In 1917, the IODE was incorporated as a Canadian women's organization by a special act of the Parliament of Canada.

During the Second World War, the IODE had 50,000 members and participated in war effort relief drives, such as sock drives and scrap drives.

== Imperialism and race ==
During the early years of its existence, the IODE concentrated its efforts on the advancement of British imperialism—namely, promoting Britain and British institutions through education. According to the IODE Constitution, the organization's primary objectives were to "promote in the Motherland and in the Colonies the study of the History of the Empire and of current Imperial questions" and to "stimulate, and give expression to the sentiment of patriotism which binds the women and children of the Empire around the Throne."

In addition to its explicitly imperialist mandate, the IODE aimed to foster an exclusionary sense of Canadian national identity grounded in racist assumptions current at the beginning of the twentieth century. As Katie Pickles notes,

"It was during the early years of the twentieth century that the IODE formed and solidified its own racial ideology. Its beliefs were steeped in powerful ideas of the time, such as the superiority of an Anglo-Celtic race that was interpreted as being biological, and which was demonstrable from imperial conquests such as the South Africa War."

The discriminatory practices of the IODE were not, however, confined to its propagation of the belief in a distinct, superior "British race." The IODE also aimed to actively discourage the immigration of visible minorities and people of colour to Canada. The most infamous example of such hostility to non-white immigrants occurred in 1911, when the Edmonton chapter of the IODE petitioned the minister of the interior, Frank Oliver, to ban Black immigrants to Western Canada. "We view with alarm the continuous and rapid influx of Negro settlers," they wrote. "[This] immigration will have the immediate effect of… discouraging white settlement in the vicinity of the Negro farms and will depreciate the value of all holdings within such areas."

== Archives ==
There is an Imperial Order Daughters of the Empire fonds at Library and Archives Canada. The archive comprises documents (minutes, records, etc.) and ephemera of the organization spanning the period from 1900 to 1986. It covers the date range 1900 to 2000.

== Arms ==
Coat of arms of Imperial Order Daughters of the Empire
Crest A Doric capital silver supporting a basin issuant therefrom red roses leaved all proper Escutcheon Per pale Gules and Azure, a mullet of seven points Argent pommé and edged Or charged with a maple leaf Gules and interlaced by a belt Argent engrailed to the exterior invected to the interior edged and buckled Or Supporters Two lionesses guardant Or each gorged of a ribbon per fess Gules and Azure and standing on stone steps proper Motto PRO REGINA ET PATRIA (Latin for 'For Queen and Country')

== See also ==
- List of Canadian organizations with royal patronage
- Daughters of the British Empire is the US counterpart.
